= Antoniotto Usodimare =

Genoese trader and explorer

Antoniotto Usodimare or Usus di Mare (1416–1462) was a Genoese trader and explorer in the service of the Portuguese Prince Henry the Navigator. Jointly with Alvise Cadamosto, Usodimare discovered a great stretch of the West African coast in two known voyages in 1455 and 1456. They notably discovered the Cape Verde islands, and the Guinea coast from the Gambia River to the Geba River (in Guinea-Bissau).

== Background ==
Antoniotto Usodimare was a prominent merchant and citizen of the Republic of Genoa, a director of the Genoese mint and a shareholder in the Banco di S. Giorgio. However, his fortunes soon took a turn for the worse. Around 1450, Usodimare fled Genoa to escape his creditors, making his way first to Seville, and then Lisbon. He eventually entered into the service of Portuguese Prince Henry the Navigator, hoping that by engaging in the profitable Portuguese trade on the West African coast, he might quickly recover his fortunes and pay back his debts.

In some sources, Antoniotto Usodimare is confused with António de Noli, another Genoese explorer in the service of Prince Henry, who, according to the memoirs of Portuguese captain Diogo Gomes, also went to the Gambia River and rediscovered the Cape Verde islands in 1462. Although the coincidences are interesting, there is no evidence they are the same man.

== Expeditions to Africa ==
Antoniotto Usodimare sailed out in early 1455 in a Portuguese caravel, probably supplied by Prince Henry the Navigator, accompanied by another caravel with an unnamed Portuguese squire of the prince. Along the way, in June 1455, around Cape Vert peninsula, he stumbled across Alvise Cadamosto, a Venetian captain also in Henry's service. They joined forces and proceeded to jointly find the mouth of the Gambia River in June 1455. However, meeting strong hostility from the natives upriver, the ships returned to Portugal. It is here that Antoniotto Usodimare wrote his famous letter (dated December 12, 1455) to his creditors back in Genoa, giving a (rather exaggerated) account of his expedition the Gambia, and promising that on his next expedition there, he would make enough money to finally pay them back.

Antoniotto Usoadimare, along with Alvise Cadamosto and a third unnamed Portuguese captain, set out again in May, 1456. Along the way, they deviated away from the Senegambian coast to avoid a storm, and ended up discovering the Cape Verde islands (some 560 km or 300 nmi off the coast). Finding the uninhabited islands uninteresting, they returned to the coast, and sailed into the Gambia River once again. This time, they found no hostile opposition to their entry. They sailed probably up to 100 km upstream, and engaged in some petty trade with the Mandinka natives, but were disappointed to find little evidence of the abundance of gold or melegueta pepper they had expected to find upriver. Resolved to explore further, Antoniotto and Cadamosto sailed south along the previously unknown coast of Guinea, discovering the mouth of the Casamance River, Cape Roxo, the Cacheu River, reaching as far as the estuary of the Geba River and the Bijagos Islands (modern Guinea-Bissau). As the interpreters carried on board the Portuguese ships (probably Wolof and Mandinka) could not understand the language of the local peoples this far south, the captains were unable to make any deep inquiries of them. They set sail back to Portugal thereafter.

== Later career ==
Apparently the second expedition turned out to be profitable enough for Antoniotto Usodimare to pay off his creditors, as he returned to Genoa shortly after. In 1458, Usodimare was sent as an agent of the commercial house of Marchionni to the Genoese colony of Caffa on the Black Sea. He died in 1462.

The Italian royal navy named a 1929 Navigatori class destroyer after him. The Antoniotto Usodimare sunk in June 1942.

== Usodimare's letter ==
Upon his return from his first expedition, Antoniotto Usodimare wrote a famous letter, dated December 12, 1455, to his creditors back in Genoa, informing them of his recent journey - albeit laced with great exaggerations and half-truths. He does not mention Cadamosto in his letter, and instead gives the impression he sailed alone deep into the Gambia River. He says he reached within a few days of the seat of the Mali Empire and within traveling distance to the lands of Prester John (Ethiopian Empire). Usodimare claims to have come across a man of Genoese descent along the shores of the Gambia - ostensibly a descendant of the survivors of the 1291 expedition of explorers Vandino and Ugolino Vivaldi.

Antoniotto Usodimare told his creditors he had been sent to Gambia as an ambassador of King Afonso V of Portugal, to negotiate a peace treaty with the "King of Gambia", and that he was scheduled to return the next year to escort his counterpart, the Gambian ambassador, back home. More to the point his creditors were interested in, Usodimare anticipated he would likely make enough money on this second trip to fully pay them off. The letter expresses the first known mention that melegueta pepper might be found in the Guinea region and a rare mention of maritime insurance being taken by Henrican captains.

Usodimare's letter, written in garbled Latin, was discovered around 1800 in a manuscript by Giacomo (Jacob) Gråberg, a Swedish merchant resident in Genoa, in the archives of the city, as part of one of three documents assembled by a 15th-century Genoese cartographer (possibly Barthelemi Pareto) as elements to guide the construction of a new portolan map. The letter was first published in 1802 in Gråberg's journal, and has been reproduced many times since.

== Sources ==
- Antoniotto Uso di Mare Itinerarium Antonii ususmaris civis januensis, 1455 (first published in G. Gråberg (1802) Annali di geografia e di statistica, Genoa, vol. II, p. 286-8, p. 290-91)
- Alvise Cadamosto Navigazione di Luigi di Cadamosto, first published 1507 in Francanzano Montalbado, editor, Paesi novamente retrovati. (Eng. trans. "Original Journals of the Voyages of Cada Mosto and Piedro de Cintra to the Coast of Africa, the former in the years 1455 and 1456, and the latter soon afterwards", reprinted in R. Kerr, 1811, A General History of Voyages and Travels to the end of the 18th century, vol. 2, Edinburgh: Blackwood. Ch.4)
- J. Codine, "Review of Major's Life of Pince Henry", 1873, Bulletin de la Société de géographie, p. 397-425. (p.412)
- Diffie, Bailey W., and George D. Winius (1977) Foundations of the Portuguese empire, 1415-1580. Minneapolis, MN: University of Minnesota Press
- Major, R.H. (1868) The Life of Prince Henry, surnamed the Navigator. London: Asher & Co. 1868 ed.
- Russell, Peter E. (2000) Prince Henry 'the Navigator': a life. New Haven, Conn: Yale University Press.
- M. Walckenaer (1810) "Correspondence de MM.Walckenaer et Graberg, sure les manuscrits d'Usodimare, conservés a Genes", 1810, Annales des voyages de la géographie et de l'histoire, Volume 8,p.190
