= Vandino and Ugolino Vivaldi =

Genoese explorers and merchants (fl. 1291)

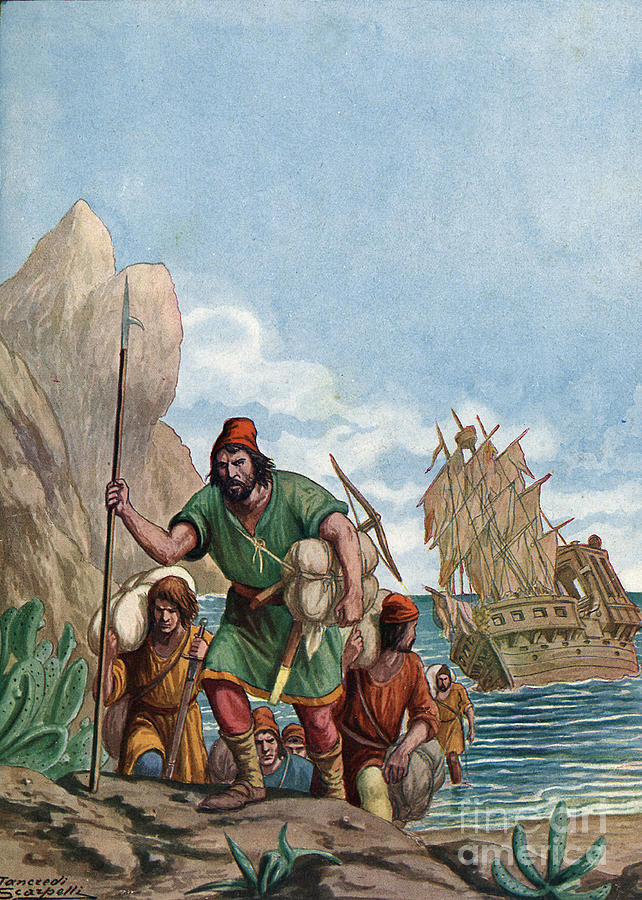
- The Sinking Of One Of The Ships Of The Brothers Ugolino And Vadino Vivaldi, by Tancredi Scarpelli, 1936
- Born: Genoa
- Disappeared: 1291
- Occupations: Explorers and merchants
- Known for: Attempted voyage from Europe to India via Africa
- Parent(s): Amighetto Vivaldi and Giovannina Vivaldi (née Zaccaria)

Vandino (sometimes Vadino or Guido) and Ugolino Vivaldi (sometimes Ugolino de Vivaldo) (fl. 1291) were two brothers and Genoese explorers and merchants who are best known for their attempted voyage from Europe to India via Africa. They set sail west from the Mediterranean into the Atlantic and were never heard from again.

== History ==
Vandino and Ugolino Vivaldi were involved in the first recorded expedition in search of a maritime route from Europe to India (the Cape Route). The brothers were in command of this expedition of two galleys, which Ugolino had organized in conjunction with Tedisio Doria. The expedition left Genoa in May 1291 with the purpose of going to India "by the Ocean Sea" and bringing back useful things for trade. Planned primarily for commerce, the enterprise also aimed at proselytism, and two Franciscan friars accompanied Ugolino. The galleys were also well-armed. They sailed down the Morocco coast to a place called Gozora (present-day Cape Nun), at latitude 28º 47' N, after which nothing more was heard of them. The expedition of the Vivaldi brothers was one of the first recorded voyages that sailed out from the Mediterranean beyond the Strait of Gibraltar and into the Atlantic since the Fall of the Western Roman Empire in the 5th century AD.

It is believed that when Lancelotto Malocello set sail from Genoa in 1312, he did so in order to search for Vandino and Ugolino Vivaldi. Malocello ended up remaining on the island that is named for him, Lanzarote, one of the Canary Islands, for more than two decades.

Early in the 14th century, Sorleone de Vivaldo, son of Ugolino, undertook a series of distant wanderings in search of his father and uncle, and even reached, it is said, Mogadishu on the Somali coast, but was prevented by the Sultan of Mogadishu from going to Aksum because the road to the collapsed ancient kingdom was no longer secure. In 1455 another Genoese seaman, Antoniotto Uso di Mare, sailing with Cadamosto in the service of Prince Henry the Navigator of Portugal, claimed to have met the last descendant of the survivors of the Vivaldo expedition near the mouth of the Gambia. The two galleys, he was told, had sailed to the Sea of Guinea, where one became stranded and the other continued on to a place on the coast of Aethiopia (here meaning Black Africa) — Mena or Amenuan, near the Gihon (here probably meaning the Senegal River) where the sailors were seized by locals and held in close captivity.

== Sources ==
The principal documentary source is the Genoese annals of Jacopo Doria, presented to the city of Genoa in 1294. Under the entry for the year 1291, Doria writes the following:

"Tedisio d'Oria, Ugolino Vivaldi and a brother of the latter, together with a few other citizens of Genoa, initiated an expedition which no one up to that time had ever attempted. They fitted out two galleys in splendid fashion. Having stocked them with provision, water and other necessities, they sent them on their way, in the month of May, toward the Strait of Ceuta in order that the galleys might sail through the ocean sea to India and return with useful merchandise. The two above-mentioned brothers went on the vessels in person, and also two Franciscan friars; all of which truly astonished those who witnessed them as well as those who heard of them. After the travelers passed a place called Gozora there was no further news of them. May God watch over them and bring them back safely"

Additional documents identify the other brother as "Vadino", that Tedesio Doria (Jacopo's nephew) did not embark, that the supplies were for "ten years", that the names of the vessels were Sanctus Antonius and Alegranzia, and that the ship made a brief stop at Mallorca before proceeding.

In Galvano Fiamma's book, Cronica universalis, Galvano claims the Vivaldi expedition reached Ethiopia, where the survivors gave up returning to their home country.

== Geography ==
Jean Gimpel suggests that the two Franciscan friars who accompanied the Vivaldi brothers may have read the Opus Majus written by fellow Franciscan Roger Bacon, in which Bacon suggested that the distance separating Spain and India was not great, a theory that was later repeated by Pierre d'Ailly and tested by Christopher Columbus.

It is uncertain how far the Vivaldi brothers reached. They may have seen or landed on the Canary Islands. "Gozora" is a name found in some medieval charts for Cape Nun, which lies before the Canary Islands (e.g. Caput Finis Gozole in the maps of Giovanni da Carignano, early 1300s, and the Pizzigani brothers, 1367). The name of the ship Alegranzia may be the source for the Canary Island of Alegranza, and has led to the supposition that the brothers landed there (or at least that one of the ships capsized there).

An allusion to the Vivaldi galleys is given in the Libro del Conoscimiento, a semi-fantastical travelogue written by an anonymous Spanish friar c. 1350–1385. There are two passages relating to the Vivaldi brothers. In the first, the narrator, traveling in what seems like the Guinea region (sub-Saharan Africa) reaches the city of Graçiona, capital of the black African empire of Abdeselib, which is allied to Prester John. "They told me in this city of Graciona that the Genoese who escaped the galley that was wrecked at Amenuan were brought (betrayed?) here, but it was never known what became of the other galley which escaped." When the traveling friar moved on to the neighboring city of Magdasor, he came across a Genoese man named Sor Leone who was in this city "searching for his father who had left in two galleys, as I have already explained, and they gave him every honor, but when this Sor Leone wanted to traverse to the empire of Graciona to search for his father, the emperor of Magdasor did not allow it, because way was doubtful and the path was dangerous" As it happens, Sorleone is the real name of Ugolino's actual son.

The locations of these kingdoms have been the subject of much speculation. The references to Prester John and Magdasor (which sounds much like Mogadishu) have led some to assume that the other galley circumnavigated Africa but was intercepted near the Horn of Africa. However, the narrator's geographical references (e.g. to the Senegal-Niger River, the gold trade, the Mali Empire, even the Gulf of Guinea) suggest that Abdelsalib and Magdasor were in non-Muslim sub-Saharan West Africa. The localization of "Amenuan", the place where the first galley capsized, is suggestive of the Senegambia region. If there is a grain of truth in any of this, it would not stretch credulity to imagine that the Vivaldis got as far as Senegal, and that their adventures ended there.

A century later, in late 1455, Antoniotto Usodimare, a Genoese navigator in the service of Prince Henry the Navigator, claimed rather improbably in a letter that while traveling up the Gambia River in West Africa, he came across a man who spoke the Genoese dialect and claimed to be the last descendant of the survivors of the Vivaldi expedition. (Usodimare's travelling companion, Alvise Cadamosto, mentions no such meeting in his memoirs.) Usodimare gives more details of the Vivaldi expedition in another document in the Genoese archives:

In the year of 1285 (sic), two galleys sailed out of the city of Genoa commanded by the brothers Ugolino and Guido Vivaldi (Hugolinum et Guidum de Vivaldis fratres) with the purpose of going, by the east (per Levantum), to the parts of India. These galleys sailed much; but when they entered the sea of Guinea (mari de Ghinoia), one of the galleys tore its hull, and could not continue sailing further; the other, however, continued through this sea until it reached a city of Ethiopia named Menam; they were captured and detained by the inhabitants of this city, who are Christians of Ethiopia, subjects of Prester John. The city is by the sea-coast, near the river Gion. They were so tightly detained that none of them managed to return home. This is what is related by the Genoese noble Antoniotto Usodimare

Gion is the name of the biblical Gihon river, which stems from the Garden of Eden and flows through Ethiopia. In this instance, it may be a reference to the Senegal River. Usodimare's narration seems to be a mere repetition of the tale told in the Libro del Conoscimiento.

The historian José de Viera y Clavijo writes that Father Agustín Justiniani, in the Anales de Génova, includes the information that two Franciscans also joined the Vivaldi expedition. Viera y Clavijo also mentions the fact that Petrarch states that it was a local tradition that the Vivaldis did indeed reach the Canary Islands. Neither Justiniani nor Petrarch knew of the expedition's fate. Papiro Masson in his Anales writes that the brothers were the first modern discoverers of the Canary Islands.

The Vivaldi brothers subsequently became the subjects of legends that featured them circumnavigating Africa before being captured by the mythical Christian king Prester John. The Vivaldis' voyage may have inspired Dante's Canto 26 of the Inferno about Ulysses’ last voyage, which ends in failure in the Southern Hemisphere. According to Henry F. Cary, Ulysses' fate was inspired "...partly from the fate which there was reason to suppose had befallen some adventurous explorers of the Atlantic ocean."

== See also ==
- List of people who disappeared mysteriously at sea
