= Lancelotto Malocello =

13th and 14th century Genoese navigator

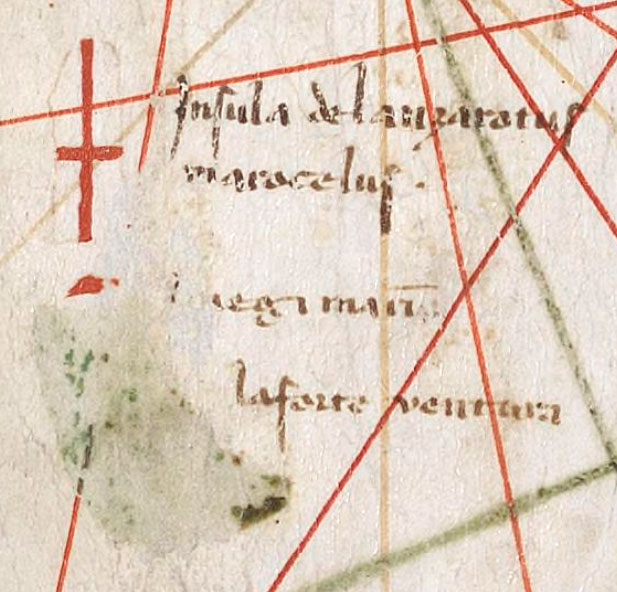
Detail of the island of Lanzarotus in the 1339 map by Angelino Dulcert.

Lancelotto Malocello (Italian pronunciation: [lantʃeˈlɔtto maloˈtʃɛllo]) (Latin: Lanzarotus Marocelus; French: Lancelot Maloisel; fl. 1312) was an Italian navigator, citizen of the Republic of Genoa, who gave his name to the island of Lanzarote, one of the Canary Islands. Lancelotto is the Italian form of the name Lancelot.

== History ==
Lancelotto Malocello was born in Varazze (Republic of Genoa), now Province of Savona, in 1270. The navigator is credited with the discovery of the Canary Islands in 1312; the island first appeared on a European map of Angelino Dulcert (the Dulcert Atlas) in 1339 under the name "Ínsula de Lançarote Mallucellus" (island of Lancelotto Malocello), later shortened to "Lanzarote". The island's native name was Tyterogaka.

Malocello may have voyaged in search of the brothers Vandino and Ugolino Vivaldi, who had sailed south of Cape Nun in 1291 on their way to India, and whose fate was unknown. Malocello arrived on the island in 1312, and remained there for almost two decades until he was expelled by a Guanche revolt. Information about this revolt is scanty, but his stay on the island is supported by various sources, including the chronicles of the Norman conquest of the island under Jean de Béthencourt almost a century later, which state that the fortress constructed by Malocello could still be found on the island. Malocello's fortress was situated above Teguise.

== Legacy ==
To celebrate the seventh centenary of the discovery of Lanzarote, in the Canary Islands by the Italian navigator Lanzarotto Malocello, which took place in 1312, promoters formed two committees, one in Spain and one in Italy. The committees sponsored various events in Rome, Varazze, Brussels, Strasbourg, Madrid and Lanzarote, among other cities.

In 2012 Lanzarote commemorated the 700th anniversary of Malocello's discovery of the Canary Islands with a number of conferences. One of the speakers was Alfonso Licata, who focused on the historical context of the voyage.

A delegation of the mayor and 162 residents of Varazze (Malocello's hometown) visited Lanzarote. They arrived aboard the cruise ship Costa Deliziosa, which followed a route between Italy and Lanzarote emulating the path Malocello likely followed to the Canaries.

An Italian destroyer, the Lanzerotto Malocello, was named after him. It saw action during the Spanish Civil War and World War II.

== See also ==
- Canary Islands

== Sources ==
- Acosta, José Juan; Félix Rodríguez Lorenzo; Carmelo L. Quintero Padrón (1988). Conquista y Colonización. Santa Cruz de Tenerife: Centro de la Cultura Popular Canaria. p. 23.
