= Diogo Gomes =

Portuguese navigator

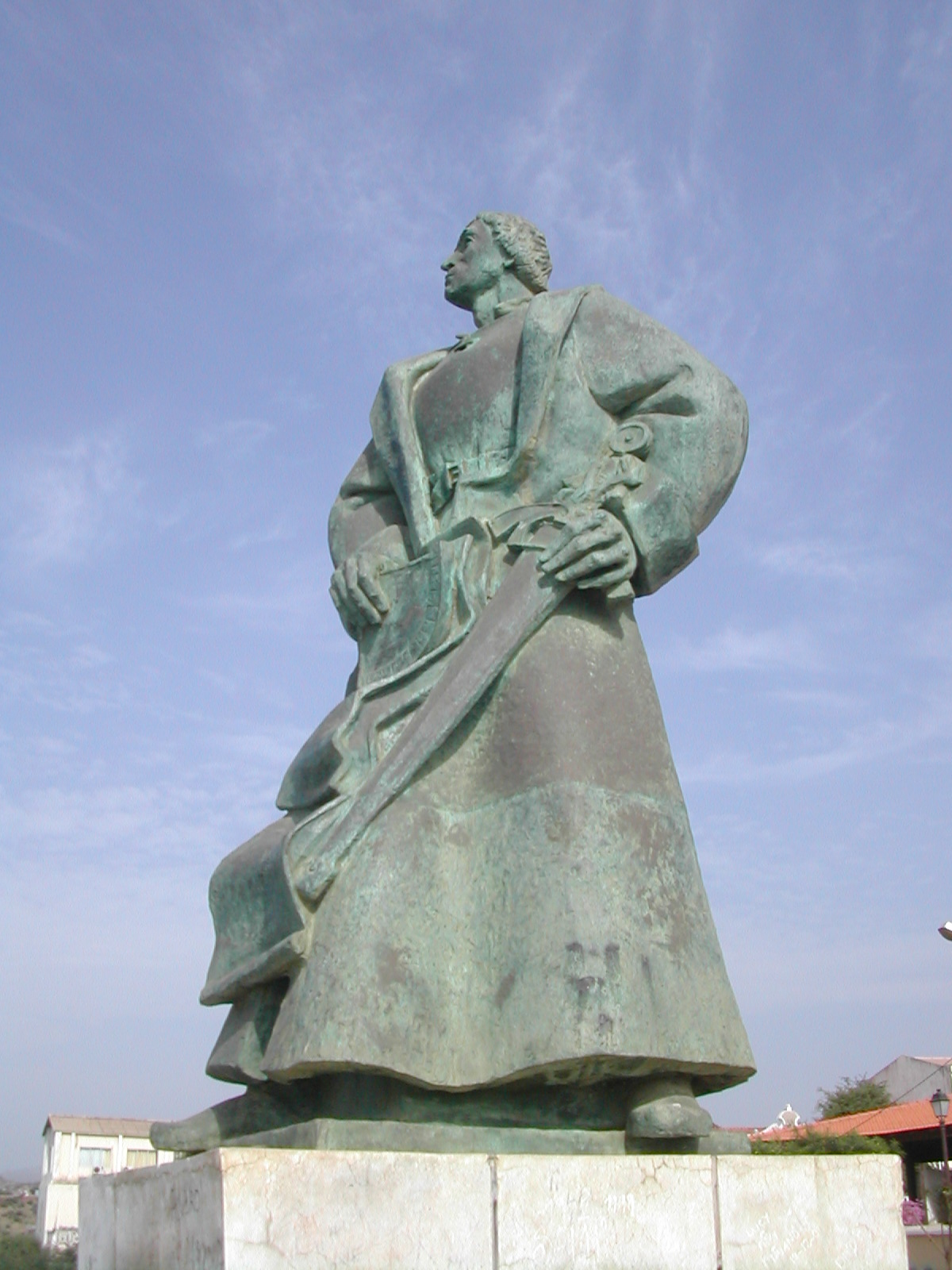
- Statue of Diogo Gomes, Praia, Cape Verde.
- Born: c. 1420; Lagos, Kingdom of Portugal
- Died: c. 1500; Kingdom of Portugal
- Occupations: Navigator, explorer, writer

Diogo Gomes (c. 1420 – c. 1500) was a Portuguese navigator, explorer and writer. Diogo Gomes was a servant and explorer of Portuguese prince, Henry the Navigator. His memoirs were dictated late in his life to Martin Behaim. They are an invaluable (if sometimes inconsistent) account of the Portuguese discoveries under Prince Henry the Navigator, and one of the principal sources upon which historians of the era have drawn. He explored and ascended up the Gambia River in West Africa and discovered some of the Cape Verde islands.

== Early life ==
Probably a native of Lagos, Portugal, Diogo Gomes began as page in the household of Prince Henry the Navigator and subsequently rose to the rank of cavaleiro (knight) by 1440. Diogo Gomes participated in the 1445 slave raid led by Lançarote de Freitas of Lagos on the Arguin banks, and claims to have personally captured 22 Berber slaves single-handedly.

He was named a royal clerk (escrivão da carreagem real) on 12 June 1451, and went on in the service of both Prince Henry and the Portuguese crown.

== Expeditions ==
Circa (approximately) 1456, Gomes was sent out by Prince Henry in command of three vessels down the West African coast. Gomes claims he was accompanied by Jacob, an "Indian" interpreter, which some early historians have taken as a rare indication that Henry envisaged reaching India at this early stage. However, modern historians find this improbable; Russell notes that, at the time, 'Indian' was commonly used as a moniker for an Ethiopian, and the furthest hope that Henry nurtured was of reaching the lands of Prester John.

Gomes is said to have reached as far as Rio Grande (now Geba River, in Guinea Bissau), a huge leap beyond the last point known to be reached by the Portuguese. But strong currents checked Gomes' course and his officers and men feared that they were approaching the extremity of the ocean, so he turned back. On his return, Gomes put in at the Gambia River and ascended up the Gambia a considerable distance, some 50 leagues (250 miles), reaching as far as the major market town of Cantor, an entrepot of the Mali gold trade. Gomes credits himself as the first Portuguese captain to interact peacefully with the natives in this region (all prior expeditions had been fended off or fallen in hostilities on the Senegambian coast, although Alvise Cadamosto had also sailed successfully that same year). At Cantor, Gomes collected much information about the gold mines and trade patterns of the upper Senegal and upper Niger, of the cities of Kukia and Timbuktu and the Trans-Saharan trade routes that stretched to the Moroccan coast.

Although the region was primarily Muslim, Gomes seems to have won over at least one important chief named Numimansa, with his court, to Christianity and Portuguese allegiance. Teixeira da Mota identifies 'Numinansa' as the chieftain of the Nomi Bato, and may have been the same chieftain responsible for the deaths of earlier explorers Nuno Tristão in c.1447 and Vallarte in c.1448. The Nomi Bato are probably ancestral to the current Niominka people of the Saloum River delta, and although currently classified as a Serer tribe, were probably originally Mandinka at the time.

== Return to Portugal ==
By 1459, Gomes was appointed to the lucrative office of almoxarife (receiver of royal customs) of the town of Sintra. He remained in that position until c.1480.

Gomes made another African voyage in 1462 (which some historians date as 1460). He sailed down to the Saloum River delta (Rio dos Barbacins) in Senegal, to enter into trade with the Serer people of Sine and Saloum. There he stumbled upon the caravel of the Genoese captain António de Noli, and they charted a return journey together. On the return, Gomes sailed to the Cape Verde islands and claims to have been the first to land on and name Santiago island (his priority is contested by Cadamosto). Gomes speaks, with some resentment, of how Antonio de Noli managed to reach Lisbon before him and secured the captaincy of Santiago island from the king before his arrival.

Prince Henry having died in 1460; thus after his return, Gomes retired from active exploring and pursued a career with Henry's nephew and heir Ferdinand of Viseu and the royal court. In 1463, he was appointed royal squire (escudeiro) for King Afonso V of Portugal. In 1466, he secured a generous royal pension of 4,800 reals, to which were attached duties as a magistrate in Sintra (juiz das cousas e feitorias contadas de Sintra). At an uncertain date, he was also appointed magistrate in nearby Colares (juiz das sisas da Vila de Colares, for which we have confirmation by 5 March 1482).

== Death ==
His death date is uncertain. Some date it as early as 1485, and one authority has 1482, although historian Peter Russell suggests he lived until at least 1499. There is confirmation he was certainly dead by 1502, from the record of an indulgence for his soul paid for by his widow.

== Memoirs ==
Already in advanced age, Diogo Gomes orally dictated his memoirs to the German cartographer Martin Behaim during the latter's sojourn in Portugal. The date of the relation is uncertain but likely occurred not long before his death. Historian Peter Russell tentatively dates the interview around 1499, as the account refers to the death of António de Noli, which occurred around that time. It is likely Gomes dictated in Portuguese, probably through an interpreter, and Behaim wrote it down in Latin (or alternatively in German, and only later transcribed to Latin).

The resulting memoirs, under the title De prima inuentione Guineae ("Of the first discovery of Guinea"), are the only surviving contemporary manuscript, outside of the official chronicle of Gomes Eanes de Zurara, that attempts to give a chronological account of all the Henrican discoveries. The manuscript has two other parts, De insulis primo inventis in mare Occidentis (an account of Canary Islands and the Madeira group) and De inventione insularum de Acores (containing the only detailed record of the Portuguese discovery of the Azores islands).

Historians generally treat Diogo Gomes's account with caution - his penchant for self-promotion, his advanced age, his attempt to recollect events more than two decades past, misunderstandings by Behaim's interpreter, the haste of the transcription (the Latin is quite poor, suggesting it was hurriedly written) and possibly even some supplementary massaging of the material by editor Valentim Fernandes or Behaim, have conspired to make it an imperfect document, with numerous errors and inconsistencies. Nonetheless, it is an enormously valuable document, containing details that are not found elsewhere.

Among other novelties, Gomes' memoirs are the sole record of what appears to have been the earliest Portuguese expedition, a 1415 expedition to Gran Canaria by João de Trasto (although this is probably just an erroneous reference of the 1424 expedition of Fernando de Castro). Gomes also gives the first detailed account of the rediscovery of the Azores by the Portuguese in Prince Henry's service.

The memoirs are noteworthy for illuminating the character and purpose of Prince Henry the Navigator, ascribing to the prince a deliberate scientific and commercial purpose in exploration. Gomes notes Henry sent out his caravels to search for new lands (ad quaerendas terras) from his wish to know the more distant parts of the western ocean, and in the hope of finding islands or terra firma beyond the limits laid down by Ptolemy (ultra descriptionem Tolomei); on the other hand, his information as to the native trade from Tunis to Timbuktu and the Gambia helped to inspire his persistent exploration of the West African coast to seek those lands by way of the sea. Chart and quadrant were used on the prince's vessels. Henry, at the time of Gomes' first voyage, was in correspondence with an Oran merchant who kept him informed upon events even in Gambian hinterland; and, before the discovery of the Senegal and Cape Verde in 1445, Gomes claims the royal prince had already gained reliable information of the route to Timbuktu. Gomes gives a touching account of the last illness and death of Prince Henry.

There is only one manuscript of Gomes' memoirs, part of a collection of miscellaneous accounts of Portuguese expeditions originally compiled in 1508 by a Lisbon-based German printer known as Valentinus Moravus or (in Portuguese, as "Valentim Fernandes"). This collection remained unpublished and unknown until a copy was discovered in 1845 by J.A. Schmeller in the Hof- und Staats-Bibliothek in Munich (Codex Hisp. 27). The original Latin text was printed in 1847 by Schmeller in the proceedings of the Bavarian Academy of Science. It has since been translated and reprinted several times. A partial English translation was published in 1937, a full French translation in 1959.

== See also ==
- Monumento de Diogo Gomes
