= João de Trasto =

Portuguese mariner

João de Trasto is the name sometimes given to an obscure (and possibly fictional) Portuguese mariner, who is alleged to have captained the first exploratory expedition dispatched by Prince Henry the Navigator in 1415.

The only record of João de Trasto or the 1415 expedition is a brief mention in the personal memoirs of Diogo Gomes, a former Henrican captain. According to Gomes, "Johannes de Trasto" commanded an expedition in 1415, dispatched by Henry the Navigator. Probably departing from the port of Lagos, the Trasto expedition was forced by foul weather to the part of the Grand Canary island subsequently called Telli. Returning to Portugal, he again encountered a fierce storm and only with great difficulty arrived in port.

The writer Diogo Gomes was not an eyewitness to the event (Gomes was not born until the 1420s) and his memoirs were dictated many decades later, at the end of his life, c.1490s, and are known to contain numerous small errors of dates and facts. As the historian R.H. Major writes, after retelling the Trasto story in his 1868 edition, "there is however so much that is manifestly inaccurate in other statements of Diego Gomes respecting the early voyages which he narrates from hearsay, that we cannot be perfectly sure that the date here applied to the earliest expedition is correct." In later editions of his work, Major removed all mention of "João de Trasto".

As a result, most historians have doubted the existence of 'João de Trasto' and this expedition. It is usually omitted in modern scholarly histories of the Portuguese discoveries.

Some historians have suggested that Diogo Gomes probably meant to refer to D. Fernando de Castro, who is indeed recorded to have led a failed expedition to Gran Canaria for Henry the Navigator in 1424. Indeed, it seems "Trasto" is a mistranscription in the first (1847) printed edition of Diogo Gomes's letter, that the original manuscript actually read "Crasto" (probably meaning "Castro"). Castro did have a brother named João, and that might have been the source of confusion, or alternatively, Gomes's interpreter or transcriber simply misheard "João" for "Fernão".
