= Cape Chaunar =

Cape in southern Morocco

Cape Chaunar Cabo de Não (Cape Nun)
- Location in Morocco
- Coordinates: 29°16′N 10°018′W
- Country: Morocco

Cape Chaunar, Cap Uarsig, Cape Nun, Cap Noun, Cabo de Não or Nant is a cape on the Atlantic coast of Africa, in southern Morocco, between Tarfaya and Sidi Ifni. By the 15th century it was considered insurmountable by Arabs and Europeans, thus resulting in the name meaning cape "no" in Portuguese. Cape Chaunar is the true northern coastal limit of the Sahara desert, although nearby Cape Bojador is frequently mistakenly called this.

== History ==
The thirteenth-century Genovese navigators Vandino and Ugolino Vivaldi may have sailed as far as Cape Nun before being lost at sea. It was named Cabo do Não ("Cape No") by Portuguese mariners during the fifteenth century, being considered the impassable limit for Arab and European sailors, the non plus ultra beyond which no navigation could occur. This was due to the cape running far out into the sea, causing it to break and appear dangerous. "Quem o passa tornará ou não" (whoever passes it will make it or not), wrote Venetian explorer Alvise Cadamosto in his book Navigazione. Starting in 1417, exploratory vessels were sent by Prince Henry the Navigator, managing to cross Cape Non and reaching Cape Bojador, then considered the southern limit of the world, stretching into the "dark sea" (Latin Mare Tenebrarum, Mare Tenebrosum or Bahr al-Zulumat in Arabic), the medieval name for the southern Atlantic Ocean, inaccessible to the sailors of the time.

== Sources ==
- Robert Kerr, General History and Collection of Voyages and Travels
- Chambers Book of Days November 20th
- Bookrags.com Info
