= Monumento de Diogo Gomes =

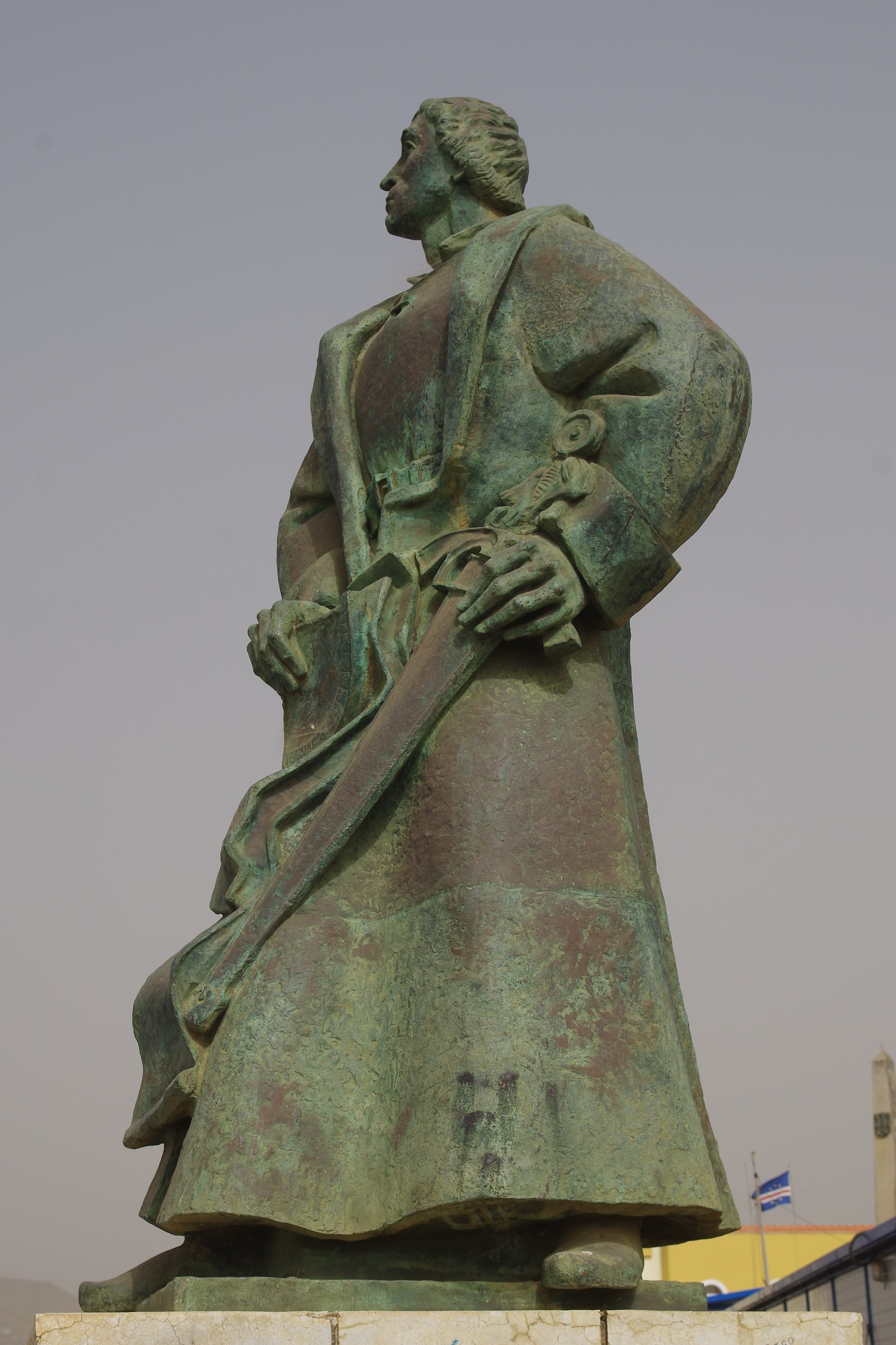
- Statue of Diogo Gomes
- Interactive map of Monumento de Diogo Gomes
- Location: Praia, Cape Verde
- Coordinates: 14.9159°N 23.5096°W
- Designer: Joaquim Correia
- Material: cast iron
- Height: 5.15 m (16.9 ft)
- Completion date: 1956
- Dedicated to: Diogo Gomes

The Monumento de Diogo Gomes is a statue at the south end of the Plateau, the historic centre of Praia, on the island of Santiago, Cape Verde. It represents Diogo Gomes, the Portuguese navigator who was one of the discoverers of the island of Santiago in 1460. The cast iron statue was created by the Portuguese sculptor Joaquim Correia in 1956. The statue itself is 3.3 m tall, and stands on a 1.85 m high pedestal. It stands close to the Presidential Palace, and overlooks the beach of Gamboa.
