= Alvise Cadamosto =

Venetian explorer and slave trader (c. 1432–1483)

Alvise Cadamosto (Note: European Portuguese: [alˈvizɨ kɐðaˈmoʃtu]; Italian: [alˈviːze kadaˈmosto]. Surname variously spelled as Ca' da Mosto, da Cadamosto, da Ca' da Mosto; also known in Portuguese as Luís Cadamosto; mononymously Cadamosto.) (c. 1432 – 16 July 1483) was a Venetian explorer and slave trader, who was hired by the Portuguese prince Henry the Navigator and undertook two known journeys to West Africa in 1455 and 1456, accompanied by the Genoese captain Antoniotto Usodimare. Some have credited Cadamosto and his companions with the discovery of the Cape Verde Islands and the points along the Guinea coast from the Gambia River to the Geba River (in Guinea-Bissau), the greatest leap in the Henrican discoveries since 1446. Cadamosto's accounts of his journeys, including his detailed observations of West African societies, have proven invaluable to historians.

== Background ==
Alvise was born at the Ca' da Mosto, a palace on the Grand Canal of Venice from which his name derives. His father was Giovanni da Mosto, a Venetian civil servant and merchant, and his mother Elizabeth Querini, from a leading patrician family of Venice. Alvise was the eldest of three sons, having younger brothers Pietro and Antonio.

At a remarkably young age, Alvise was cast out as a merchant adventurer, sailing with Venetian galleys in the Mediterranean. From 1442 to 1448, Alvise undertook various trips on Venetian galleys to the Barbary Coast and Crete, as a commercial agent of his cousin, Andrea Barbarigo. In 1451, he was appointed noble officer of the marine corps of crossbowmen on a galley to Alexandria. The next year, he served the same position on a Venetian galley to Flanders. Upon his return, he found his family disgraced and dispossessed. His father, caught in a bribery scandal, had been banished from Venice, and taken refuge in the Duchy of Modena. His Querini relatives took the opportunity to seize possession of his family's property. This setback marred the future prospects of Cadamosto's career in Venice, and probably encouraged his spirit of adventure, hoping to restore his family name and fortune with great feats of his own.

== Expeditions to Africa ==
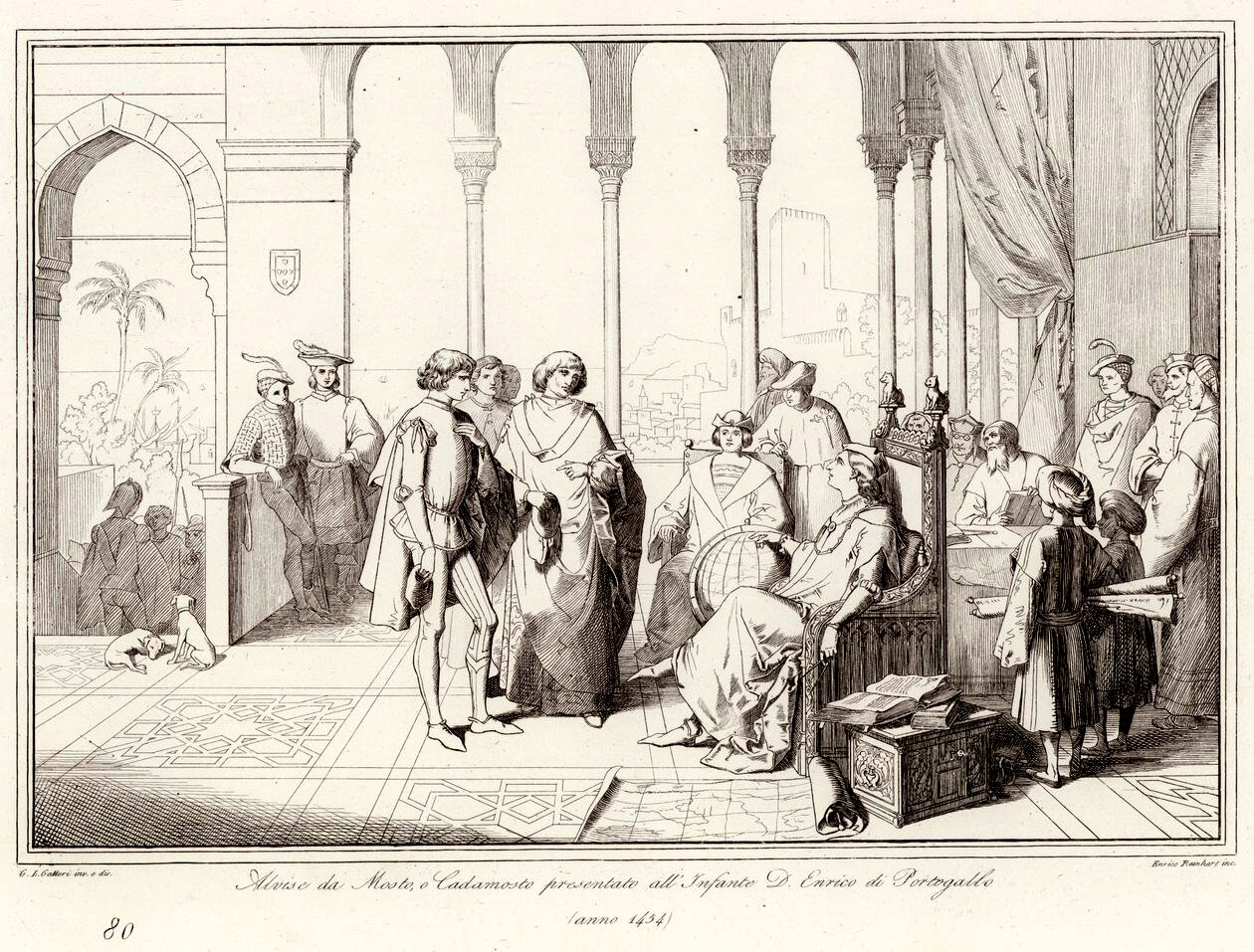
Alvise is presented to Prince Henry of Portugal

In August 1454, at the age of 22, Alvise and his brother Antonio embarked on a Venetian merchant galley, captained by Marco Zen, destined for Flanders. On the outward journey, the galley was detained by bad weather near Cape St. Vincent, Portugal. While waiting for the weather to improve, the Portuguese Prince Henry the Navigator, who had his seat nearby at Sagres, dispatched a couple of his commercial agents, led by his secretary Antão Gonçalves and the local Venetian consul Patrizio di Conti, to interest the stranded Venetian merchants in opening trade contracts for sugar and other goods from the prince's Madeira island. Informed by the visitors of Henry's recent discoveries in Africa, Cadamosto, "inflamed with the desire of visiting these newly discovered regions", immediately applied to Prince Henry at his residence at Raposeira to undertake an expedition on his behalf. Henry hired him on the spot.

(Note: the 16th-century Portuguese chronicler Damião de Góis, uniquely among historians, mistakenly asserted that Cadamosto's encounter took place in 1444 rather that 1454. Given the eminence of Góis, this erroneous dating has been cited by others, and has been a cause of much confusion for later histories and chronologies.)

=== First Journey (1455) ===
Alvise Cadamosto set out on 22 March 1455 on a 43-tonne caravel supplied by Prince Henry, with Vicente Dias as ship master He proceeded to Porto Santo and Madeira, and thereafter weaved his way through the Canary islands, making stops in La Gomera, El Hierro and La Palma before reaching the African coast around Cape Blanc. Cadamosto made note of the existence of the Portuguese factory-fort at Arguin, but does not seem to have stopped there himself.

Cadamosto cruised down the west African coast to the mouth of the Senegal River (which he calls the Rio do Senega, the first recorded use of that name.) He does not seem to have stopped here, his destination being further south, at an anchorage point along the Grande Côte he called the Palma di Budomel (location uncertain, probably around Mboro, 15°09′42″N 16°55′45″W). Cadamosto notes that this spot (or resgate) was already used by Portuguese traders. He dates that trade between the Portuguese and the Wolof people of the Senegal region was opened around 1450 ("five years before I went on this voyage").

Cadamosto had sought to trade Iberian horses for black slaves, the principal line of business at this resgate. Horses were highly valued on the Senegalese coast, and traded at a rate of between 9 and 14 slaves per horse. Cadamosto is said to have sold seven horses and some woolen goods (a total value of around 300 ducats) for about 100 slaves.

While at the anchorage, Cadamosto was surprised to be met by the ruler himself, the Damel of Cayor (whom he calls Budomel), accompanied by his retinue. The Damel invited him inland while the details of the trade were finalized. Cadamosto spent nearly an entire month in an inland village, hosted by the prince Bisboror (Budomel's nephew), during which time he delighted in observing much about the local country and customs.

His trade in Cayor completed, Cadamosto decided to cruise further down the coast, towards the Cape Vert peninsula. This was intended as a pure exploratory jaunt, "to discover new countries" beyond the Cape, more specifically the mysterious "kingdom called Gambra", where Prince Henry had heard (from earlier slave captives) that gold was found in abundance. Around Cape Vert, in June 1455, Cadamosto came across two Portuguese caravels, one of which was commanded by Antoniotto Usodimare, a Genoese captain in Prince Henry's service, the other by an unnamed squire of Henry's household. They agreed to join forces and proceeded south together.

After a brief fishing stop on some unnamed islands (probably Îles des Madeleines), Cadamosto, Usodimare and the Portuguese squire sailed south, down the Petite Côte until they reached the Sine-Saloum delta, a stretch inhabited by the Sereri (Serer people). Cadamosto has nothing good to say about the Serer, characterizing them as savage idolaters "of great cruelty" (although we should note at this point his information is being drawn principally from Wolof interpreters). Cadamosto claims he was the one who named the Saloum River as the Rio di Barbacini, the name by which it would remain known on European maps thereafter. Cadamosto and Usodimare tried to put in there, but quickly decided against it when an interpreter they landed to make contact with the local Serer natives gathered on the beaches was killed on the spot.

Pressing south, Cadamosto and Usodimare finally discovered the mouth of the Gambia River in late June or early July 1455. They set about sailing upriver, but their advance faced unremitting hostility from the Mandinka inhabitants upriver. Subjected to intense missile fire, they barely fended off a massed canoe attack that sought to trap and board them. According to Cadamosto's interpreters, the Mandinka believed the Portuguese were cannibals, that they had come to the region to buy black men to eat. Urged by their frightened crews, Cadamosto decided to call off venturing further and backed out of the river. Cadamosto does not supply details of the return trip to Portugal.

At the mouth of the Gambia, Cadamosto made a note of the near-disappearance of the northern Pole Star on the horizon, and roughly sketched a bright constellation to the south, believed to be the first known depiction of the Southern Cross constellation (albeit wrongly positioned by the printer and with too many stars – a more accurate rendition would have to wait until Mestre João Faras in 1500.) Cadamosto called it the carro dell' ostro (southern chariot).

While it is clear that Cadamosto traded in Cayor for slaves, it is unlikely that he sojourned for exploratory adventures south on a caravel carrying human cargo. At least there is no suggestion in his account that he was carrying a shipload of slaves at the time. It is most likely that after the terms were negotiated, Cadamosto had to wait for some time for the Damel of Cayor (or the slave traders he had contracted with) to assemble and deliver the enslaved persons. Cadamosto likely undertook the exploratory southern journey during this waiting period, and probably stopped again at Cayor to finally pick up the enslaved persons on his return to Portugal. But this is conjectural, as Cadamosto gives no details of his return journey.

It is known that the fleet was back in Portugal before the end of the year, as Antoniotto Usodimare would write a letter dated 12 December 1455 to his creditors back in Genoa, reporting the results of his voyage (albeit with much exaggeration, and without mentioning Cadamosto).

=== Second Journey (1456) ===
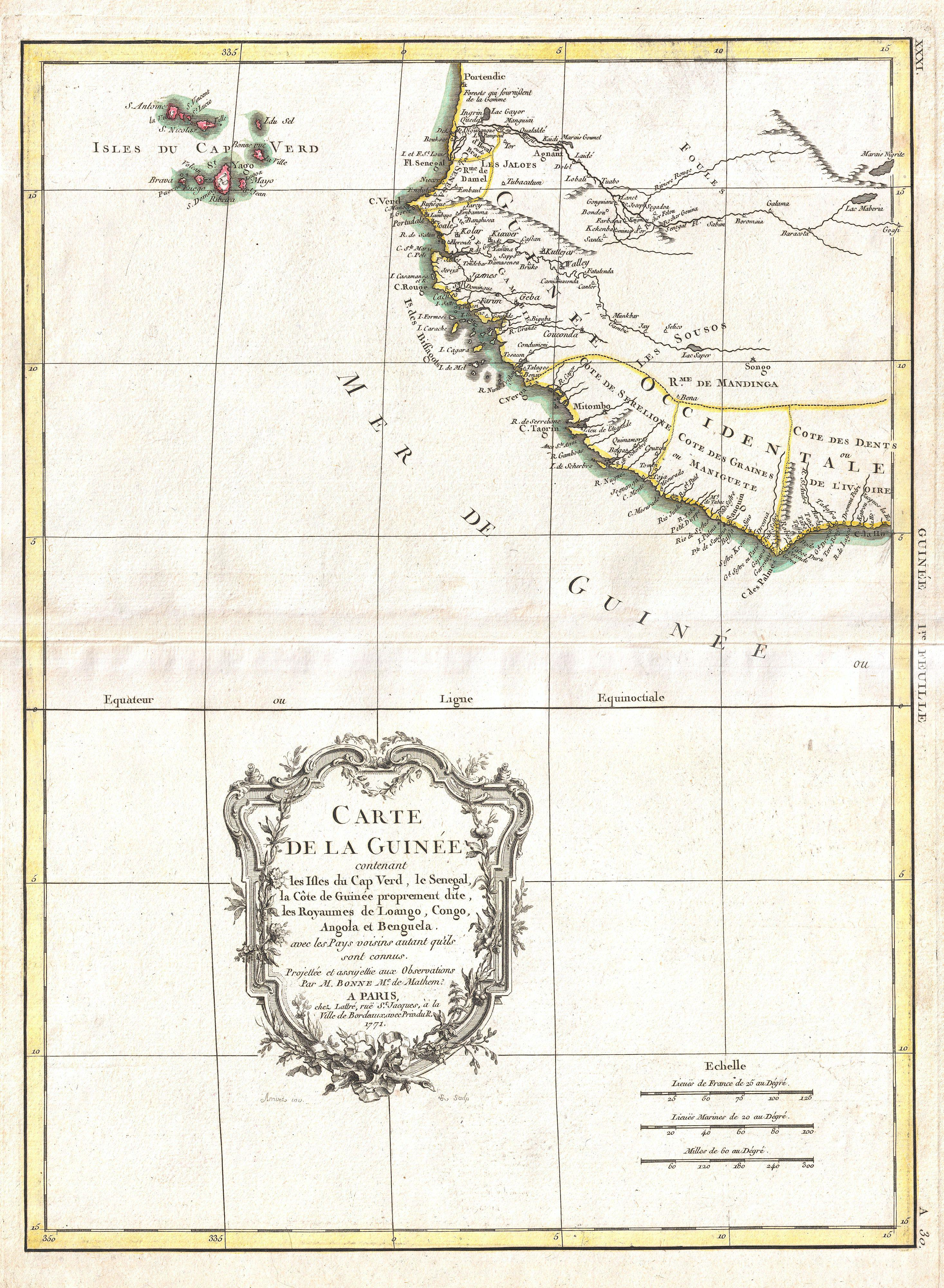
Map of the Cape Verde islands and the Guinea coast, c. 1771

Cadamosto set out again from Lagos in May 1456, this time not alone, but together with Antoniotto Usodimare and another caravel with an unnamed Portuguese captain, another servant of Prince Henry. The three vessels made no known trading stops, intending to sail straight to the Gambia River (probably per Prince Henry's instructions).

Catching a storm around Cape Vert peninsula, the little fleet was forced to sail west, away from the coast for two days and three nights (about 300 miles) and stumbled on the as-yet-undiscovered archipelago of the Cape Verde Islands. Cadamosto, Usodimare and the unnamed captain scouted several of the uninhabited islands, believing them to be four in number (although Cadamosto notes in his account that later explorers would find them to be ten). They anchored first on an island which they named Buona Vista (Boa Vista), before proceeding on to a larger island, which they named San Jacobo (Santiago) (according to Cadamosto, on account of it being the feast of SS. Philip and James – probably an error) Finding the islands uninteresting, they headed on.

(Note: although Cadamosto claims credit for the discovery of the Cape Verde islands, this is disputed by Diogo Gomes, who claims he discovered the islands, together with Antonio da Noli, in 1462 (sometimes dated 1460))

Cadamosto, Usodimare and the unnamed Portuguese captain proceeded to enter the Gambia River again, albeit this time without opposition. They sailed about 10 Italian miles (15 km) upriver and anchored briefly on a river island they named Santo Andrea (to bury a deceased crew member, named Andrea; the island is believed to be modern Dog Island).

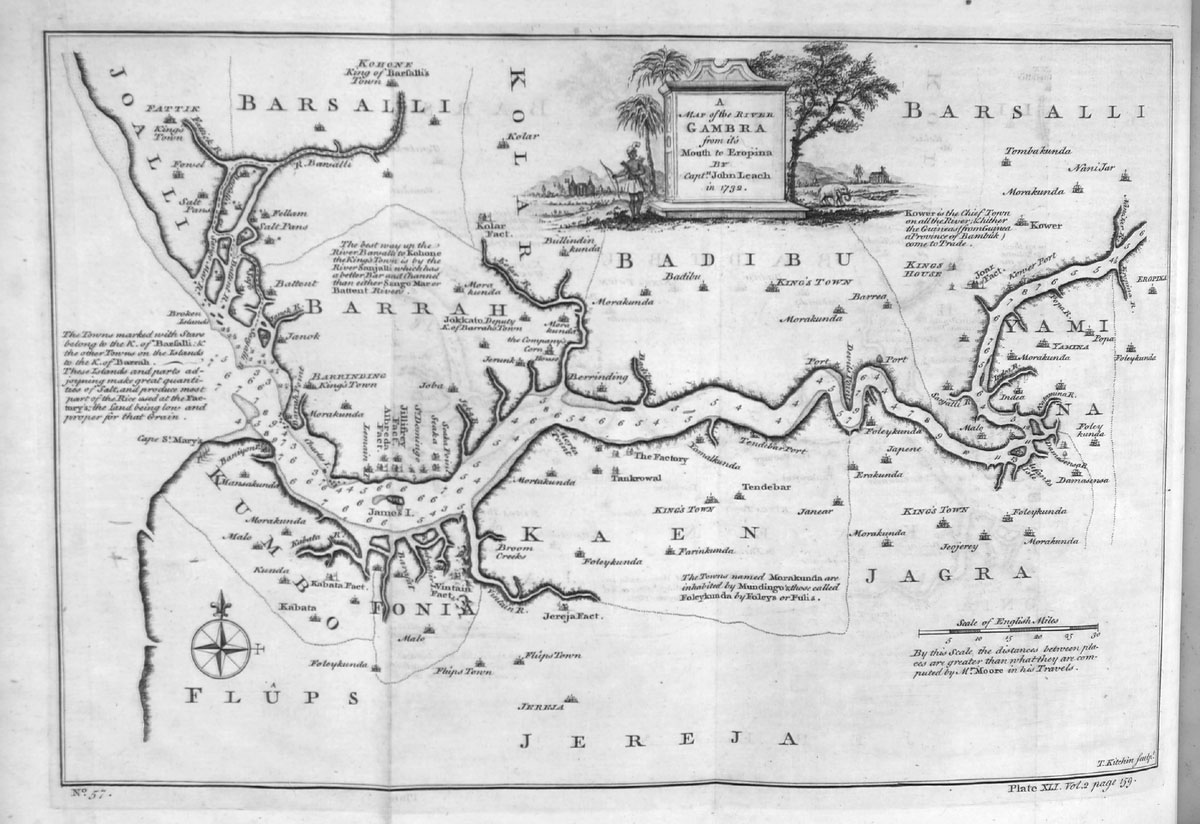
Map of the Gambia River and surrounding area, c. 1732

The trio proceeded upriver carefully, warily watched by native Mandinka canoes, but this time no hostilities or ambushes emerged. Eventually, one of the interpreters managed to entice some of the canoe-borne natives aboard the Portuguese ships and opened peaceful contact. The natives identified themselves as subjects of king Forosangoli (of the southern bank of the Gambia) and that he, and most other Mandinka kings along the Gambia river were all vassal subjects of the Emperor of Mali (Impatore di Melli), and that some of the local kings were willing to meet the Portuguese. Following the instructions of his interlocutors, Cadamosto sailed some 60 Italian miles up the Gambia river, reaching the residence of the Mandinka king he called Battimansa, Mandinka for "king of the Batti' (probably Badibu, on the north side of the river). They were well received, but disappointed at the little evidence of the large amounts of gold they had expected to find. They engaged in some petty trade with the locals, in particular musk (invaluable to European perfumers), and imply they even acquired live specimens of African civet cat.

Cadamosto mentions interacting with another lord, Guumimensa, whose dominion was closer to the mouth of the river. This is probably the formidable 'Niumimansa', king of the Niumi-Banta of Barra region, whose rule extended over Niumi-Bato (Niominka) of the Diombos River shore, an old antagonist of Portuguese explorers. However, Cadamosto reports their relations went quite smoothly.

Cadamosto and his companions stayed in Badibu for 11 days, before departing. They did not discover the commercial center of Cantor, which was still several miles upriver (it was only discovered a couple of years later, by Diogo Gomes). But he did discover malaria, and his crew quickly fell ill with fevers. It was probably this epidemic that prompted Cadamosto to cut short his stay and leave the Gambia river, back to the ocean, where the fevers seemed to have subsided.

Resolved to continue exploring the West African coast, Cadamosto's trio set sail south, doubling Cape St. Mary (13°29′10″N 16°40′6″W) and carefully navigating the dangerous breakers around Bald Cape (13°22′47″N 16°47′43″W), reporting a couple of rivers along the way (none of which he names). A few days later, Cadamosto and his companions discovered the mouth of the Casamance River (12°33′22″N 16°45′44″W). They named the river after the local lord Casamansa, king ('mansa') of Kasa (called Casangas by later Portuguese, a now near-extinct people, related to the Bainuk people). They sent a couple of launches to land to open contact, but being told the king was absent on campaign, Cadamosto did not linger but decided to continue on.

Sailing south, the fleet reached a red-colored headland they named Capo Rosso (Cape Roxo, 12°20′8″N 16°42′47″W, today marking the border between the republic of Senegal and Guinea-Bissau). In his account, Cadamosto names two large rivers beyond the Cape Roxo promontory – Santa Anna and San Dominico – which are a little confusing. It is believed one is likely to be the Cacheu River (12°10′32″N 16°20′47″W, often indicated in later Portuguese maps as Rio de São Domingos) while the other river is probably one of the branches (Rio de Jatta or Rio das Ancoras) of the Mansôa River (11°51′34″N 15°58′24″W)

A day later, Cadamosto discovered a great river (grandissimo fiume), which they named Rio Grande (the Geba River – more precisely, the wide estuary it forms together with the Corubal River, it doesn't seem they actually entered the river itself) (11°45′N 15°38′W). After anchoring near the southern bank of the estuary, they were approached by a couple of long native canoes from the mainland (no identification given, probably Balantas or Biafares) A few trinkets were traded with the canoes, but they were unable to open communication, as their on-ship interpreters (Wolof and/or Mandinka) did not understand their native language. After a couple of days, they lifted anchor and made their way to some "of the many islands in the sea" (the Bissagos Islands), but found it just as impossible to communicate with the inhabitants there.

Given the language barrier, they saw no point in proceeding further. Cadamosto, Usodimare and the unnamed Portuguese captain set sail back to Portugal.

=== Achievement ===
The record of Portuguese discoveries prior to Alvise Cadamosto did not seem to have gone beyond the Sine-Saloum delta. The furthest pre-Cadamosto seems to have been the singular expedition of Álvaro Fernandes in 1446, which may have reached as far as Cape Roxo, but this was not followed up. The 1447 expedition led by Estêvão Afonso did not go beyond the beginning of the estuary of the Gambia River, and thereafter expeditions below Cape Vert were largely suspended by Prince Henry. The principal barrier to the Portuguese seems to have been belligerence of the Niumi-Bato (Niominka) and the Niumi-Banta (Mandinka of Niumi (Barra)), both led by the same king, Niumimansa. Cadamosto encountered that hostility on his first expedition of 1455. But on his second trip, in 1456, opposition fell away for some reason, and he managed to become the first European (along with Antoniotto Usodimare and their anonymous companions) to sail up the Gambia River. It is uncertain what caused this change of attitude from one year to the next – a new Niumimansa? A shift in senegambian politics? The unreliable Diogo Gomes later boasted that he sailed to the Gambia sometime between 1456 and 1458 and single-handedly negotiated a peace with the Niumimansa, although this is likely exaggerated.)

Once they opened the Gambia River, Cadamosto and Usodimare led the next great leap of Henrican discoveries in Africa – Cape Verde islands, the Casamance River, Cape Roxo, Cacheu River and finally the Geba River and Bissagos Islands. The length of coast they discovered in 1456 was the greatest leap in the Portuguese era of discoveries since 1446. Much the same coast would be covered again by Diogo Gomes around 1458 (possibly as early as 1456, probably sent by Henry as a follow-up to Cadamosto's report) and 1462. Cadamosto's furthest marker would only really be surpassed by Pedro de Sintra in 1461–62.

== Return to Venice ==
After his return in 1456, Cadamosto continued to live in Lagos for many years, suggesting he must have continued to engage, directly or indirectly, in West African commerce. It is not known whether Cadamosto himself made any further trips down the African coast. Cadamosto bluntly states that there were no other voyages of exploratory significance by anyone after 1456, until the expedition of Pedro de Sintra in 1462. Cadamosto acquired the details of that expedition from Sintra's clerk upon its return.

Cadamosto's patron, Prince Henry the Navigator, died in November 1460, and the monopoly on African trade reverted to the Portuguese crown and its operations were gradually transferred from Lagos to Lisbon. Probably seeing no future for himself in the new order, Cadamosto left Portugal and returned to Venice in February 1463. Cadamosto is believed to have brought notes, logs and several nautical maps with him. Cadamosto used these to compose his famous Navigazioni sometime in the mid-1460s. The Navigazioni, besides generally hailing the Portuguese discoveries and lionizing Prince Henry, provided detailed accounts of three expeditions – his own voyages of 1455 and 1456, and the voyage of Pedro de Sintra in 1462. He is believed to have delivered much of his primary material to the Venetian cartographer Grazioso Benincasa, as Benincasa went on to produce an atlas in 1468, depicting the West African coast with remarkable accuracy.

The Navigazioni were probably written in an effort to advertise his accomplishments, and rescue his family name. Upon his return, Cadamosto managed to recover some of his family's property from his Querini relatives and, a couple of years later, married Elisabetta di Giorgio Venier, a rich noblewoman but of frail health – she died without bearing him a child. He returned to commerce, with trading interests as far afield as Spain, Alexandria, Syria and England, and with fortune and connections restored, carved out a diplomatic and administrative career for the Republic of Venice alongside it. Cadamosto served as Venetian proveditor in Cattaro, then in Corone, and was sent on diplomatic missions to Dalmatia and Herzegovina. After the fall of Negroponte in 1470, Cadamosto was placed in charge of devising a plan for the defense of Albania against the Ottomans.

In 1481, Alvise Cadamosto was elected captain of the Venetian Alexandria galley fleet, ending his naval career on the same ships where he started. He died in 1483, in the Polesine, while on diplomatic mission to Rovigo to assess the spoils acquired by the Venetian Republic after their victory over Ercole I d'Este, Duke of Ferrara in the War of Ferrara. (although in some accounts, the date of his death is sometimes given as early as 1477 and as late as 1488).

== The Navigazioni ==
For historians of the Portuguese discoveries under Henry the Navigator, Alvise Cadamosto's accounts, the Navigazioni, have proven to be an invaluable document. Cadamosto's accounts, Gomes Eanes de Zurara's chronicle and the memoirs of Diogo Gomes, are practically all that remain of the contemporary written record of the Henrican discoveries. Indeed, until the publication of João de Barros's Decadas da Asia in 1552 (which drew on a manuscript draft of Zurara's chronicle), Cadamosto's Navigazioni was the only published work circulating in Europe about the Portuguese discoveries. Cadamosto emphasized the central role of Prince Henry, and was instrumental in building up the image of the Navigator Prince for posterity. Compared to the hagiographic Zurara and the fallible Gomes, historians have relished and lauded the reliability and detail provided by Cadamosto, giving a richer and clearer view of how the Henrican enterprise operated.

Cadamosto's accounts are also invaluable for historians of Africa, providing the first written detailed accounts of the Senegambia region, beyond the fringes touched one century earlier by Arab historian Ibn Battuta. Cadamosto gives a summary of contemporary European knowledge about West Africa. He describes the Mali Empire (Melli) and the Trans-Saharan trade, e.g. how Berber caravans carry the Saharan salt from desert pans like Teghaza (Tegazza) to frontier cities like Timbuctu (Tombutto). He goes to explain how gold coming out of the heart of Mali goes out in three parts, one to Cochia (Kukiya) and then eastwards onto Egypt, the second via Timbuctu to Toet (Tuat) and then north towards Tunisia, and a third part, also via Timbuctu, goes west to Hoden (Ouadane), destined for Morocco, part of which is deviated to the Portuguese factory at Arguin.

Cadamosto is the first known person to refer to the Senegal River by its recognizably modern name (Rio di Senega) rather than the "western Nile". Cadamosto notes that the Senegal was probably the Niger of ancient geographers (e.g. Ptolomey). He repeats the old error of assuming that the Senegal river and the (actual) Niger river are connected to each other, forming one great east–west river, and relates the legend that it was believed to be a tributary of the great Biblical river of Gihon (Gion) that flowed from the Garden of Eden across the lands of Aethiopia.

Cadamosto describes the Wolof (Gilofi) empire, which he notes was bound on the east by the Fula Tekrur/Toucouleur (Tuchusor) and to the south by the Mandinka states of the Gambia River (Gambra) Cadamosto goes into quite some detail on the politics, society and culture of the Wolof states. He supplies a meticulously detailed eyewitness description of the Cayor village he stayed in 1455, the Damel's court, the people, customs, economy, local fauna and flora, etc. The details demonstrate Cadamosto's sheer curiosity – he describes the courtly customs, the houses, the use of cowrie shells as currency, the food and drink, the operation of local markets, livestock and cultivation, the production of palm wine, weapons, the dances and music, the reaction to European novelties (clothes, ships, cannon, bag-pipes). In all this, Cadamosto's narrative evinces a degree of honest curiosity and absence of prejudice perhaps surprising for a European of that era. Cadamosto attempts a similarly detailed account of the Mandinka people of the Gambia River, making particular note of their abundant cotton (rare in Wolof areas), although not nearly as complete, as he did not seem to venture much away from his boats there. He does not cease to marvel at the extraordinary wildlife which is far more plentiful around the Gambia, notably the hippopotamus (which he calls the "horse fish") and the largely unfamiliar African elephant (whose meat he was tempted to taste – a piece of which he salted and brought back to Portugal for Prince Henry himself; a preserved elephant's foot would be forwarded to Henry's sister, Isabella, Duchess of Burgundy.).

=== Editions ===
Alvise Cadamosto's accounts were first published in Italian at the head of the famous 1507 collection Paesi novamente retrovati, edited by Francazano Montalboddo and published in Vicenza. It was quickly followed by translations into Latin (1508), German (1508) and French (1515). The Italian version was reprinted in the famous Ramusio collection of 1550. Although reprinted and widely disseminated in other countries, a Portuguese translation did not appear until 1812.

Cadamosto was also long alleged to be the author of the Portolano del mare, a rutter with sailing directions for the Mediterranean Sea coasts, found in the library of St. Mark in Venice, with the publication stamp of Bernardo Rizzo in 1490. Cadamosto's authorship of the portolano has been generally discarded in modern times.

Editions of Cadamosto's Navigazioni:

- Original (1507), as opening chapters of Francanzano Montalboddo, editor, Paesi novamente retrovati et Novo Mondo da Alberico Vesputio Florentino intitulato, published in Vicenza, 1507. (reprinted 1508, 1512, 1519, 1521). Cadamosto's account of his 1455 and 1456 voyages starts with title: "Libro Primo: In comenza el libro de la prima Navigatione per loceano a le terre de Nigri de la Bassa Ethiopia per comandamento del Illust. Signor Infante Don Hurich fratello de Don Dourth Re de Portogallo" (Cap. 1 through Cap. 47) is the 1455 & 1456 Cadamosto voyages. Cadamosto's account of Pedro de Sintra is at the beginning of the next section, "Libro Secundo: De la Navigatione de Lisbona a Callichut de lengua Portogallese intaliana", starting with heading "Chi scriprireno noui paesi cum li sui nomi" (Cap. 48–50).
- Latin (1508) trans. of Montalboddo's 1507 Paesi by Archangelo Madrigini, Abbot of Casalo, as Itinerarium Portugallensium e Lusitania in Indiam et Inde in Occidentem et Demum ad Aquilonem published in Milan, 1508. This Latin translation was reprinted in Simon Grynaeus, Novus orbis regnorum et insularum veteribus incognitorum, 1532.
- German (1508) trans. by Jobstein Ruchamer, in Newe unbekante landte und ein newe weldte in kurt verganger zeythe erfunden, published in Nuremberg, 1508
- French (1515): trans. by Mathurin du Redouer, Sensuyt le Nouveau monde & navigations faictes par Emeric Vespuce Florentin: Dez pays & isles nouvellement trouvez auparavant a nous inconneuz tant en l'Ethiope que Arrabie, Calichut et aultres plusiers regions estranges, published in Paris, 1515. (1916 reprint online) (Reprint 1895, C. Schefer ed., Relation des voyages à la côte occidentale d'Afrique d'Alvise de Ca' da Mosto, 1455–1457, Paris: Leroux online; New translation by Frédérique Verrier (1994) Voyages en Afrique Noire d'Alvise Ca'da Mosto (1455 & 1456). Paris: Chandeigne.)
- Italian (Ramusio ed.): "Il Libro di Messer Alvise Ca da Mosto Gentilhuomo Venetiano" & "Navigatione del Capitano Pietro di Sintra Portoghese scritta per il medesimo M. Alvise da Ca da Mosto", as printed in Venice (1550), by Giovanni Battista Ramusio, ed., Primo volume delle Navigazioni et viaggi nel qua si contine la descrittione dell'Africa, et del paese del Prete Ianni, on varii viaggi, dal mar Rosso a Calicut,& infin all'isole Molucche, dove nascono le Spetierie et la navigatione attorno il mondo. online
- English: "Original Journals of the Voyages of Cada Mosto and Piedro de Cintra to the Coast of Africa, the former in the years 1455 and 1456, and the latter soon afterwards", reprinted in R. Kerr, 1811, A General History of Voyages and Travels to the end of the 18th century, vol. 2, Edinburgh: Blackwood. Ch.4 [Another English edition is found G.R. Crone, ed, 1937, The Voyages of Cadamosto, London: Haklyut]
- Portuguese: "Navegações de Luiz de Cadamosto, a que se ajuntou a viagem de Pedro de Cintra, capitão Portuguez, traduzidas to Italiano.", in Academia Real das Sciencias, 1812, Collecção de noticias para a historia e geografia das nações ultramarinas: que vivem nos dominios portuguezes, ou lhes são visinhas, vol. 2, Pt.1 offprint

Apocryphal (not Cadamosto, but attributed to him in the past):

- Unknown (1490) Il Portolano del mare di Alvise da Mosto, nobile Veneto, nel qual si dichiara minutamente del sito di tutti i Porti, quali sono da Venezia in Levante et in Ponente et d'altre cose utilissime & necessarie ai naviganti. 1806 ed., Venice: Silvestro Gnoato. online

== See also ==
- List of explorers
- Explorations (disambiguation)

== Sources and further reading ==
- J. Brotton (1998) Trading territories: mapping the early modern world, Cornell University Press
- Bühnen, S. (1992) "Place Names as an Historical Source: An Introduction with Examples from Southern Senegambia and Germany", History in Africa, Vol. 19, pp. 45–101
- Castilho, A.M. de (1866) Descripção e roteiro da costa occidental de Africa, desde o cabo de Espartel até o das Agulhas. 2 vols, Lisbon: Impresa Nacional. vol. 1
- Cortesão, Armando (1931) "Subsídios para a história do Descobrimento de Cabo Verde e Guiné", Boletim da Agencia Geral das Colonias, No. 75. As reprinted in 1975, Esparsos, vol. 1, Coimbra. online
- G.R. Crone, ed. (1937) The Voyages of Cadamosto and other documents on Western Africa in the second half of the fifteenth century, London: Hakluyt.
- da Mosto, Andrea (1883) "Il portulano attribuito ad Alvise da Cà da Mosto", Bollettino della Società geografica italiana, vol. 30, p. 540 offprint
- Diffie, Bailey W., and George D. Winius (1977) Foundations of the Portuguese empire, 1415–1580. Minneapolis, MN: University of Minnesota Press
- Damião de Góis (1567) Chronica do prinçipe Dom Ioam: rei que foi destes regnos segundo do nome, em que summariamente se trattam has cousas sustançiaes que nelles aconteçerão do dia de seu nasçimento atte ho em que el Rei Dom Afonso seu pai faleçeo, 1905 edition, A.J. Gonçálvez Guimarãis ed. Coimbra: Imprensa da Universidade. online
- Diogo Gomes De prima inventione Guineae (Portuguese translation by Gabriel Pereira (1898–99) as "As Relações do Descobrimento da Guiné e das ilhas dos Açores, Madeira e Cabo Verde" in Boletim da Sociedade de Geografia de Lisboa, no. 5 online)
- Hughes, A. and D. Perfect (2008) Historical Dictionary of the Gambia, 4th ed., Lanham, Maryland: Scarecrow.
- LeGrand, G. (1928) "La Gambie: notes historiques et géographiques" Bulletin du Comité d'études historiques et scientifiques de l'Afrique Occidentale Française, Jul-sep, p. 432-84
- Major, R.H. (1868) The Life of Prince Henry, surnamed the Navigator. London: Asher & Co. 1868 ed.
- Mauro, Alessandra (1988) "O "Carro do Austro" de Alvise da Ca' da Mosto: observaçoẽs astronómicas e fortuna editorial", Revista da Universidade de Coimbra, vol. 24, p. 463-75. offprint
- Michaud, Noah. (2024 [2023]) Re-Viewing Alvise Ca' da Mosto's Navigazioni in Early Modern Europe and Africa. Master's thesis, 2 eds. Gainesville, Fla: University of Florida. online
- Quintella, Ignacio da Costa (1839) Annaes da Marinha Portugueza, Lisbon: Academia Real das Sciencias, vol. 1.
- Russell, Peter E. (2000) Prince Henry 'the Navigator': a life. New Haven, Conn: Yale University Press.
- C. Schefer (1895) "Introduction" in Relation des voyages à la côte occidentale d'Afrique d'Alvise de Ca' da Mosto, 1455–1457, Paris: Leroux
- Teixera da Mota, Avelino (1946) "A descoberta da Guiné", Boletim cultural da Guiné Portuguesa, Vol. 1. Part 1 in No. 1 (Jan), p. 11–68, Pt. 2 in No. 2 (Apr), p. 273–326; Pt. 3 in No. 3 (Jul), p. 457–509.
- Teixira da Mota, A. (1972) Mar, além Mar: Estudos e ensaios de história e geographia. Lisbon: Junta de Investigações do Ultramar
- Verrier, F. (1994) "Introduction", in Voyages en Afrique Noire d'Alvise Ca'da Mosto (1455 & 1456). Paris: Chandeigne.
- Zurla, P. (1815) Dei viaggi e delle scoperte africane di Alvise da Cà da Mosto, Patrizio Veneto, Venice. online
- Wright, D. (1976), Niumi: the history of a western Mandinka state through the eighteenth century. Bloomington: Indiana University.
