= Cape Roxo =

Coordinates: 12°20′8″N 16°42′47″W

Cape Roxo (border of Senegal and Guinea-Bissau)

Cape Roxo (Portuguese: Cabo Roxo, French: Cap Roxo) is a headland in West Africa, marking the westernmost frontier of Guinea-Bissau with Senegal. On the lower side is the São Domingos district of the Cacheu Region of the Republic of Guinea-Bissau; above it is the Oussouye Department of the Ziguinchor Region of the Republic of Senegal.

Cape Roxo marks a significant angle shift in the outline of the African coast, with the coast running north–south above it, and turning southeast below it.

It was originally called Capo Rosso by Venetian explorer Alvise Cadamosto in 1456 on account of its reddish appearance (rosso = red in Italian). Although it is sometimes found translated as Cabo Vermelho in some old Portuguese maps, Cadamosto's Italian term was largely adopted as Cabo Roxo by most Portuguese cartographers (in Portuguese, roxo means 'purple', so it did not sound foreign.)

It should not be confused with Cape Rouge (or "Red Cape") further north, on the Petite Côte of Senegal.
