= Pedro de Sintra =

Portuguese explorer

Pedro de Sintra, also known as Pero de Sintra, Pedro da Cintra or Pedro da Sintra, was a Portuguese explorer. He was among the first Europeans to explore the West African coast. Around 1462 his expedition reached what is now Sierra Leone and named it. Although according to professor C. Magbaily Fyle this could have possibly been a misinterpretation of historians; there has been evidence of Serra Lyoa being mentioned prior to 1462, the year when de Sintra's expedition reached the coast of Sierra Leone. This would suggest that the person who named Sierra Leone is still unknown. However, if de Sintra did name the area, it is unclear whether he named it after the landforms or climate in the area. According to some the coastal regions resembled lion's teeth while others suggest the thunderstorms sounded like the roar of a lion. Sixteenth century English sailors called the area Sierra Leoa which later evolved to Sierra Leone in the 17th century. The British, prior to the area being colonised, officially adopted the name Sierra Leone in 1787.

De Sintra continued his journey from Sierra Leone to contemporary Liberia, and passed Cape Mount, Cape Corso (a.k.a. Cape Mesurado) and stopped at some forested hills, which he called Bosco de Santa Maria- probably contemporary 'Bassa Hills', where he turned since his interpreters could not understand the local language. De Sintra returned to Portugal in 1462 and one of his mariners, who had been on an earlier voyage of Alvise da Ca da Mosto, 1455 or 1456, gave the latter an account of this voyage, which Ca da Mosto published in Venice, after he left Portugal in 1463. Ca da Mosto's Navigazioni, were first published in Venice in the mid-1460s. Pero de Sintra's voyage is the first and only one commanded by the new king Alfons V - who, however, in 1468 negotiated a contract with the private merchant Fernao Gomes to fit out caravels for further exploration of the West African coast (1468-1474). João de Barros mentions that de Sintra captained an urca (hulk) during the 1481 expedition that was sent to build the feitoria of São Jorge da Mina.
