= Pre-Columbian transoceanic contact theories =

Speculative historical theories

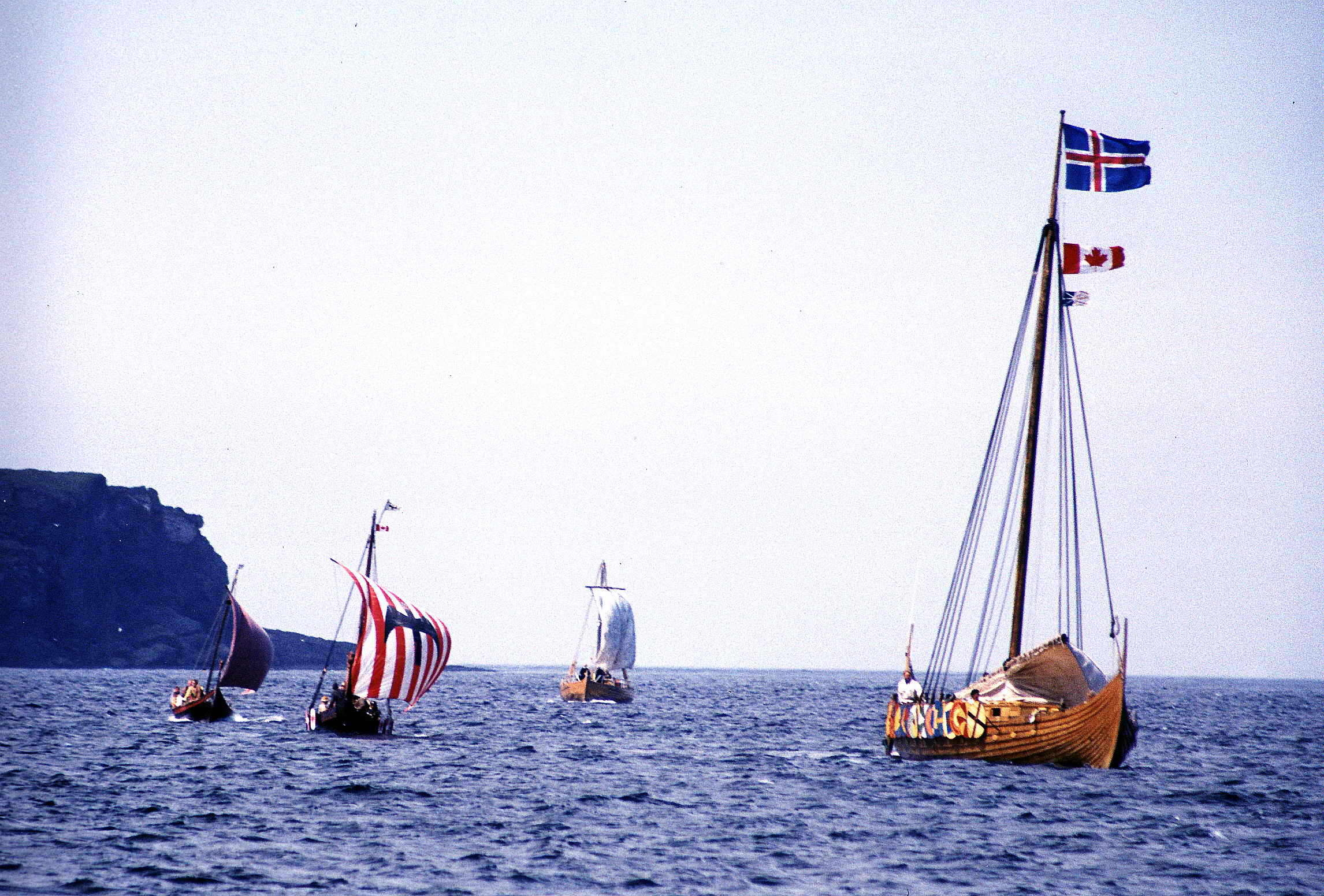
Reenactment of a Viking landing in L'Anse aux Meadows

Pre-Columbian transoceanic contact theories, many of which are speculative, propose that visits to the Americas, interactions with the Indigenous peoples of the Americas, or both, were made by people from elsewhere after the initial peopling of the Americas by migrants from Siberia across Beringia at least 15,000 years ago, but before Christopher Columbus's first voyage to the Caribbean in 1492.

Maritime explorations by Norse peoples from Scandinavia during the late 10th century led to the brief Norse colonization of Greenland and a base camp L'Anse aux Meadows in Newfoundland, which preceded Columbus's arrival in the Americas by some 500 years.

Recent genetic studies have also suggested that some eastern Polynesian populations have admixture from coastal western South American peoples, with an estimated date of contact around 1200 CE.

Scientific and scholarly responses to other claims of post-prehistory, pre-Columbian transoceanic contact have varied. Some of these claims are examined in reputable peer-reviewed sources. Many others are based only on circumstantial or ambiguous interpretations of archaeological evidence, the discovery of alleged out-of-place artifacts, superficial cultural comparisons, comments in historical documents, or narrative accounts. These have been dismissed as fringe science, pseudoarchaeology, or pseudohistory.

== Claims of Polynesian contact ==
=== Human genetics ===
Between 2007 and 2009, geneticist Erik Thorsby and colleagues published two studies in Tissue Antigens that offer evidence of an Amerindian genetic contribution to human populations on Easter Island, determining that it was probably introduced before European discovery of the island. In 2014, geneticist Anna-Sapfo Malaspinas of the Center for GeoGenetics at the University of Copenhagen published a study in Current Biology that found human genetic evidence of contact between the populations of Easter Island and South America, dating to approximately 600 years ago (i.e. 1400 CE ± 100 years). In 2017, a comprehensive genomes study found "no Native American admixture in pre- and post-European-contact individuals".

Two skulls suggested to belong to "Botocudo" people (a term used to refer to Native Americans who live in the interior of Brazil that speak Macro-Jê languages), were found in research published in 2013 to have been members of mtDNA haplogroup B4a1a1, which is normally found only among Polynesians and other subgroups of Austronesians. This was based on an analysis of 14 skulls. Two belonged to B4a1a1, while twelve belonged to subclades of mtDNA haplogroup C1 (common among Native Americans). The research team examined various scenarios, none of which they could say for certain were correct. They dismissed a scenario of direct contact in prehistory between Polynesia and Brazil as "too unlikely to be seriously entertained." While B4a1a1 is also found among the Malagasy people of Madagascar (which experienced significant Austronesian settlement in prehistory), the authors described as "fanciful" suggestions that B4a1a1 among the Botocudo resulted from the African slave trade (which included Madagascar). A later review paper of Polynesian history suggested that it was "more likely that these are the skulls of two people who died in Polynesia sometime early in the period of European voyaging, and whose graves were robbed by later visitors, and then mistakenly grouped in collections with the remains of Native Americans."

In 2020, a study in Nature found that populations in the Mangareva, Marquesas, and Palliser islands and Easter Island had genetic admixture from indigenous populations of South America, with the DNA of contemporary populations of Zenú people from the Pacific coast of Colombia being the closest match. The authors suggest that the genetic signatures were probably the result of a single ancient contact. They proposed that an initial admixture event between indigenous South Americans and Polynesians occurred in eastern Polynesia between 1150 and 1230 CE, with later admixture in Easter Island around 1380 CE, but suggested other possible contact scenarios—for example, Polynesian voyages to South America followed by Polynesian people's returning to Polynesia with South American people, or carrying South American genetic heritage. Several scholars uninvolved in the study suggested that a contact event in South America was more likely. Further genetic analysis on Easter Island indigenous population showed about 10% of the genome to be of Native American origin.

=== Plant genetics ===
The genetics of several plant species has also been used to support pre-Columbian contact via the Pacific. For example, there is a genetically distinct sub-population of coconuts on the western coast of South America. This has been suggested to be evidence of introduction by Austronesian seafarers.

=== Sweet potato ===
The spread of sweet potatoes. The red lines indicate the likely spread carried out by the Polynesians.

The sweet potato, a food crop native to the Americas, was widespread in Polynesia by the time European explorers first reached the Pacific. Sweet potato has been radiocarbon-dated to 1000 CE in the Cook Islands. Current thinking is that it was brought to central Polynesia c. 700 CE and spread across Polynesia from there. It has been suggested that it was brought by Polynesians who had traveled across the Pacific to South America and back, or that South Americans brought it to Polynesia. It is also possible that the plant floated across the ocean after being discarded from the cargo of a boat. According to the "tripartite hypothesis", phylogenetic analysis supports at least two separate introductions of sweet potatoes from South America into Polynesia, including one before and one after European contact.

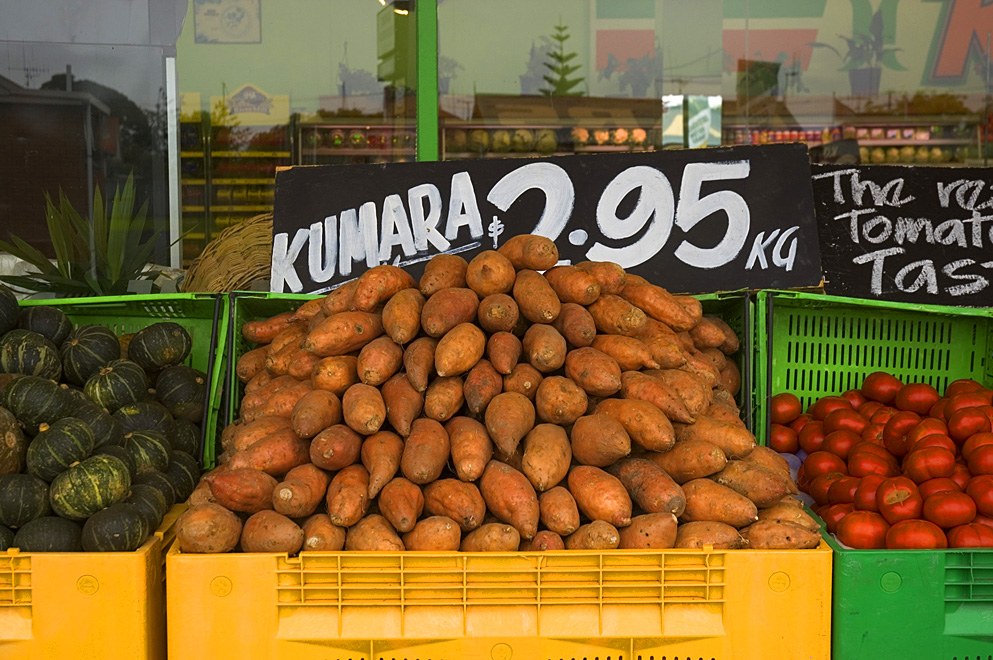
Sweet potatoes for sale, Thames, New Zealand. The word "kumara" has entered English from Māori and is widely used, especially in Polynesia.

Dutch linguists and specialists in Amerindian languages Willem Adelaar and Pieter Muysken have suggested that the word for sweet potato is shared by Polynesian languages and languages of South America. Proto-Polynesian *kumala (compare Easter Island kumara, Hawaiian ʻuala, Māori kūmara; even though a proto-form is reconstructed above, apparent cognates outside Eastern Polynesian are either definitely borrowed from Eastern Polynesian languages or irregular, calling Proto-Polynesian status and age into question) may be connected with dialectal Quechua and Aymara k'umar ~ k'umara; most Quechua dialects actually use apichu instead, but comal was attested at extinct Cañari language on the coast of what is now Ecuador in 1582.

Adelaar and Muysken assert that the similarity in the word for sweet potato "constitutes near proof of incidental contact between inhabitants of the Andean region and the South Pacific." The authors argue that the presence of the word for sweet potato suggests sporadic contact between Polynesia and South America, but not necessarily migrations.

=== Ageratum conyzoides ===
Ageratum conyzoides, also known as billygoat-weed, chick weed, goatweed, or whiteweed, is native to the tropical Americas, and was found in Hawaii by William Hillebrand in 1888 who considered it to have grown there before Captain Cook's arrival in 1778. A legitimate native name (meie parari or mei rore) and established native medicinal usage and use as a scent and in leis have been offered as support for the pre-Cookian age.

=== Turmeric ===
Turmeric (Curcuma longa) originated in Asia, and there is linguistic and circumstantial evidence of the spread and use of turmeric by the Austronesian peoples into Oceania and Madagascar. Günter Tessmann in 1930 (300 years after European contact) reported that a species of Curcuma was grown by the Amahuaca tribe to the east of the Upper Ucayali River in Peru and was a dye-plant used for the painting of the body, with the nearby Witoto people using it as face paint in their ceremonial dances. David Sopher noted in 1950 that "the evidence for a pre-European, transpacific introduction of the plant by man seems very strong indeed".

=== Physical anthropology ===
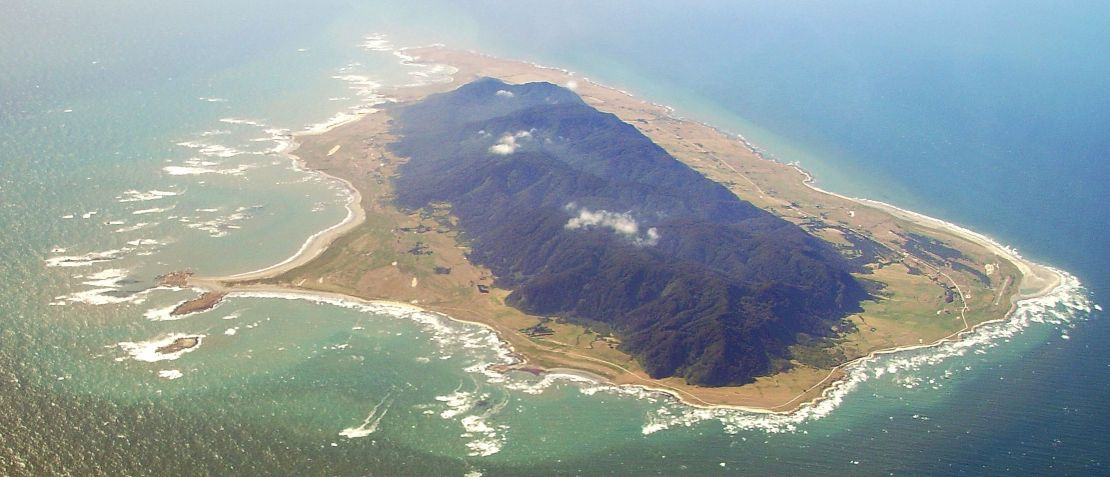
Mocha Island off the coast of the Arauco Peninsula, Chile

In December 2007, several human skulls were found in a museum in Concepción, Chile. These skulls originated on Mocha Island, an island which is located just off the coast of Chile on the Pacific Ocean, formerly inhabited by the Mapuche. Craniometric analysis of the skulls, according to Lisa Matisoo-Smith of the University of Otago and José Miguel Ramírez Aliaga of the Universidad de Valparaíso, suggests that the skulls have "Polynesian features" – such as a pentagonal shape when they are viewed from behind, and rocker jaws.

Rocker jaws have also been found at an excavation led José Miguel Ramírez in the coastal locality of Tunquén, Central Chile. The site of excavation corresponds to an area with pre-Hispanic tombs and shell middens (Spanish: conchal). A global review of rocker jaws among different populations show that while rocker jaws are not unique to Polynesians "[t]he rarity of rocker jaw in South American natives supports" the view of "Polynesian voyagers who ventured to the west coast of South America".

=== Disputed evidence ===
==== Araucanian chickens ====
In 2007, evidence emerged which suggested the possibility of pre-Columbian contact between the Mapuche people (Araucanians) of south-central Chile and Polynesians. Bones of Araucana chickens found at El Arenal site in the Arauco Peninsula, an area inhabited by Mapuche, support a pre-Columbian introduction of landraces from the South Pacific islands to South America. The bones found in Chile were radiocarbon-dated to between 1304 and 1424 CE, before the arrival of the Spanish. Chicken DNA sequences were matched to those of chickens in American Samoa and Tonga, and found to be dissimilar to those of European chickens.

However, this finding was challenged by a 2008 study which questioned its methodology and concluded that its conclusion is flawed, although the theory it posits may still be possible. Another study in 2014 reinforced that dismissal, and posited the crucial flaw in the initial research: "The analysis of ancient and modern specimens reveals a unique Polynesian genetic signature" and that "a previously reported connection between pre-European South America and Polynesian chickens most likely resulted from contamination with modern DNA, and that this issue is likely to confound ancient DNA studies involving haplogroup E chicken sequences."

However, in a 2013 study, the original authors extended and elaborated their findings, concluding:

This comprehensive approach demonstrates that the examination of modern chicken DNA sequences does not contribute to our understanding of the origins of Chile's earliest chickens. Interpretations based on poorly sourced and documented modern chicken populations, divorced from the archeological and historical evidence, do not withstand scrutiny. Instead, this expanded account will confirm the pre-Columbian age of the El Arenal remains and lend support to our original hypothesis that their appearance in South America is most likely due to Polynesian contact with the Americas in prehistory.

A 2019 study of South American chickens "revealed an unknown genetic component that is mostly present in the Easter Island population that is also present in local chicken populations from the South American Pacific fringe". The Easter Island chicken's "genetic proximity with the SA continental gamefowl can be explained by the fact that both populations were not crossed with cosmopolitan breeds and therefore remain closer to the ancestral population that originated them. " The genetic proximity might also "be indicative of a common origin of these two populations".

==== California canoes ====
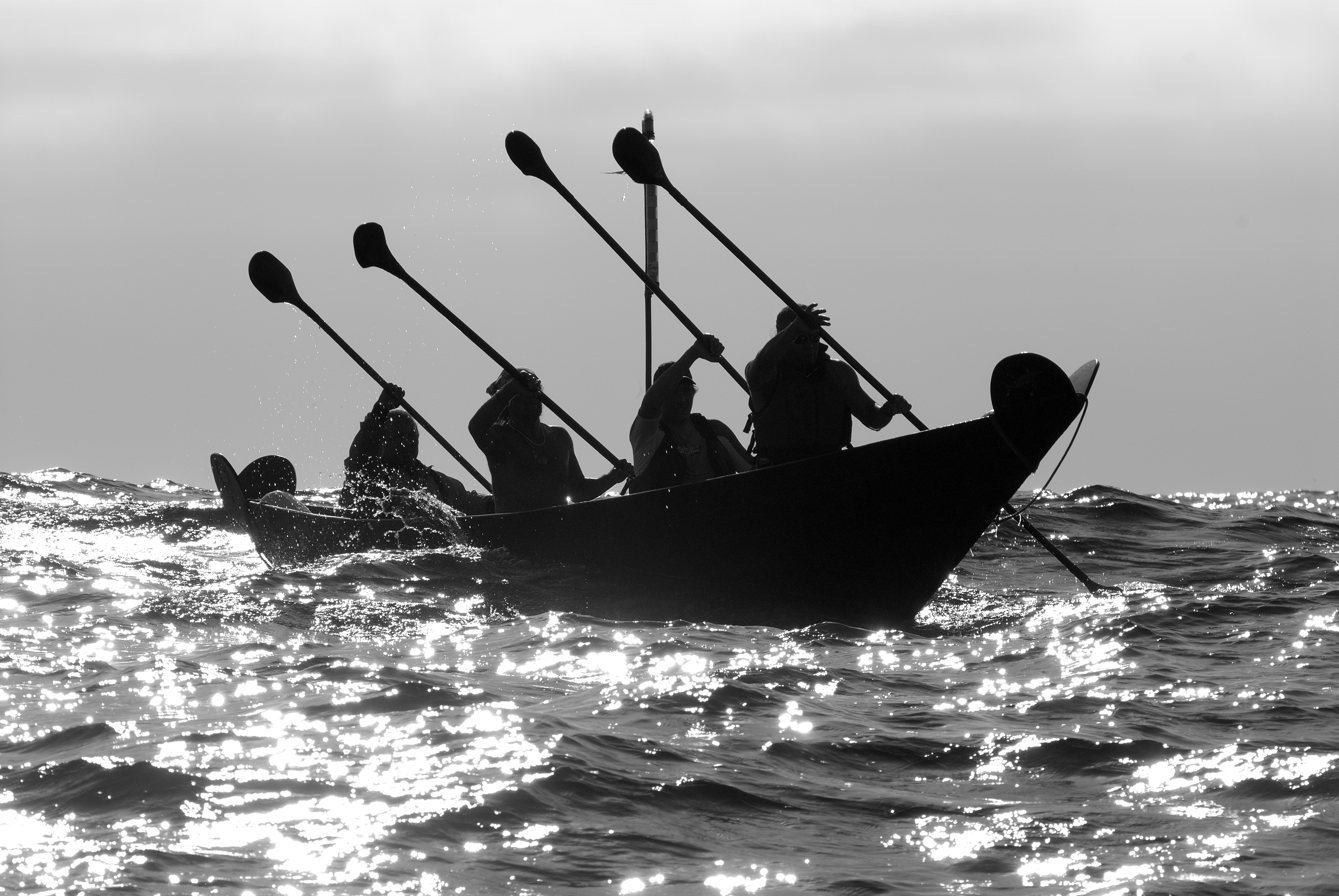
'Elye'wun, a reconstructed Chumash tomol

Researchers including Kathryn Klar and Terry Jones have proposed a theory of contact between Hawaiians and the Chumash people of Southern California between 400 and 800 CE. The sewn-plank canoes crafted by the Chumash and neighboring Tongva are unique among the indigenous peoples of North America, but similar in design to larger canoes used by Polynesians and Melanesians for deep-sea voyages. Tomolo'o, the Chumash word for such a craft, may derive from tumulaʻau/kumulaʻau, the Hawaiian term for the logs from which shipwrights carve planks to be sewn into canoes. The analogous Tongva term, tii'at, is unrelated. If it occurred, this contact left no genetic legacy in California or Hawaii. This theory has attracted limited media attention within California, but most archaeologists of the Tongva and Chumash cultures reject it on the grounds that the independent development of the sewn-plank canoe over several centuries is well-represented in the material record.

==== Clava hand-club and words for axes ====
Archaeological artefacts known as clava hand-clubs found in Araucanía and nearby areas of Argentina have a strong resemblance to the mere okewa found in New Zealand. The clava hand-clubs are also mentioned in the Spanish chronicles dating to the Conquest of Chile. According to Grete Mostny, clava hand-clubs "appear to have arrived to the west coast of South America from the Pacific". Polynesian clubs from Chatham Islands are reportedly the most similar to those of Chile. The clava hand-club is one of various Polynesian-like Mapuche artifacts known.

Possible linguistic evidence for Austronesian-American contact is found in words for axes. On Easter Island, the word for a stone axe is toki; among the New Zealand Maori, the word toki denotes an adze. Similar words are found in the Americas: In the Mapuche language of Chile and Argentina, the word for a stone axe is toki; and further afield in Colombia, the Yurumanguí word for an axe is totoki.

Stone adzes often had ceremonial value and were worn by Maori chiefs. The Mapuche word toki may also mean "chief" and thus may be related to the Quechua word toqe ("militia chief") and the Aymara word toqueni ("person of great judgement"). In the view of Moulian et al. (2015) the possible South American links complicate matters regarding the meaning of the word toki because they are suggestive of Polynesian contact.

== Population Y ==
A 2015 study found some Indigenous American groups, particularly those in the Amazon, carry a small admixture (around 1-2% of the genome) related to groups in Southeast Asia and Australasia like Andamanese peoples, Indigenous Australians, Papuans and the Mamanwa people of the Philippines. This ancestry component has been dubbed "Population Y". Some authors have suggested that this reflects a trans-Pacific migration, but scholars have suggested that this more likely reflects genetic heterogeneity in the initial founding population of Native Americans present in Beringia, only some of which carried the "Population Y" ancestry. It has also been noted that a 40,000 year old individual from Tianyuan Cave in northern China also carries this ancestry, making it more likely that this ancestry was the result of contact in Eurasia, prior to the arrival of the ancestors of Native Americans in Beringia.

== Claims of East Asian contact ==
=== Claims of contact with Ecuador ===
A 2013 genetic study suggested the possibility of contact between Ecuador and East Asia, that would have happened no earlier than 6,000 years ago (4000 BCE) via either a trans-oceanic or a late-stage coastal migration that did not leave genetic imprints in North America. Further research did not support this but was rather "a case of a rare founding lineage that has been lost elsewhere by drift."

=== Claims of Chinese contact ===
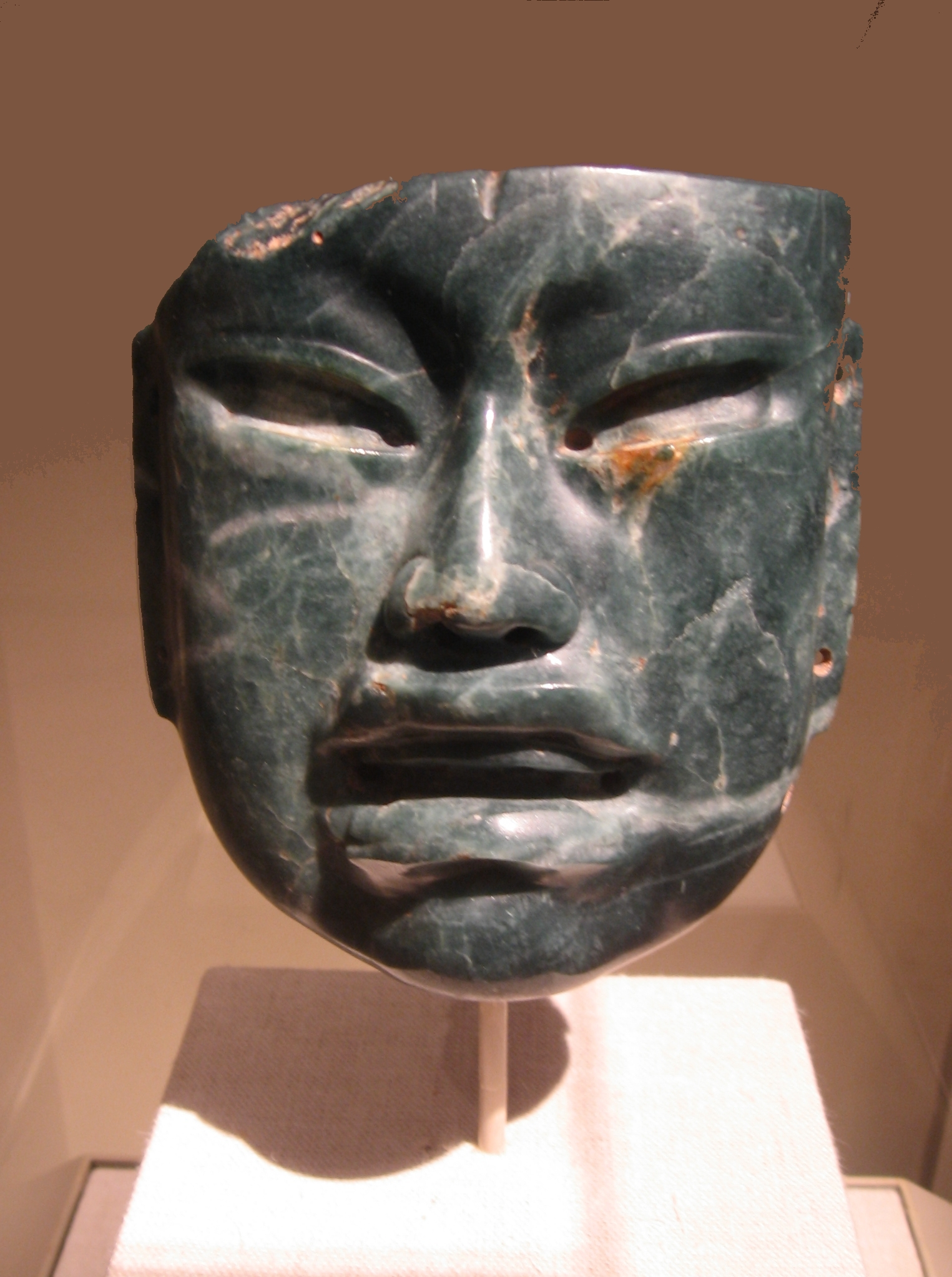
A jade Olmec mask from Central America. Gordon Ekholm, an archaeologist and curator at the American Museum of Natural History, suggested that the Olmec art style might have originated in Bronze Age China.

Some researchers have argued that the Olmec civilization came into existence with the help of Chinese refugees, particularly at the end of the Shang dynasty. In 1975, Betty Meggers of the Smithsonian Institution argued that the Olmec civilization originated around 1200 BCE due to Shang Chinese influences. In a 1996 book, Mike Xu, with the aid of Chen Hanping, claimed that celts from La Venta bear Chinese characters. These claims are unsupported by mainstream Mesoamerican researchers.

Other claims of early Chinese contact with North America have been made. In 1882, approximately 30 brass coins, perhaps strung together, were reportedly found in the area of the Cassiar Gold Rush, apparently near Dease Creek, an area which was dominated by Chinese gold miners. A contemporary account states:

In the summer of 1882 a miner found on De Foe (Deorse?) creek, Cassiar district, Br. Columbia, thirty Chinese coins in the auriferous sand, twenty-five feet below the surface. They appeared to have been strung, but on taking them up the miner let them drop apart. The earth above and around them was as compact as any in the neighborhood. One of these coins I examined at the store of Chu Chong in Victoria. Neither in metal nor markings did it resemble the modern coins, but in its figures looked more like an Aztec calendar. So far as I can make out the markings, this is a Chinese chronological cycle of sixty years, invented by Emperor Huungti, 2637 BCE, and circulated in this form to make his people remember it.

Grant Keddie, curator of archeology at the Royal B.C. Museum, identified these as good luck temple tokens which were minted in the 19th century. He believed that claims that these were very old made them notorious and he wrote that "The temple coins were shown to many people and different versions of stories pertaining to their discovery and age spread around the province to be put into print and changed frequently by many authors in the last 100 years."

A group of Chinese Buddhist missionaries led by Hui Shen before 500 CE claimed to have visited a location called Fusang. Although Chinese mapmakers placed this territory on the Asian coast, others have suggested as early as the 1800s that Fusang might have been in North America, due to perceived similarities between portions of the California coast and Fusang as depicted by Asian sources.

In his debunked pseudohistorical book 1421: The Year China Discovered the World, British author Gavin Menzies claimed that the treasure fleets of Ming admiral Zheng He arrived in America in 1421. The consensus among professional historians is that Zheng He only reached the eastern coast of Africa, and they dismiss Menzies's claims as entirely without evidence.

In 1973 and 1975, doughnut-shaped stones that resembled stone anchors which were used by Chinese fishermen were discovered off the coast of California. These stones (sometimes called the Palos Verdes stones) were initially thought to be up to 1,500 years old and therefore, they were thought to be proof of pre-Columbian contact by Chinese sailors. Later geological investigations showed that they were made of a local rock which is known as Monterey shale, and it is currently believed that they were used by Chinese settlers who fished off the coast during the 19th century.

=== Claims of Japanese contact ===
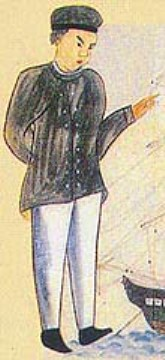
Otokichi, a Japanese castaway in America in 1834, depicted here in 1849

Archaeologist Emilio Estrada and co-workers wrote that pottery which was associated with the Valdivia culture of coastal Ecuador and dated to 3000–1500 BCE exhibited similarities to pottery which was produced during the Jōmon period in Japan, arguing that contact between the two cultures might explain the similarities. Chronological and other problems have led most archaeologists to dismiss this idea as implausible. The suggestion has been made that the resemblances (which are not complete) are simply due to the limited number of designs possible when incising clay.

Alaskan anthropologist Nancy Yaw Davis claims that the Zuni people of New Mexico exhibit linguistic and cultural similarities to the Japanese. The Zuni language is a linguistic isolate, and Davis contends that the culture appears to differ from that of the surrounding natives in terms of blood type, endemic disease, and religion. Davis speculates that Buddhist priests or restless peasants from Japan may have crossed the Pacific in the 13th century, traveled to the American Southwest, and influenced Zuni society.

In the 1890s, lawyer and politician James Wickersham argued that pre-Columbian contact between Japanese sailors and Native Americans was highly probable, given that from the early 17th century to the mid-19th century several dozen Japanese ships are known to have been carried from Asia to North America along the powerful Kuroshio Currents. Japanese ships landed at places between the Aleutian Islands in the north and Mexico in the south, carrying a total of 293 people in the 23 cases where head-counts were given in historical records. In most cases, the Japanese sailors gradually made their way home on merchant vessels. In 1834, a dismasted, rudderless Japanese ship was wrecked near Cape Flattery in the Pacific Northwest. Three survivors of the ship were enslaved by Makahs for a period before being rescued by members of the Hudson's Bay Company. Another Japanese ship went ashore in about 1850 near the mouth of the Columbia River, Wickersham writes, and the sailors were assimilated into the local Native American population. While admitting there is no definitive proof of pre-Columbian contact between Japanese and North Americans, Wickersham thought it implausible that such contacts as outlined above would have started only after Europeans arrived in North America and began documenting them.

== Claims of Indian contact ==
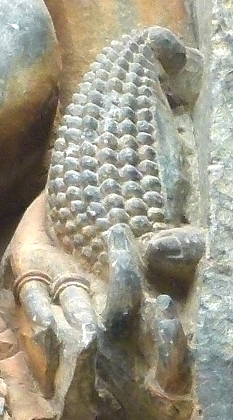
Maize-like object held by sculpture at the 1160 A.D. Halebid Hoysaleswara Temple

In 1879, Alexander Cunningham wrote a description of the carvings on the Stupa of Bharhut in central India, dating from c. 200 BCE, among which he noted what appeared to be a depiction of a custard-apple (Annona squamosa). Cunningham was not initially aware that this plant, indigenous to the New World tropics, was introduced to India after Vasco da Gama's discovery of the sea route in 1498, and the problem was pointed out to him. A 2009 study claimed to have found carbonized remains that date to 2000 BCE and appear to be those of custard-apple seeds.

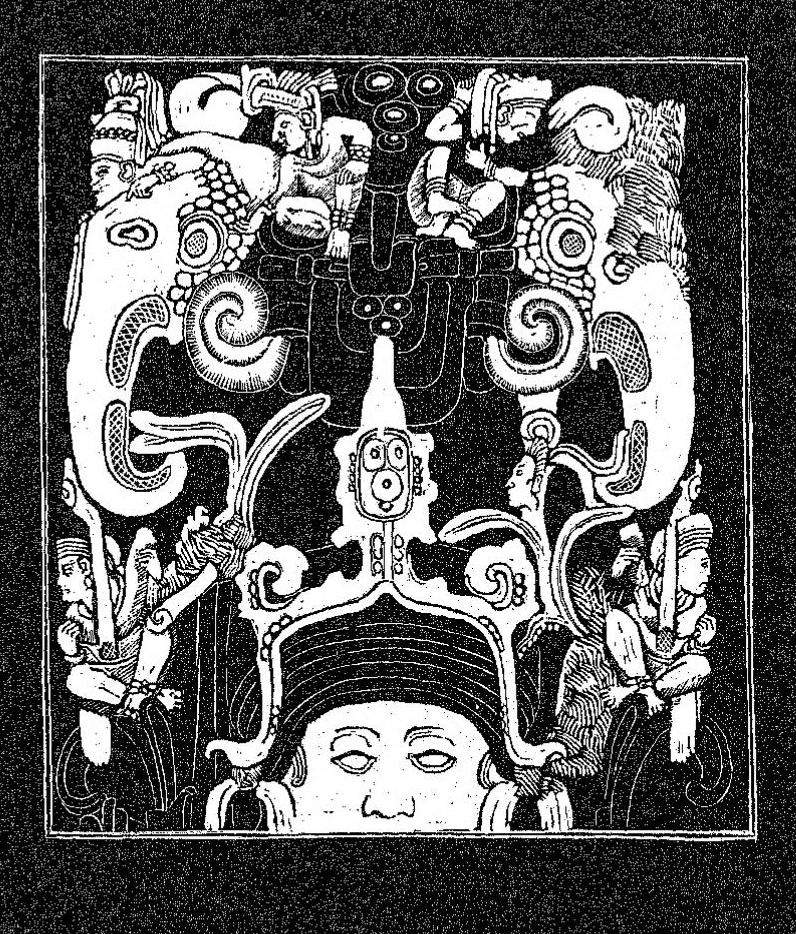
Copán stela B was claimed by Smith as representing elephants

Grafton Elliot Smith claimed that certain motifs present in the carvings on the Mayan stelae at Copán represented the Asian elephant, and wrote a book on the topic entitled Elephants and Ethnologists in 1924. Contemporary archaeologists suggested that the depictions were almost certainly based on the (indigenous) tapir, with the result that Smith's suggestions have generally been dismissed by subsequent research.

Some objects depicted in carvings from Karnataka, dating from the 12th century, that resemble ears of maize (Zea mays—a crop native to the New World), were interpreted by Carl Johannessen and Ann Parker in 1989 as evidence of pre-Columbian contact. These suggestions were dismissed by multiple Indian researchers based on several lines of evidence. The object has been claimed by some to instead represent a "Muktaphala", an imaginary fruit bedecked with pearls.

Ethnobotanist and Indologist Shakti M. Gupta concurs with Johannessen and Parker that the objects in question are maize ears:

Different varieties of the corn cob [Zea mays Linn.] are extensively sculpted [...] on the Hindu and Jain temples of Karnataka. [...] The straight rows of the corn grains can easily be identified. [...] Temples where the corn cobs are found are dated 12-13th century A.D. [...] By the time these temples were constructed, maize would have been fairly common in India.

Gupta also identifies custard apple, sunflower, pineapple, cashew, and monstera, all New World plants, in Indian temple art.

== Claims of African and West Asian contact ==
=== Claims of African contact ===
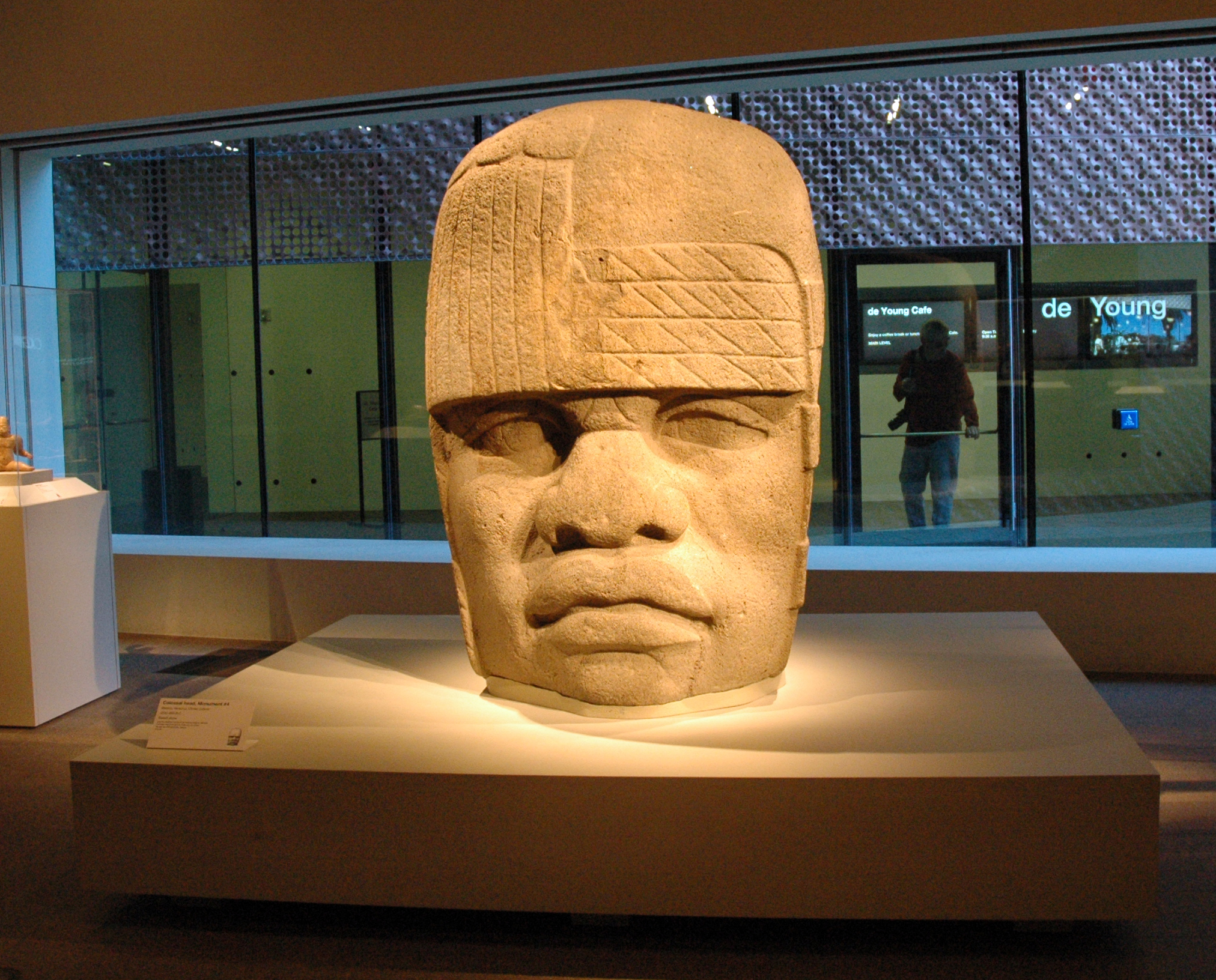
Several Olmec colossal heads have features that some diffusionists link to African contact

Proposed claims for an African presence in Mesoamerica stem from attributes of the Olmec culture, the claimed transfer of African plants to the Americas, and interpretations of European and Arabic historical accounts.

In 1922, Leo Wiener attested in Africa and the Discovery of America that there are similarities between the Mandinka people of West Africa and native Mesoamerican religious symbols such as the winged serpent and the sun disk, or Quetzalcoatl, and words that have Mandé roots and share similar meanings across both cultures, such as "kore", "gadwal", and "qubila" (in Arabic) or "kofila" (in Mandinka).

The Olmec culture existed in what is now southern Mexico from roughly 1200 BCE to 400 BCE. The idea that the Olmecs are related to Africans was first suggested by José Melgar, who discovered the first colossal head at Hueyapan (now Tres Zapotes) in 1862. More recently, Ivan Van Sertima speculated an African influence on Mesoamerican culture in his book They Came Before Columbus (1976). His claims included the attribution of Mesoamerican pyramids, calendar technology, mummification, and mythology to the arrival of Africans by boat on currents running from Western Africa to the Americas. Heavily inspired by Leo Wiener (see above), Van Sertima suggested that the Aztec god Quetzalcoatl represented an African visitor. His conclusions have been severely criticized by mainstream academics and considered pseudoarchaeology.

Malian sources describe what some consider to be visits to the New World by a fleet from the Mali Empire in 1311, led by Mansa Muhammad. According to the only known primary-source-based copy of Christopher Columbus's journal (transcribed by Bartolomé de las Casas), the purpose of Columbus's third voyage was to test both (1) the claims of King John II of Portugal that "canoes had been found which set out from the coast of Guinea [West Africa] and sailed to the west with merchandise" and (2) the claims of the native inhabitants of the Caribbean island of Hispaniola that "there had come to Española from the south and south-east, a black people who have the tops of their spears made of a metal which they call guanin, of which he had sent samples to the Sovereigns to have them assayed, when it was found that of 32 parts, 18 were of gold, 6 of silver and 8 of copper".

Brazilian researcher Niede Guidon, who led the excavations of the Pedra Furada sites, "said she believed that humans...might have come not overland from Asia but by boat from Africa", with the journey taking place 100,000 years ago, well before the accepted dates for the earliest human migrations that led to the prehistoric settlement of the Americas. Michael R. Waters, a geoarchaeologist at Texas A&M University, noted the absence of genetic evidence in modern populations to support Guidon's claim.

=== Claims of Arab contact ===
Early Chinese accounts of Muslim expeditions state that Muslim sailors reached a region called Mulan Pi ("magnolia skin") (Chinese: 木蘭皮; pinyin: Mùlán Pí; Wade–Giles: Mu-lan-p'i). Mulan Pi is mentioned in Lingwai Daida (1178) by Zhou Qufei and Zhufan Zhi (1225) by Chao Jukua, together referred to as the "Sung Document". Mulan Pi is normally identified as Spain and Morocco of the Almoravid dynasty (Al-Murabitun), though some fringe theories hold that it is instead some part of the Americas.

One supporter of the interpretation of Mulan Pi as part of the Americas was historian Hui-lin Li in 1961, and while Joseph Needham was also open to the possibility, he doubted that Arab ships at the time would have been able to withstand a return journey over such a long distance across the Atlantic Ocean, pointing out that a return journey would have been impossible without knowledge of prevailing winds and currents.

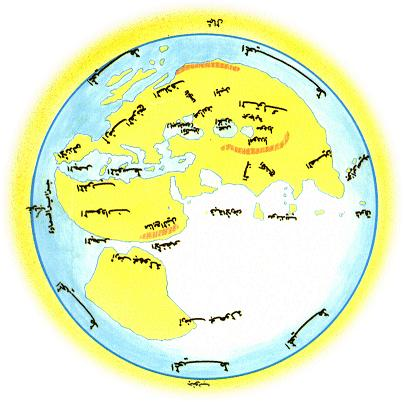
Al-Mas'udi's atlas of the world includes a continent west (or south) of the Old World

According to Muslim historian Abu al-Hasan Ali al-Mas'udi (871–957), Khashkhash Ibn Saeed Ibn Aswad sailed over the Atlantic Ocean and discovered a previously unknown land (Arḍ Majhūlah, Arabic: أرض مجهولة) in 889 and returned with a shipload of valuable treasures. The passage has been alternatively interpreted to imply that Ali al-Masudi regarded the story of Khashkhash to be a fanciful tale.

Professor Fuat Sezgin authored a paper titled "The Pre-Columbian Discovery of the American Continent by Muslim Sea-Farers". In it, he examines several maps and travel accounts, and concludes that it is quite possible that Muslim sailors reached the eastern shores of South America.

=== Claims of ancient Phoenician contact ===
In 1996, Mark McMenamin proposed that Phoenician sailors discovered the New World c. 350 BC. The Phoenician state of Carthage minted gold staters in 350 BC bearing a pattern in the reverse exergue of the coins, which McMenamin initially interpreted as a map of the Mediterranean with the Americas shown to the west across the Atlantic. McMenamin later demonstrated that these coins found in America were modern forgeries.

=== Claims of ancient Judaic contact ===
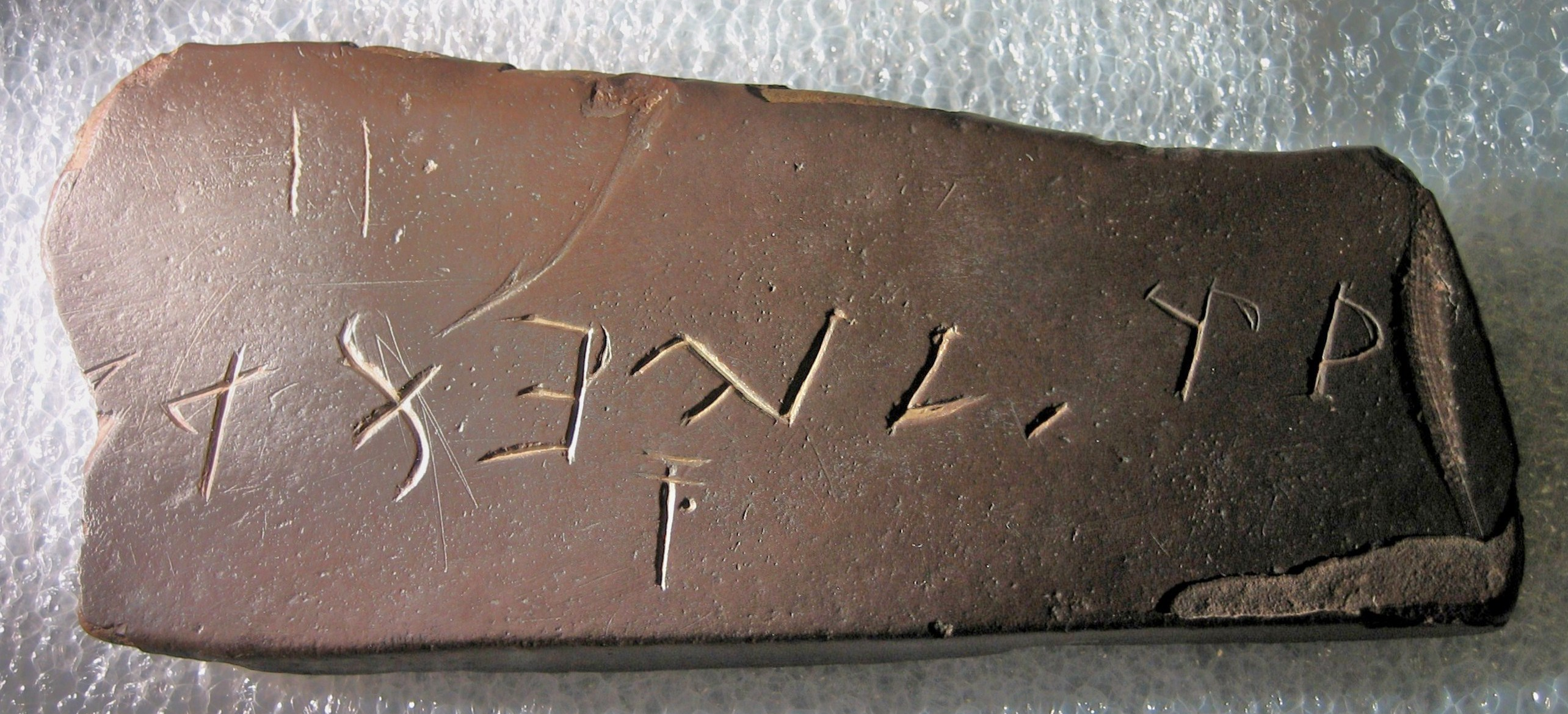
The Bat Creek inscription

The Bat Creek inscription and Los Lunas Decalogue Stone have led some to suggest the possibility that Jewish seafarers may have traveled to America after they fled from the Roman Empire at the time of the Jewish–Roman Wars in the 1st and 2nd centuries CE.

However, American archaeologists Robert C. Mainfort Jr. and Mary L. Kwas argued in American Antiquity (2004) that the Bat Creek inscription was copied from an illustration in an 1870 Masonic reference book and introduced by the Smithsonian field assistant who found it during excavation activities.

As for the Decalogue Stone, there are mistakes which suggest that it was carved by one or more novices who either overlooked or misunderstood some details on a source Decalogue from which they copied it. Since there is no other evidence or archaeological context in the vicinity, it is most likely that the legend at the nearby university is true—that the stone was carved by two anthropology students whose signatures can be seen inscribed in the rock below the Decalogue, "Eva and Hobe 3-13-30."

Scholar Cyrus H. Gordon believed that Phoenicians and other Semitic-speaking groups had crossed the Atlantic in antiquity, ultimately arriving in both North and South America. This opinion was based on his own work on the Bat Creek inscription. Similar ideas were also held by John Philip Cohane; Cohane even claimed that many geographical placenames in the United States have a Semitic origin.

== Claims of European contact ==
=== Solutrean hypothesis ===
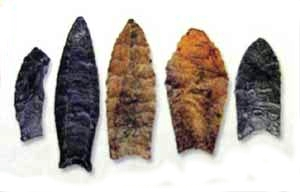
Examples of Clovis and other Paleoindian point forms, markers of archaeological cultures in northeastern North America

The Solutrean hypothesis argues that Europeans migrated to the New World during the Paleolithic era, circa 16,000 to 13,000 BCE. This hypothesis proposes contact partly on the basis of perceived similarities between the flint tools of the Solutrean culture in modern-day France, Spain, and Portugal (which thrived circa 20,000 to 15,000 BCE), and the Clovis culture of North America, which developed circa 9,000 BCE. The Solutrean hypothesis was proposed in the mid-1990s. It has little support amongst the scientific community, and genetic markers are inconsistent with the idea.

=== Claims of contact in antiquity ===
Claims have been made for contact in Classical Antiquity, primarily with the Roman Empire, but sometimes also with other contemporaneous cultures. Lucio Russo proposed that the classical idea of the inhabited world, from the Isles of the Blessed to the capital of the Seres, spanning 180° of longitude was based on the Isles of the Blessed being the Lesser Antilles.

Claims of contacts with the civilizations of antiquity have been based on isolated archaeological finds in American sites that originated in the Old World. For example, the Bay of Jars in Brazil has been yielding ancient clay storage jars that resemble Roman amphorae for over 150 years. It has been proposed that the origin of these jars is a Roman shipwreck, although it has also been suggested that they could be 15th- or 16th-century Spanish olive oil jars.

Archaeologist Romeo Hristov argues that a Roman ship, or the drifting of such a shipwreck to American shores, is a possible explanation for the alleged discovery of artifacts that are apparently ancient Roman in origin (such as the Tecaxic-Calixtlahuaca bearded head) in America. Hristov claims that the possibility of such an event has been made more likely by the discovery of evidence of travels by Romans to Tenerife and Lanzarote in the Canary Islands, and of a Roman settlement (from the 1st century BCE to the 4th century CE) on Lanzarote.

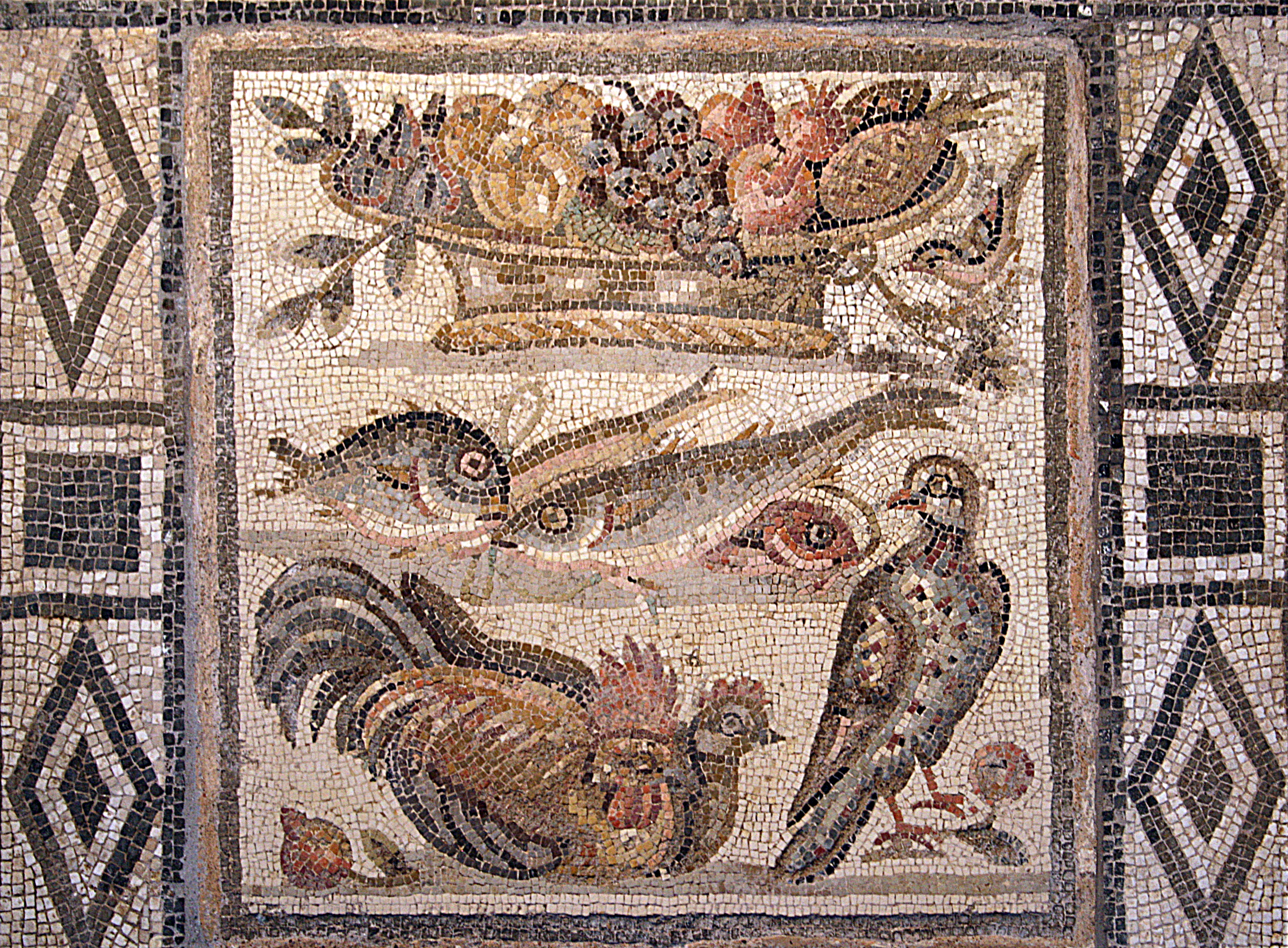
Floor mosaic depicting a fruit which looks like a pineapple. Opus vermiculatum, Roman artwork of the end of the 1st century BCE/beginning of the 1st century CE.

In 1950, an Italian botanist, Domenico Casella, suggested that a depiction of a pineapple (a fruit native to the New World tropics) was represented among wall paintings of Mediterranean fruits at Pompeii. According to Wilhelmina Feemster Jashemski, this interpretation has been challenged by other botanists, who identify it as a pine cone from the umbrella pine tree, which is native to the Mediterranean area. The leaves shown in the depiction (as with stone carvings from Nineveh) make the pine cone identification problematic.

Roman and other European coins have been found in the United States. Jeremiah Epstein, an American anthropologist, rejected the suggestion that these coins can be cited as evidence of Pre-Columbian contact between Europe and the Americas, pointing out the lack of any pre-Columbian archaeological contexts relating to these finds, the lack of detail concerning the discoveries, and the possibility of forgery (at least two were clearly forgeries).

A possible explanation for many of the ancient European coins found in the Americas is that they were carried over by modern ships, mixed in with solid ballast. Ships leaving European harbors would often take aboard sand and gravel dug from the shoreline in order to add weight and stability in the absence of cargo. Upon arrival at New World ports, these ships would dump the ballast and load up on trade goods. It is likely that this ballast, dug from the shores of ancient centers of commerce, contained small artifacts such as coins.

==== Tecaxic-Calixtlahuaca head ====
A small terracotta sculpture of a head, with a beard and European-like features, was found in 1933 in the Toluca Valley, 72 kilometres (45 mi) southwest of Mexico City, in a burial offering under three intact floors of a pre-colonial building dated to between 1476 and 1510. The artifact has been studied by Roman art authority Bernard Andreae, director emeritus of the German Institute of Archaeology in Rome, Italy, and Austrian anthropologist Robert von Heine-Geldern, both of whom stated that the style of the artifact was compatible with small Roman sculptures of the 2nd century. If genuine and if not placed there after 1492 (the pottery found with it dates to between 1476 and 1510), the find provides evidence for at least a one-time contact between the Old and New Worlds.

According to Arizona State University's Michael E. Smith, a leading Mesoamerican scholar named John Paddock used to tell his classes in the years before he died that the artifact was planted as a joke by Hugo Moedano, a student who originally worked on the site. Despite speaking with individuals who knew the original discoverer (García Payón), and Moedano, Smith says he has been unable to confirm or reject this claim. Though he remains skeptical, Smith concedes he cannot rule out the possibility that the head was a genuinely buried post-Classic offering at Calixtlahuaca.

=== 14th- and 15th-century European contact ===
Henry I Sinclair, Earl of Orkney and feudal baron of Roslin (c. 1345 – c. 1400), was a Scottish nobleman who is best known today from a modern legend which claims that he took part in explorations of Greenland and North America almost 100 years before Christopher Columbus's voyages to the Americas. In 1784, he was identified by Johann Reinhold Forster as possibly being the Prince Zichmni who is described in letters which were allegedly written around 1400 by the Zeno brothers of Venice, in which they describe a voyage which they made throughout the North Atlantic under the command of Zichmni. According to The Dictionary of Canadian Biography Online, "the Zeno affair remains one of the most preposterous and at the same time one of the most successful fabrications in the history of exploration."

Henry was the grandfather of William Sinclair, 1st Earl of Caithness, the builder of Rosslyn Chapel near Edinburgh, Scotland. The authors Robert Lomas and Christopher Knight believe some carvings in the chapel were intended to represent ears of New World corn or maize, a crop unknown in Europe at the time of the chapel's construction. Knight and Lomas view these carvings as evidence supporting the idea that Henry Sinclair traveled to the Americas well before Columbus. In their book, they discuss meeting with the wife of the botanist Adrian Dyer and state that Dyer's wife told them that Dyer agreed that the image thought to be maize was accurate. In fact, Dyer found only one identifiable plant among the botanical carvings and instead suggested that the "maize" and "aloe" were stylized wooden patterns, only coincidentally looking like real plants. Specialists in medieval architecture have variously interpreted the carvings as stylised depictions of wheat, strawberries, or lilies.

Henry Yule Oldham suggested that the Bianco world map depicted part of the coast of Brazil before 1448. This was immediately opposed by members of the Royal Geographical Society but later repeated by American and European historians. This was later refuted by Abel Fontoura da Costa, who proved that it actually depicted Santiago, the largest island of the Cape Verde archipelago.

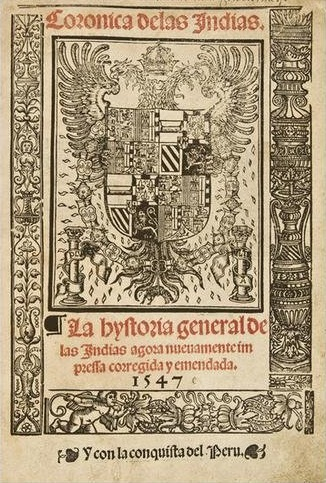
A 1547 edition of Oviedo's La historia general de las Indias

Some have conjectured that Columbus was able to persuade the Catholic Monarchs of Castile and Aragon to support his planned voyage only because they were aware of some recent earlier voyage across the Atlantic. Some suggest that Columbus himself visited Canada or Greenland before 1492, because, according to Bartolomé de las Casas, he wrote he had sailed 100 leagues past an island that he called Thule in 1477. Whether Columbus actually did this and what island he visited, if any, is uncertain. Columbus is thought to have visited Bristol in 1476. Bristol was also the port from which John Cabot sailed in 1497, crewed mostly by Bristol sailors. In a letter of late 1497 or early 1498, the English merchant John Day wrote to Columbus about Cabot's discoveries, saying that land found by Cabot was "discovered in the past by the men from Bristol who found 'Brasil' as your lordship knows". There may be records of expeditions from Bristol to find the "isle of Brazil" in 1480 and 1481. Trade between Bristol and Iceland is well documented from the mid-15th century.

Gonzalo Fernández de Oviedo y Valdés records several such legends in his Historia general de las Indias of 1526, which includes biographical information on Columbus. He discusses the then-current story of a Spanish caravel that was swept off its course while on its way to England, and wound up in a foreign land populated by naked tribesmen. The crew gathered supplies and made its way back to Europe, but the trip took several months and the captain and most of the men died before reaching land. The caravel's ship pilot, a man called Alonso Sánchez, and a few others made it to Portugal, but all were very ill. Columbus was a good friend of the pilot, and took him to be treated in his own house, and the pilot described the land they had seen and marked it on a map before dying. People in Oviedo's time knew this story in several versions, though Oviedo himself regarded it as a myth.

In 1925, Soren Larsen wrote a book claiming that a joint Danish-Portuguese expedition landed in Newfoundland or Labrador in 1473 and again in 1476. Larsen claimed that Didrik Pining and Hans Pothorst served as captains, while João Vaz Corte-Real and the possibly mythical John Scolvus served as navigators, accompanied by Álvaro Martins. Nothing beyond circumstantial evidence has been found to support Larsen's claims.

The historical record shows that Basque fishermen were present in Newfoundland and Labrador from at least 1517 onward (therefore predating all recorded European settlements in the region except those of the Norse). The Basques' fishing expeditions led to significant trade and cultural exchanges with Native Americans. A fringe theory suggests that Basque sailors first arrived in North America prior to Columbus' voyages to the New World (some sources suggest the late 14th century as a tentative date) but kept the destination a secret in order to avoid competition over the fishing resources of the North American coasts. There is no historical or archaeological evidence to support this claim.

=== Irish and Welsh legends ===
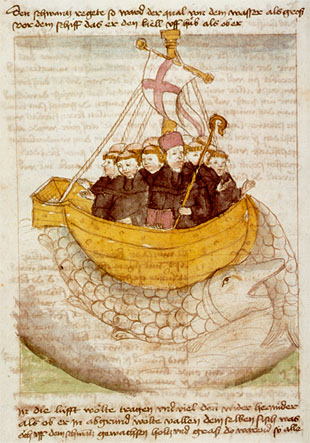
Saint Brendan and the whale, from a 15th-century manuscript

The legend of Saint Brendan, an Irish monk from what is now County Kerry, involves a fantastical journey into the Atlantic Ocean in search of Paradise in the 6th century. Since the discovery of the New World, various authors have tried to link the Brendan legend with an early discovery of America. In 1977, the voyage was successfully recreated by Tim Severin using a replica of an ancient Irish currach.

According to a British myth, Madoc was a prince from Wales who explored the Americas as early as 1170. While most scholars consider this legend to be untrue, it was used to bolster British claims in the Americas vis-à-vis those of Spain. The "Madoc story" remained popular in later centuries, and a later development asserted that Madoc's voyagers had intermarried with local Native Americans, and that their Welsh-speaking descendants still live somewhere in the United States. These "Welsh Indians" were credited with the construction of a number of landmarks throughout the Midwestern United States, and a number of white travelers were inspired to go look for them. The "Madoc story" has been the subject of much speculation in the context of possible pre-Columbian trans-oceanic contact. No conclusive archaeological proof of such a man or his voyages has been found in the New or Old World; however, speculation abounds connecting him with certain sites, such as Devil's Backbone, located on the Ohio River at Fourteen Mile Creek near Louisville, Kentucky.

At Fort Mountain State Park in Georgia, a plaque formerly mentioned a 19th-century interpretation of the ancient stone wall that gives the site its name. The plaque repeated a claim by Tennessee governor John Sevier that Cherokees believed "a people called Welsh" had built a fort on the mountain long ago to repel Indian attacks. The plaque has been changed, leaving no reference to Madoc or the Welsh.

Biologist and controversial amateur epigrapher Barry Fell claims that Irish Ogham writing has been found carved into stones in the Virginias. Linguist David H. Kelley has criticized some of Fell's work but nonetheless argued that genuine Celtic Ogham inscriptions have in fact been discovered in America. However, others have raised serious doubts about these claims.

== Claims of transoceanic travel originating in the New World ==
=== Claims of Egyptian coca and tobacco ===
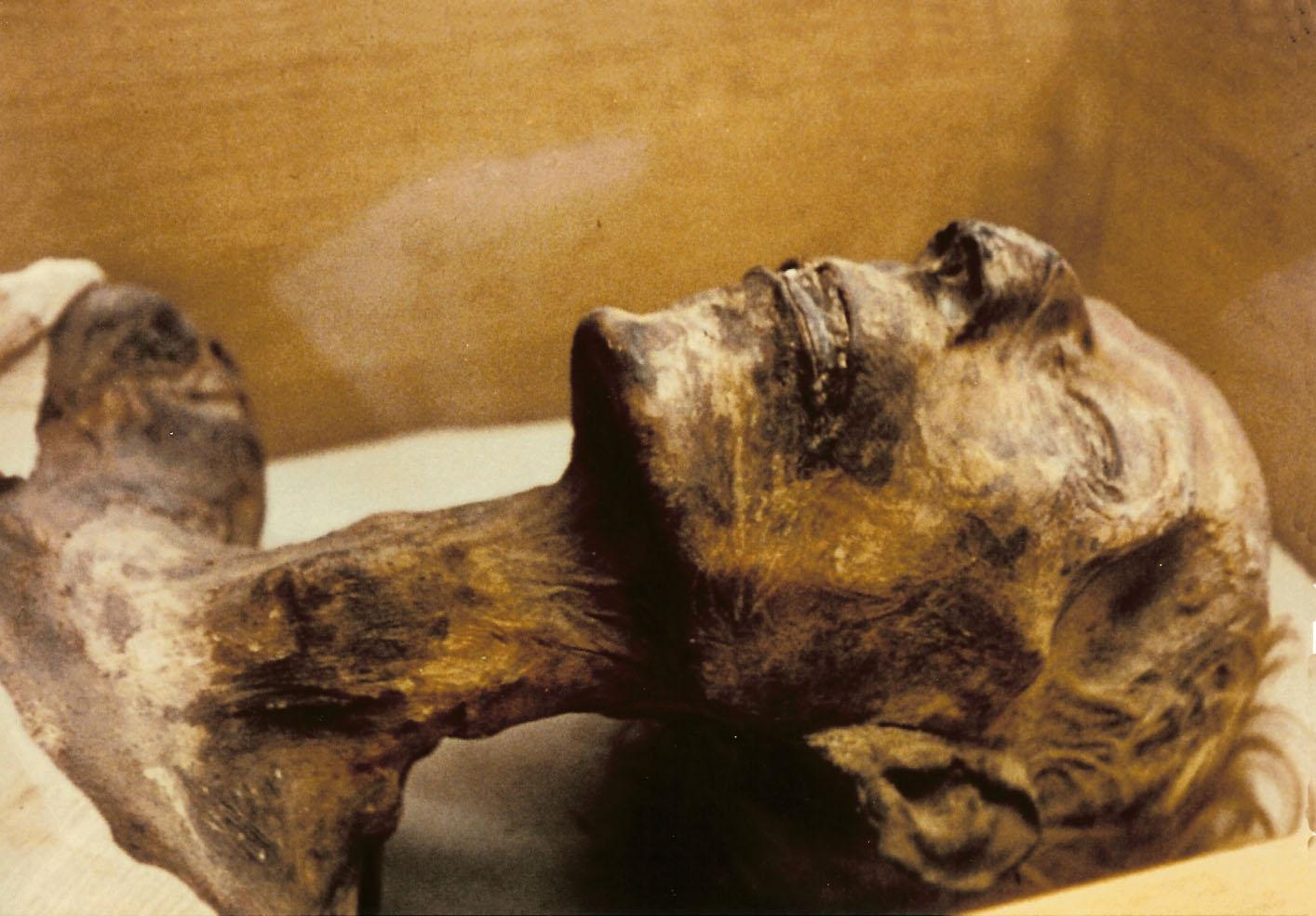
The mummy of Ramesses II

Traces of coca and nicotine which are found in some Egyptian mummies have led to speculation that Ancient Egyptians may have had contact with the New World. The initial discovery was made by a German toxicologist Svetlana Balabanova after examining the mummy of a priestess named Henut Taui. Follow-up tests on the hair shaft, which were performed in order to rule out the possibility of contamination, revealed the same results.

A television show reported that examinations of numerous Sudanese mummies which were also undertaken by Balabanova mirrored what was found in the mummy of Henut Taui. Balabanova suggested that the tobacco may be accounted for since it may have also been known in China and Europe, as indicated by analyses run on human remains from those respective regions. Balabanova proposed that such plants native to the general area may have developed independently, but have since gone extinct. Other explanations include fraud, though curator Alfred Grimm of the Egyptian Museum in Munich disputes this. Skeptical of Balabanova's findings, Rosalie David, Keeper of Egyptology at the Manchester Museum, had similar tests performed on samples which were taken from the Manchester mummy collection and she reported that two of the tissue samples and one hair sample tested positive for the presence of nicotine.

However, mainstream scholars remain skeptical, and they do not see the results of these tests as proof of ancient contact between Africa and the Americas, especially because there could be Old World sources of cocaine and nicotine. Two attempts to replicate Balabanova's findings of cocaine failed, suggesting "that either Balabanova and her associates are misinterpreting their results or that the samples of mummies tested by them have been mysteriously exposed to cocaine".

A re-examination of the mummy of Ramesses II in the 1970s revealed the presence of fragments of tobacco leaves in its abdomen. This finding became a popular topic in fringe literature and the media and it was seen as proof of contact between Ancient Egypt and the New World. The investigator Maurice Bucaille noted that when the mummy was unwrapped in 1886 the abdomen was left open and "it was no longer possible to attach any importance to the presence inside the abdominal cavity of whatever material was found there, since the material could have come from the surrounding environment." Following the renewed discussion of tobacco sparked by Balabanova's research and its mention in a 2000 publication by Rosalie David, a study in the journal Antiquity suggested that reports of both tobacco and cocaine in mummies "ignored their post-excavation histories" and pointed out that the mummy of Ramesses II had been moved five times between 1883 and 1975.

=== Claims of travel in Roman times ===
Pomponius Mela writes, and is copied by Pliny the Elder, that Quintus Caecilius Metellus Celer (died 59 BCE), proconsul in Gaul, received "several Indians" (Indi) who had been driven by a storm to the coasts of Germania as a present from a foreign king, listed by Mela, in different manuscripts, as rege Boorum/Boiorum/Botorum and usually identified in recent scholarship as king of the Boii, though Tausend (1999) argued that it might be corrupted name of the Goths; Pliny identifies the king as the ruler of the Suebi instead:

Ultra Caspium sinum quidnam esset, ambiguum aliquamdiu fuit, idemne Oceanus an tellus infesta frigoribus sine ambitu ac sine fine proiecta. Sed praeter physicos Homerumque qui universum orbem mari circumfusum esse dixerunt, Cornelius Nepos ut recentior, auctoritate sic certior; testem autem rei Quintum Metellum Celerem adicit, eumque ita rettulisse commemorat: cum Galliae pro consule praeesset, Indos quosdam a rege Boiorum dono sibi datos; unde in eas terras devenissent requirendo cognosse, vi tempestatium ex Indicis aequoribus abreptos, emensosque quae intererant, tandem in Germaniae litora exisse. Restat ergo pelagus, sed reliqua lateris eiusdem adsiduo gelu durantur et ideo deserta sunt.

For a long time it was doubtful what there was beyond the Caspian bay: whether the same Ocean, or a land infested with cold, spreading out without circumference and boundless. But, in addition to the natural Philosophers and Homer, who have said that the whole universe was surrounded by sea, Cornelius Nepos, as more recent in authority and hence more certain, is available. Moreover he adds Quintus Metellus Celer as a witness to the fact, and asserts that he related this account: that while he was in charge of the Gauls as proconsul, certain Indians were given to him by a king of the Boii as a gift; and that in inquiring whence they had arrived into these regions, he learned that, driven from Indian waters by the violence of tempests, they had passed over the seas which intervened and finally had come through onto the shores of Germany. Therefore, there remains the sea, but the remaining places of this same side are held in the grip of continual cold and hence are deserted.

Both Mela and Pliny listed this incident as evidence supporting the notion that all lands of the world, including northern parts of Europe and Asia, are surrounded by Oceanus, and that it is theoretically possible to sail from India to Europe through a northern passage.

Since Metellus Celer died just after his consulship, before he ever got to Transalpine Gaul (in the area of present-day southern France), the authors accepting the historicity of the incident either date it to 62 BCE, when Celer was governing Cisalpine Gaul (in the area of present-day northern Italy), or interpret texts of Mela and Pliny as garbled accounts of Celer's encounter with some Indians at an earlier date, when he served as Pompey's legate in Asia.

Richard Hennig suggested that the castaways mentioned by Mela and Pliny were possibly American Indians. Other interpretations of the incident were also proposed. Bengtson (1954), McLaughlin (2016) and Lerner (2020) argued that Celer might have encountered actual merchants from India, who reached Europe from Phasis on the Black Sea coast. Other authors interpret supposed Indians as misidentified speakers of Finno-Ugric languages originating from the areas east of the Bothnian Bay or Baltic Veneti. An article in the Journal of the American Geographical Society of New York published in 1891 suggests that the word "Indos" is so indefinite as to be subject to speculation, and that copyist errors may have changed "Jernos" (Irish) or "Iberos" (Spaniards) to Indos.

=== Icelander DNA finding ===
In 2010, Sigríður Sunna Ebenesersdóttir published a genetic study showing that over 350 living Icelanders carried mitochondrial DNA of a new type, C1e, belonging to the C1 clade which was until then known only from Native American and East Asian populations. Using the deCODE genetics database, Sigríður Sunna determined that the DNA entered the Icelandic population not later than 1700, and likely several centuries earlier. However Sigríður Sunna also states that "while a Native American origin seems most likely for [this new haplogroup], an Asian or European origin cannot be ruled out".

In 2014, a study discovered a new mtDNA subclade C1f from the remains of three people found in north-western Russia and dated to 7,500 years ago. It has not been detected in modern populations. The study proposed the hypothesis that the sister C1e and C1f subclades had split early from the most recent common ancestor of the C1 clade and had evolved independently, and that subclade C1e had a northern European origin. Iceland was settled by the Vikings in the 9th century and they had raided heavily into western Russia, where the sister subclade C1f is now known to have resided. They proposed that both subclades were brought to Iceland through the Vikings, and that C1e went extinct on mainland northern Europe due to population turnover and its small representation, and subclade C1f went extinct completely.

=== Norse legends and sagas ===
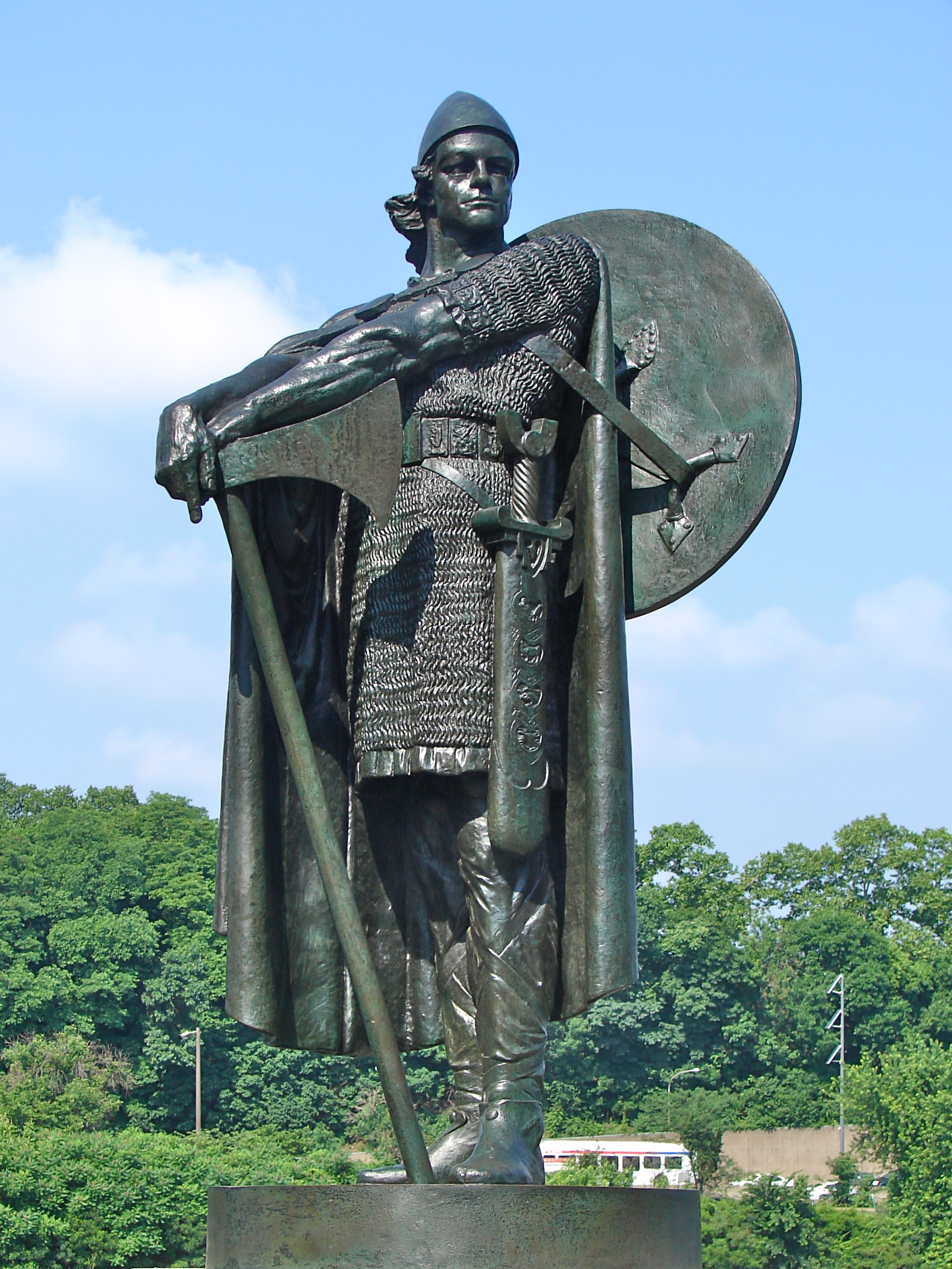
Statue of Thorfinn Karlsefni

In 1009, legends report that Norse explorer Thorfinn Karlsefni abducted two children from Markland, an area on the North American mainland where Norse explorers visited but did not settle. The two children were then taken to Greenland, where they were baptized and taught to speak Norse.

In 1420, Danish geographer Claudius Clavus Swart wrote that he personally had seen "pygmies" from Greenland who were caught by Norsemen in a small skin boat. Their boat was hung in Nidaros Cathedral in Trondheim along with another, longer boat also taken from "pygmies". Clavus Swart's description fits the Inuit and two of their types of boats, the kayak and the umiak. Similarly, the Swedish clergyman Olaus Magnus wrote in 1505 that he saw in Oslo Cathedral two leather boats taken decades earlier. According to Olaus, the boats were captured from Greenland pirates by one of the Haakons, which would place the event in the 14th century.

=== Claims of Inuit travel to the Old World ===
It has been suggested that the Norse took other indigenous peoples to Europe as slaves over the following centuries, because they are known to have taken Scottish and Irish slaves.

In Ferdinand Columbus's biography of his father Christopher, he says that in 1477 his father saw in Galway, Ireland, two dead bodies which had washed ashore in their boat. The bodies and boat were of exotic appearance, and have been suggested to have been Inuit who had drifted off course.

There is also evidence of Inuit coming to Europe under their own power or as captives after 1492. In Scotland, they were known as the Finn-men. A substantial body of Greenland Inuit folklore first collected in the 19th century told of journeys by boat to Akilineq, depicted as a rich country across the ocean.

=== Claims of Inca travel to Oceania ===
Peruvian historian José Antonio del Busto Duthurburu popularized the theory that Inca ruler Topa Inca Yupanqui may have led a maritime exploration voyage across the Pacific Ocean around 1465, eventually reaching French Polynesia and Rapa Nui (Easter Island). Different Spanish chroniclers of the 16th century recount stories told to them by Inca peoples, in which Yupanqui embarked on a sea voyage, eventually reaching two islands referred to as Nina Chumpi ("fire belt") and Hawa Chumpi ("outer belt", also spelled Avachumpi, Hahua chumpi). According to the stories, Yupanqui returned from the expedition bringing back with him black-skinned people, gold, a chair made of brass, and the skin of a horse or an animal similar to a horse. Del Busto speculated the "black-skinned people" may have been Melanesians, while the animal skin may have belonged to a Polynesian wild boar that was misidentified. Critics have pointed out that Yupanqui's expedition—assuming it ever took place—could have reached the Galápagos Islands or some other part of the Americas instead of Oceania.

== Claims based on religious traditions or symbols ==
=== Claims of pre-Columbian contact with Christian voyagers ===
During the period of Spanish colonization of the Americas, several indigenous myths and works of art led a number of Spanish chroniclers and authors to suggest that Christian preachers may have visited Mesoamerica well before the Age of Discovery. Bernal Díaz del Castillo, for example, was intrigued by the presence of cross symbols in Maya hieroglyphs, which according to him suggested that other Christians may have arrived in ancient Mexico before the Spanish conquistadors. Fray Diego Durán, for his part, linked the legend of the Pre-Columbian god Quetzalcoatl (whom he describes as being chaste, penitent, and a miracle-worker) to the Biblical accounts of Christian apostles. Bartolomé de las Casas describes Quetzalcoatl as being fair-skinned, tall, and bearded (therefore suggesting an Old World origin), while Fray Juan de Torquemada credits him with bringing agriculture to the Americas. Modern scholarship has cast serious doubts on several of these claims, since agriculture was practiced in the Americas well before the emergence of Christianity in the Old World, and Maya crosses have been found to have a very different symbolism from that present in Christian religious traditions.

According to Pre-Columbian myth, Quetzalcoatl departed Mexico in ancient times by travelling east across the ocean, promising he would return. Some scholars have argued that Aztec emperor Moctezuma Xocoyotzin believed Spanish conquistador Hernán Cortés (who arrived in what today is Mexico from the east) to be Quetzalcoatl, and his arrival to be a fulfilling of the myth's prophecy, though others have disputed this claim. Fringe theories suggest that Quetzalcoatl may have been a Christian preacher from the Old World who lived among indigenous peoples of ancient Mexico, and eventually attempted to return home by sailing eastwards. Carlos de Sigüenza y Góngora, for example, speculated that the Quetzalcoatl myth might have originated from a visit to the Americas by Thomas the Apostle in the 1st century CE. Later on, Fray Servando Teresa de Mier argued that the cloak with the image of the Virgin of Guadalupe, which the Catholic Church claims was worn by Juan Diego, was instead brought to the Americas much earlier by Thomas, who used it as an instrument for evangelization.

Mexican historian Manuel Orozco y Berra conjectured that both the cross hieroglyphs and the Quetzalcoatl myth might have originated on a visit to Mesoamerica by a Catholic Norse missionary in medieval times. However, there is no archaeological or historical evidence to suggest that the Norse explorations ever made it as far as ancient Mexico or Central America. Other proposed identities for Quetzalcoatl (attributed to their proponents pursuing religious agendas) include St. Brendan or even Jesus Christ.

A popular thread of conspiracy theory originating with Holy Blood, Holy Grail has it that the Templars used a fleet of 18 ships at La Rochelle to escape arrest in France. The fleet allegedly left laden with knights and treasures just before the issue of the warrant for the arrest of the Order in October 1307. This, in turn, was based on a single item of testimony from serving brother Jean de Châlon, who says he had "heard people talking that [Gerard de Villiers had] put to sea with 18 galleys, and the brother Hugues de Chalon fled with the whole treasury of the brother Hugues de Pairaud." However, aside from being the sole source for this statement, the transcript indicates that it is hearsay, and this serving brother seems to be prone to making some of the wildest and most damning of claims about the Order, which have led some to doubt his credibility. What destination, if any, was reached by this fleet is uncertain. A fringe theory suggests the fleet may have made its way to the Americas, where the Knights Templar interacted with the aboriginal population. Helen Nicholson of Cardiff University has cast doubt on the existence of this voyage, arguing that the Knights Templar did not have ships capable of navigating the Atlantic Ocean.

=== Claims of ancient Jewish migration to the Americas ===
From the first centuries of European colonization of the Americas until the 19th century, several European intellectuals and theologians tried to account for the presence of the Amerindian aboriginal peoples by connecting them to the Ten Lost Tribes of Israel, who were deported following the conquest of the Israelite kingdom by the Neo-Assyrian Empire according to the Biblical account. These efforts have been used to advance the interests of religious groups, both Jewish and Christian, and they have also been used to justify European colonization of the Americas.

One of the first people to claim that the indigenous peoples of the Americas were descendants of the Lost Tribes was the Portuguese rabbi and writer Menasseh Ben Israel (1604-1657), who argued in his book The Hope of Israel that the discovery of the alleged long-lost Jews heralded the imminent coming of the Biblical Messiah. In 1650, a Norfolk preacher, Thomas Thorowgood, published Jewes in America or Probabilities that the Americans are of that Race, for the New England missionary society. Tudor Parfitt wrote:

The society was active in trying to convert the Indians but suspected that they might be Jews and realized they better be prepared for an arduous task. Thorowgood's tract argued that the native population of North America were descendants of the Ten Lost Tribes.

In 1652, Sir Hamon L'Estrange, an English author writing on history and theology, published Americans no Jews, or improbabilities that the Americans are of that Race in response to the tract by Thorowgood. In response to L'Estrange, Thorowgood published a second edition of his book in 1660 with a revised title and included a foreword written by John Eliot, a Puritan missionary who had translated the Bible into an Indian language.

Elias Boudinot, a signatory to the U.S. Declaration of Independence, made similar claims in his 1816 book titled A Star in the West: A Humble Attempt to Discover the Long Lost Ten Tribes of Israel; Preparatory to Their Return to Their Beloved City, Jerusalem.

=== Latter Day Saint movement's teachings ===
The Book of Mormon, a sacred text of the Latter Day Saint movement, states that some indigenous inhabitants of the New World are the descendants of Semitic peoples who sailed from the Old World and established settlements in the New World in ancient times. There is no support for the historicity of the Book of Mormon from genetic or archaeological studies because the ancestors of Native American peoples were not of Middle Eastern origin. Since the 1850s Mormon leaders have identified Polynesian islands with the "islands of the sea" which are described in the Book of Mormon and they have also taught the belief that the people who live there are the descendants of Israelite people. In a 1998 letter, the National Geographic Society stated it "does not know of anything found so far that has substantiated the Book of Mormon." Some LDS scholars hold the view that archaeological studies of the Book of Mormon's claims are not meant to vindicate the literary narrative. For example, Terryl Givens, professor of English at the University of Richmond, argues that there is a lack of historical accuracy in the Book of Mormon in relation to modern archaeological knowledge.

== See also ==
- Ancient maritime history
- Antillia – 15th-century phantom island
- Atlantis Expedition – 1984 Argentine raft journey across Atlantic Ocean
- Burrows Cave – Alleged cave site
- Columbian exchange
- Davenport Tablets – Three inscribed slate tables found in the United States in the 1870s
- Diffusion (anthropology)
- Genetic history of indigenous peoples of the Americas
- Gwennan Gorn – Ship of supposed Welsh sea-voyager
- Hyperdiffusionism
- Hyperdiffusionism in archaeology
- Institute for the Study of American Cultures
- Jean Cousin (navigator)
- Jewish Indian theory
- Kensington Runestone – Faked Viking runestone in Minnesota, US
- Kon-Tiki expedition – 1947 raft journey from South America to Polynesia
- Magna Bowl
- Maine penny – Norwegian silver coin
- Newport Tower (Rhode Island) – Remains of 17th-century windmill in the United States
- Origins of Paleoindians
- Population history of the indigenous peoples of the Americas
- Pre-Columbian rafts
- Vinland Map – Forged 'Norse' map of North America
- Westford Knight – Pattern on a rock in the United States
