= Bacalao (phantom island) =

Phantom island allegedly off Newfoundland

Bacalao, Bacallao, or Terra do Bacalhau was a phantom island depicted on several early 16th century Portuguese maps and nautical charts. The name is a variation of bacalhau, meaning "cod" or "stockfish".

According to Gaspar Frutuoso in his work Saudades da Terra, written in the 1570s, a joint crew of Didrik Pining, John Scolvus, Hans Pothorst, Álvaro Martins, and João Vaz Corte-Real in 1472 was granted lands in the Azores by the king of Portugal, because of his discovery of the Terras do Bacalhau. Historians do not consider the work of Frutuoso as very reliable, as it contains a great deal of misinformation.

Off the northwest tip of Newfoundland's Avalon Peninsula is an island named Bacalaos, known to Europeans by that name since at least 1556, when it was drawn on the Gastaldi map as "Bacalaos".

== See also ==
- Brasil (mythical island)
- Cape Cod
- Pre-Columbian transoceanic contact theories
- Sacred Cod of Massachusetts
- Vinland

== Bibliography ==
- Diffie, Bailey Wallys; Shafer, Boyd C.; Winius, George Davison (1977), Foundations of the Portuguese Empire, 1415–1580, U of Minnesota Press, ISBN 9780816607822
