= List of maritime explorers =

This is a list of maritime explorers. The list includes explorers who have substantially contributed to human knowledge of the planet's geography, weather, biodiversity, and human cultures, or who have significantly contributed to the expansion of trade and communication between populations.

== Ocean explorers ==
Nationality	Sailed for	Name	First voyage of exploration	Last voyage of exploration	Arctic	North Atlantic	Indian	Pacific	South Atlantic	Southern
Portuguese	Portugal	de Abreu, António	1507	1512						
Portuguese	Portugal	de Albuquerque, Afonso	1503							
Dutch	Netherlands	Carstenszoon, Jan								
Portuguese	Portugal	de Alenquer, Pero	1487	1488						
Portuguese	Portugal	de Almeida, Francisco								
Portuguese	Portugal	Álvares, Jorge								
Portuguese	Portugal	de Azambuja, Diogo								
Portuguese	Portugal	de Lisboa, João								
Portuguese	Portugal	de Barcelos, Pero								
Newfoundlander	United States	Bartlett, Robert								
Dutch	Netherlands	Barentsz, Willem								
Estonian	Russia	von Bellingshausen, Fabian Gottlieb						*		
Danish	Russia	Bering, Vitus						*		
French	France	de Bougainville, Louis Antoine								
English	Britain	Byron, John								
Italian	England	Cabot, John								
Italian	England and Aragon	Cabot, Sebastian								
Portuguese	Portugal	Cabral, Pedro Álvares								
Portuguese	Spain	Cabrillo, João Rodrígues								
Italian	Portugal	Cadamosto. Alvise								
Portuguese	Portugal	Caminha, Álvaro								
Portuguese	Portugal	de Caminha, Pero Vaz								
Portuguese	Portugal	Cão, Diogo								
French	France	Cartier, Jacques	1534							
English	England	Cavendish, Thomas	1586-1588							
French	France	de Champlain, Samuel								
Portuguese	Portugal	Coelho, Gonçalo								
Portuguese	Portugal	Coelho, Nicolau								
Italian	Spain	Columbus, Christopher								
English	Britain	Cook, James	1768–1771	1776–1779				3		1
Portuguese	Portugal	Corte-Real, Gaspar								
Portuguese	Portugal	Corte-Real, Miguel								
Portuguese	Portugal	da Cunha, Tristão								
English	England	Dampier, William								
English	England and Netherlands	Davis, John								
Russian	Russia	Dezhnev, Semyon						*		
Portuguese	Portugal	Dias, Bartolomeu								
Portuguese	Portugal	Dias, Dinis								
Portuguese	Portugal	Dias, Diogo								
Portuguese	Portugal	Dias, Pero								
Portuguese	Portugal	do Pó, Fernão								
English	England	Drake, Francis	1577–1581	1577–1581			1	1	1	
Portuguese	Portugal	Eanes, Gil								
Norwegian	Norse	Erik the Red								
Icelandic	Norse	Ericson, Leif								
Portuguese	Portugal	Escobar, Pedro								
Portuguese	Portugal	Fernandes, Álvaro								
English	Britain	Flinders, Matthew								
English	England	Frobisher, Martin								
Portuguese	Portugal	da Gama, Estêvão								
Portuguese	Portugal	da Gama, Paulo								
Portuguese	Portugal	da Gama, Vasco	1497-1499	1524						
Italian	France	da Verrazzano, Giovanni								
English	England and Ireland	Gilbert, Humphrey								
Dutch	Netherlands	Gerritsz Vries, Maarten								
Russian	Russia	Golovnin, Vasily						*		
Portuguese	Portugal	Gonçalves, André								
Portuguese	Portugal	Gonçalves, Antão								
Portuguese	Portugal	Gonçalves, Lopes								
Portuguese	Portugal	Grego, João								
Dutch	Netherlands	Hartog, Dirk								
English	England	Hudson, Henry								
Portuguese	Portugal	Infante, João								
Dutch	Netherlands	Janszoon, Willem								
Baltic German	Russia	von Kotzebue, Otto						*		
Baltic German	Russia and Britain	Kruzenshtern, Ivan Fedorovich						*		
French	France	de Lapérouse, Jean François de Galaup, comte								
Portuguese	Portugal and England	Lavrador, João Fernandes								
Russian	Russia and Britain	Lazarev, Mikhail Petrovich						*		
Portuguese	Portugal	de Lemos, Gaspar								
Russian	Russia	Litke, Fyodor Petrovich						*		
Portuguese	Spain and Portugal	Magellan, Ferdinand								
Dutch	Netherlands	le Maire, Jacob								
Portuguese	Portugal	Martins, Álvaro								
Portuguese	Portugal	Mascarenhas, Pedro								
Spanish	Spain	de Mendaña, Álvaro	1567-1569							
Genoese	Portugal	Noli, António								
Dutch	Netherlands	Nuyts, Pieter								
Portuguese	Portugal	de Noronha, Fernão								
Galician	Portugal	da Nova, João								
French	France	Paulmyer, Binot								
Portuguese	Portugal	Pereira, Duarte Pacheco								
Portuguese	Portugal	Perestrelo, Bartolomeu								
German	Denmark and Hamburg	Pining, Didrik								
Portuguese	Portugal	Pinto, Fernão Mendes								
Portuguese	Portugal	Pires, Luís								
Portuguese	Spain	de Queirós, Pedro Fernandes								
Portuguese	Portugal	Rodrigues, Diogo								
Dutch	Netherlands	Roggeveen, Jacob								
Portuguese	Portugal	de Santarém, João								
Dutch	Netherlands	Schouten, Willem								
Irish	Britain	Shackleton, Ernest								
Portuguese	Portugal	Silves, Diogo								
Portuguese	Portugal	de Sintra, Pedro								
English	Britain	Smith, William								
Portuguese	Spain	Soromenho, Sebastião Rodrígues								
Portuguese	Portugal	de Sousa, Martim Afonso								
Dutch	Netherlands	Tasman, Abel								
Portuguese	Portugal	Teixeira, Tristão Vaz								
Portuguese or Spanish (Galician)	Spain	de Torres, Luis Váez								
Dutch	Netherlands	Thijssen, François								
Portuguese	Portugal	Tristão, Nuno								
English	Britain	Vancouver, George								
Portuguese	Portugal	Vaz Corte-Real, João								
Portuguese	Portugal	Velho, Gonçalo								
Italian	France	da Verrazzano, Giovanni								
Italian	Spain and Portugal	Vespucci, Amerigo								
English	Britain	Wallis, Samuel								
Baltic German	Russia	Wrangel, Ferdinand Petrovich						*		
Portuguese	Portugal	Zarco, João Gonçalves								
Chinese	China (Three Kingdoms period of China)	Kang Tai	300							
Chinese	China (Three Kingdoms period of China)	Zhu Ying	300							
Chinese	China (Yuen dynasty)	Wang Dayuan	1330							
Chinese	China (Ming dynasty)	Zheng He	1405	1431						
Chinese	China (Ming dynasty)	Ma Huan	1413							
Chinese	China (Ming dynasty)	Fei Xin	1409							

== See also ==
- Explorer
- Polar explorer
- List of Italian explorers
- List of Russian explorers
- Timeline of maritime migration and exploration
