= John Scolvus =

Purported Polish explorer

- Born: about 1435 probably Kolno, Duchy of Masovia
- Died: about 1484
- Other name: John of Kolno
- Education: University of Kraków
- Occupations: Maritime explorer

John Scolvus or John of Kolno may have been a navigator of the late 15th century. According to some sources he was among a group of early Europeans to reach the shores of the Americas prior to Columbus, arriving in 1476 as steersman of Didrik Pining, although this view is not supported by contemporary evidence; as he is not mentioned contemporaneously, his identity and even existence have been disputed.

== Pining expedition ==
It has been claimed that in the 1470s, a fleet of several Danish ships sponsored by Christian I of Denmark set sail from Norway westwards to Greenland. There was such a fleet in 1473 or 1476, commanded by John of Kolno, supposedly a Polish navigator at the service of the king of Denmark. According to speculations lacking surviving written evidence, the fleet was commanded by two Baltic sailors and pirate hunters, Didrik Pining and Hans Pothorst and possibly also included the Portuguese João Vaz Corte-Real on one of the journeys. It has been claimed that from the Western coast of Greenland they may have reached the North American mainland. The story cannot be verified today, since the only surviving records tell us that Pothorst and Pining saw a "rocky island called Hvitsark, halfway between Iceland and Greenland" in 1494, as described by Samuel Eliot Morison in his "The European Discovery of America, The Northern Voyages". John of Kolno ("Jan z Kolna" in Polish, eventually "Jan Scolvo") by contrast, was a navigator who led a Danish fleet to the coast of Labrador in 1476, or even 1473, according to one source, at the command of Christian I of Denmark.

== Sources for his alleged existence ==
It is not certain if John Scolvus really existed and whether he reached America aboard these ships. All sources mentioning him were written long afterwards. Some evidence may suggest that Scolvus did exist and sailed to some location in the North Atlantic. The earliest mention of him is on a 1536 globe of cartographer Gemma Frisius which depicts an area within the Arctic Circle, north of a strait dividing Terra Corterealis and Baccalearum Regio from the westward projection of Greenland. Within this area is the inscription, "Quij, the people to whom Joes Scoluss, a Dane, penetrated about the year 1476." According to the Encyclopedia of Newfoundland and Labrador "Based on study of toponymy and cartography, most scholars have concluded that Scolvus visited Greenland and not Labrador." (Friseus’ knowledge of Labrador may have come from Portuguese sources). DCB /. acb (Note: Original caption: Quij populi ad quos Joes Scoluss danus peruenit circa annum 1476.)

Spanish author Francisco López de Gómara wrote in his Historia de las Indias (1553) about la Tierra de Labrador; "Hither also came men from Norway with the pilot [navigator] Joan Scoluo, and Englishmen with Sebastian [should be John] Gaboto." (In the sixteenth century, Greenland is known to have been referred to as "Labrador" by south European sources). Gómara had supposedly met Olaus Magnus in Bologna and Venice, perhaps in 1548. This suggests that the source of the statement about "Joan Scoluo" may have been him.

Another possible reference to John Scolvus visiting Labrador is a document prepared in about 1575 for the first voyage of Martin Frobisher. After stating that Sebastian (should be John) "Cabotte" was sent out by King Henry VII in 1496 (should be 1497) to find the passage from the Atlantic Ocean to the Pacific, and that "one Caspar Cortesreales, a pilot of Portingale", had visited these islands on the north coast of North America in 1500, the document continues: "But to find oute the passage oute of the North Sea into the Southe we must sayle to the 60 degree, that is, from 66 unto 68. And this passage is called the Narowe Sea or Streicte of the three Brethren [i.e., the three brothers Corte-Real]; in which passage, at no tyme in the yere, is ise wonte to be found. The cause is the swifte ronnyng downe of sea into sea. In the north side of this passage, John Scolus, a pilot of Denmerke, was in anno 1476." While further containing complete impossibilities, the text also contain statements that have a sure historical foundation, like the voyage of Gaspar Corte-Real.

On an English map from 1582 by Michael Lok, there is a country to the north-west of Greenland, on which is written: "Jac. Scolvus Croetland". The corresponding country on Mercator's map of 1569 is "Croclant, island whose inhabitants are Swedes by descent".

In 1597, the Brabanter Cornelius Wytfliet wrote in his Continens Indica that the northern parts of America were first discovered by "Frislandish" fishermen, and later were further explored about 1390 by the Zeno brothers. He further writes; "but the honour of its second discovery fell to the Pole Johannes Scoluus (Johannes Scoluus Polonus), who in the year 1476 — eighty-six years after its first discovery — sailed beyond Norway, Greenland, Frisland, penetrated the Northern Strait, under the very Arctic Circle, and arrived at the country of Labrador and Estotiland". Fridtjof Nansen suggested that Polonus was a misreading of piloto from the earlier account by Gomara which Wytfliet's writings is thought to have relied on.

On the L'Ecuy globe, of the sixteenth century, it is written in Latin that between 70° and 80° N. lat. and in long. "These are the people to whom the Dane Johannes Scowus penetrated in the year 1476." Hansen suggested that "The description of Scolvus as a Dane may indicate the same source as the English mention of him in 1576."

Generally, the later sources about Scolvus are less reliable, since the writers probably read the earlier accounts and more or less copied from them.

== Speculations ==
Some historians have variously described Scolvus as a Norwegian pilot, Catalan corsair, Welsh shipmaster and Polish navigator. Such claims have been criticised as being opportunistic in nature. Some writers (initially Peruvian librarian Louis Ulloa in 1934) have even speculated that Johannes Scolvus may have been the young Christopher Columbus, and others that he is identical with Hans Pothorst or João Vaz Corte-Real.

=== Polish origin theory ===
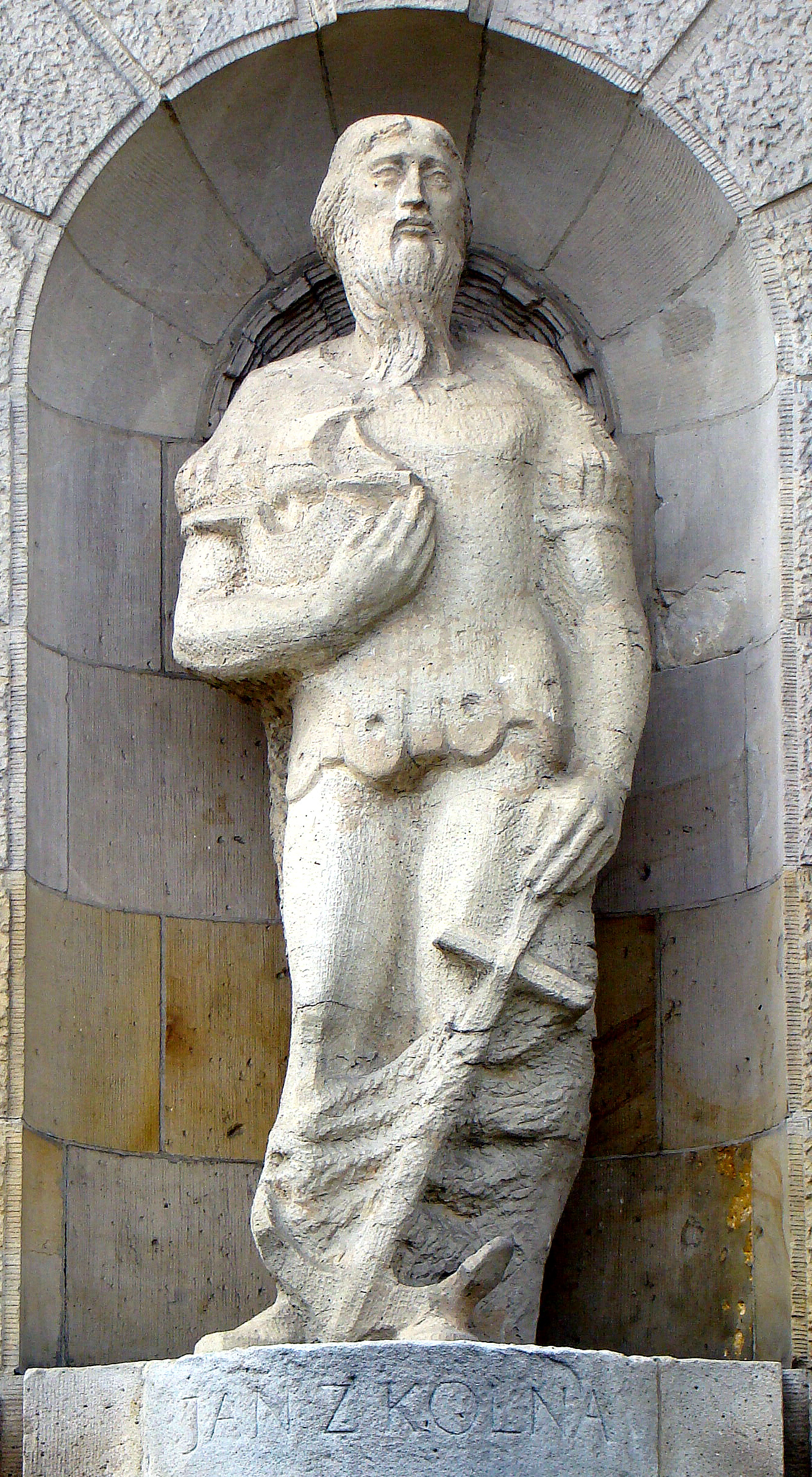
John Scolvus as depicted by a statue from modern times in Szczecin, Poland with the name rendered in Polish as Jan z Kolna.

Polish historian and cartographer Joachim Lelewel (1786 - 1861) was the first to gather all available mentions of Johannes Scolnus. He quoted a source from 1570 by François de Belleforest, a source from 1599 by Wytfliet, and another from 1671 which claimed that Scolvus was Polish. Lelewel claimed that his name was really Jan z Kolna (English: John of Kolno), and was the navigator of the Danish fleet. He also found mentions of a Joannis de Colno who studied at the Krakow Academy in 1455, and a Colno or Cholno family of merchants and sailors living in Danzig.

==== Criticisms ====
Bolesław Olszewicz, a modern historian who has criticized Lelewel, argues there is not enough evidence to prove that Scolvus was actually Polish. Most of the works that mention Johannes Scolvus were published more than a century after the voyage and no contemporary evidence has been found.

== See also ==
- Pre-Columbian trans-oceanic contact

== Sources ==
- Hughes, Thomas L. (2004), The German discovery of America. A review of the controversy over Pining's 1473 voyage of exploration, vol. 27, German Studies Review, pp. 503–526, archived from the original on 2012-07-29
- Nansen, Fridtjof; Chater, Arthur G. (1911), In Northern Mists: Arctic Exploration in Early Times, Frederick A. Stokes co., pp. 124–129
