= Bacalar (disambiguation) =

Bacalar can refer to:

- Bacalar Municipality, Quintana Roo, Mexico
  - Bacalar, seat and largest town in Bacalar Municipality
- Bentley Bacalar, a two-seater grand tourer
- Bacalar (phantom island), a phantom island depicted on several early 16th century Portuguese maps
- Băţălar (called Bacalár in Hungarian), village in Bretea Română, Romania
