= Tunquén =

Beach in Chile

Coordinates: 33°15′0″S 71°36′0″W

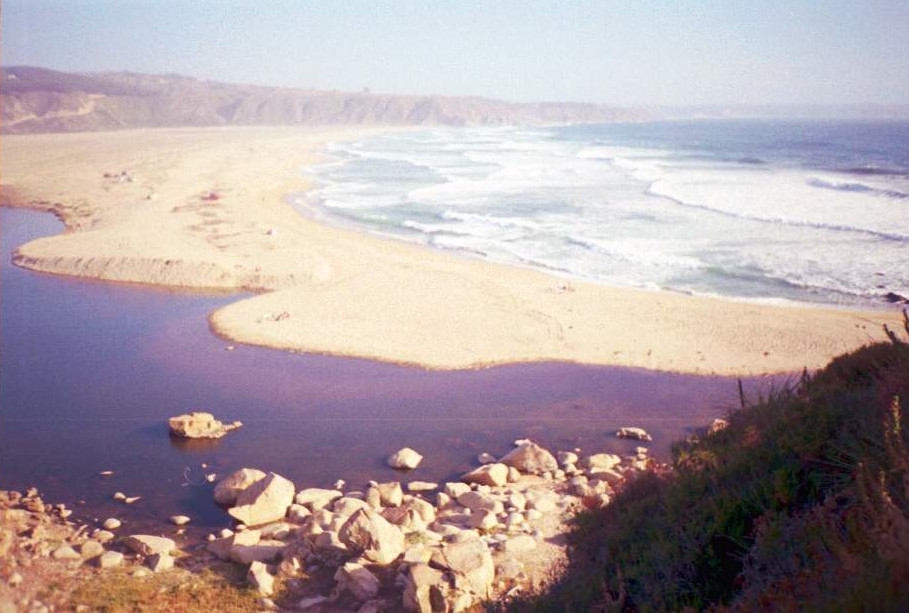
View of the Tunquén Beach and its lagoon from the north.

Tunquén is a beach and locality on the coast of Valparaíso Region, Chile. The beach is known for its relatively intact nature lacking houses or other infrastructure. The area contains archaeological sites corresponding to pre-Hispanic tombs and shell middens (Spanish: conchal). The archaeology of Tunquén has been investigated as holding possible evidence of pre-Hispanic Polynesian presence in Chile.
