= Pero Dias =

Portuguese explorer (fl. 15th century)

Pero Dias (fl. 15th century) was a Portuguese explorer of the African coast. He accompanied his brothers Bartolomeu Dias and Diogo Dias on their journey around the Cape of Good Hope in 1487/1488, having commanded the supply with his brother Diogo. His voyage's original goal, however was only to reach the Cape of Good Hope as opposed to round it; however, when his ship was caught in a storm, they were blown around the Cape to the east side of Africa. Feeling they had already gone far enough, they returned to Europe.
