= Didrik Pining =

German privateer and nobleman (c. 1430–1491)

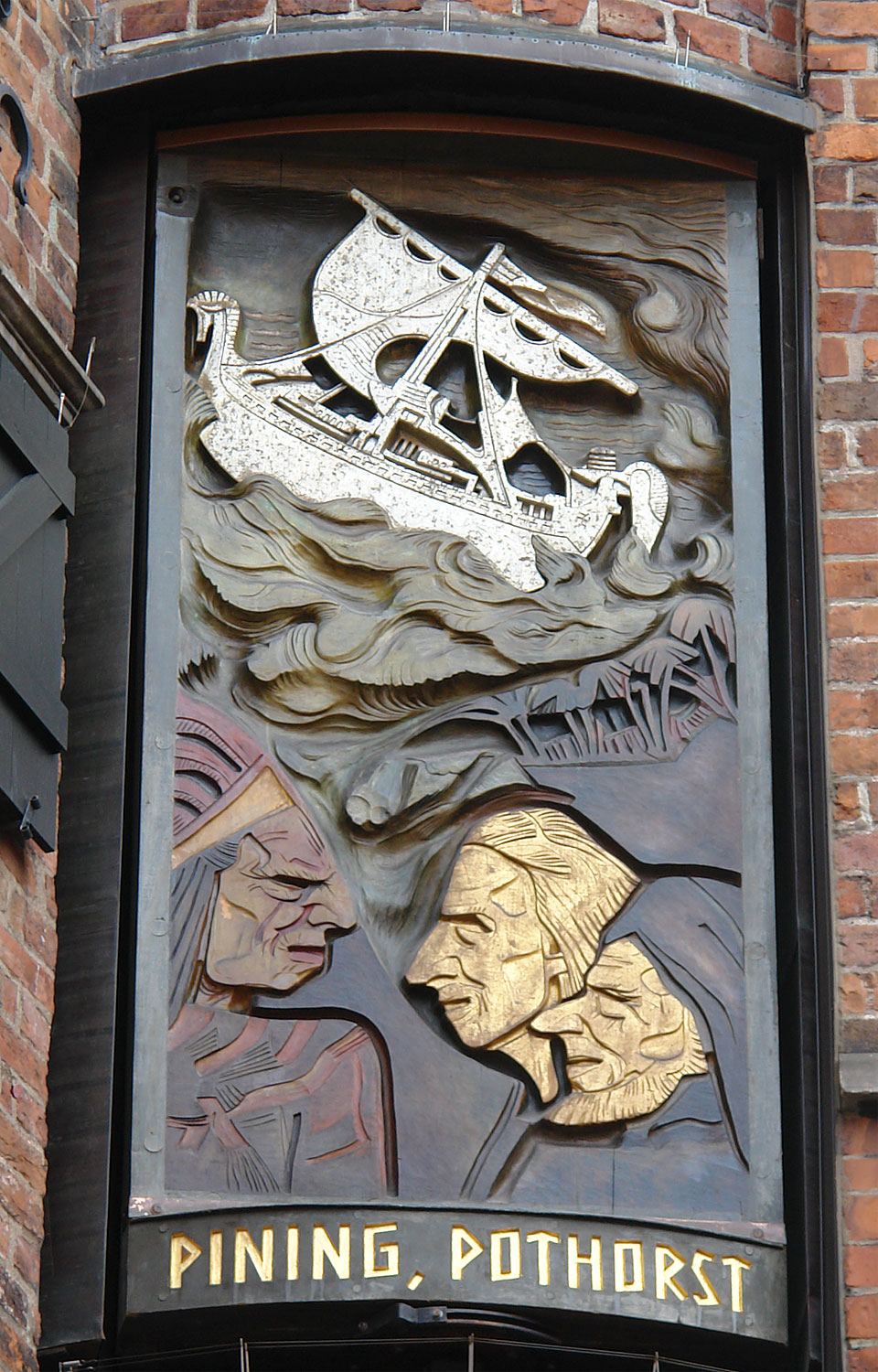
Figures from modern times (20th century) of Pining and his partner Pothorst by Bernhard Hoetger at the Bremen Böttcherstraße Haus des Glockenspiels. The image is based on the notion of them having reached America and also encountered a Native American.

Didrik Pining (c. 1430 – 1491) was a German privateer, nobleman, and governor of Iceland and Vardøhus.

In 1925, researcher Sofus Larson proposed that Pining may have landed in North America in the 1470s, almost twenty years before Columbus' voyages of discovery. Some of the claims concerning Pining are controversial because information about him is relatively sparse and partially contradictory.

== Biography ==
=== Early life ===
Didrik Pining has been found by modern German genealogists to have been a native of Hildesheim in Germany, and this has been, according to a report, "suddenly and conclusively proved." It had been assumed that he was a Dane or Norwegian until the 1930s.

In Hanseatic records until 1468, he is mentioned as a privateer or naval captain in the service of Hamburg, charged with hunting down English merchant ships in the North Atlantic. From 1468 to 1478, he was in the service of Denmark (by 1470 as an "admiral") first under Christian I of Denmark (ruled 1448–1481), and later for his son, John of Denmark (ruled 1481–1513). Before his employment by the Danes, Pining and his partner Hans Pothorst had also been regarded by the Hanseatic League as "pirates who did much damage to the Hanse towns." During the later years of the reign of Christian I, Pining and Pothorst are said to have distinguished themselves "not less as capable seamen than as matchless freebooters."

=== Alleged trip to America ===
==== Sofus Larsen's theory ====
The theory of the Pining voyage reaching America was published for the first time by Sofus Larsen of the University of Copenhagen in his book The Discovery of North America Twenty Years Before Columbus in 1925. Larsen based his claims on various sources (mainly three) which had no immediately apparent connection. Pining was according to Larsen appointed leader of an expedition to the north towards Greenland in the early 1470s. He, together with Hans Pothorst (also from Hildesheim), and the Portuguese explorers João Vaz Corte-Real and Álvaro Martins, were said to have been the principals in the expedition. The navigator was supposedly the semi-mythical figure named John Scolvus. According to Larsen, the mission likely started off from Bergen, went on through to Iceland and Greenland, and eventually discovered Terra do Bacalhau, the "Land of Codfish", later presumed to be Newfoundland or Labrador. While it is known that Pining and Corte-Real were respectively appointed governors of Iceland (1478) and the Azores (1474), these appointments were according to Larsen a reward for having discovered the Land of Codfish.

==== General research ====
Larsen's claims have enjoyed strong scholarly and public support in Scandinavia and Portugal, but they have been more disputed among German scholars. Reception of the account by American and English historians has generally ranged from ridicule to acceptance of the plausibility of at least part of it. Many further circumstances are known to support the theory, although it is generally concluded that the theory is "not proven" (nor sufficiently "disproven"), with any possible "final proof" lacking.

Regardless, no sources explicitly support that Pining and Pothorst had any connections with the journey by Corte-Real, nor that they reached North America (excluding Greenland). What is known however, is that Pining and Pothorst were sent out by a royal Danish order to find out which of several possible policies concerning trade in Iceland should be developed, in which settlements and harbours. Pining's orders further included investigating what formerly, in the 11th century, had been called the regiones finitimae (i.e. "the coasts opposite those still-remembered but obsolete settlements in Greenland"). In 1476, they made this trip, which likely went to Greenland, where they were reported to have encountered hostile Inuit, and no Norse people. The location they visited is assumed by some to have been around Angmagssalik. Nothing specific suggests it went further west than this.

=== Later years ===
In 1478, Didrik Pining became the governor (höfuðsmaðr) of Iceland, serving until 1481, when he is mentioned as having "fared out of Iceland." He replaced the former governor Thorleif Björnsson, whose struggle to marry his own cousin Ingvild was supported by Pining. The following year, Thorleif gave Pining silver and a horn of walrus ivory to pay the king for a license for his union. The agreement was constituted in 1484, merging two of Iceland's most fortunate political dynasties. In the same year, there came complaints of Pining and his men having raped women and stolen money from farmers. In 1481, Pining was present at the funeral of Danish king Christian I. He also made state visits of homage to Bergen and Copenhagen, became knighted in Norway, and employed his personal coat of arms which featured a grappling hook. Some years later, in 1489 and 1490, he is again described as "governor (hirdstjore) over the whole of Iceland" in two Icelandic laws or edicts (the so-called Pining's Laws). A later chronicler says about him that "he was in many ways a serviceable man and put many things right that were wrong." His godson and nephew, Didrik Pining the Younger, succeeded him in 1490, and was governor for the two following years.

Pining, together with Hans Pothorst, patrolled North Atlantic waters and played prominent roles in the Anglo-Danish Naval War (1484–90). Around 1484, he captured, off the coast of England or Brittany and in the Spanish Sea, three Spanish or Portuguese ships which he brought to King John of Denmark in Copenhagen. He accompanied John to Bergen in 1486 as admiral of the royal fleet. In 1487, he led a fleet to the island of Gotland in the Baltic Sea, and secured it for Denmark. In a treaty concluded between John of Denmark and the Dutch in 1490, it is, however, expressly stated that Didrik Pining (and another admiral named Bartold Busch) were to be excluded from the peace. He was then also spoken of as a lord of Iceland. In the same year, Pining was appointed governor of Vardøhus, and may thus have been commander-in-chief of the seas and lands in northern waters.

Didrik Pining likely died (was possibly killed) around Finnmark or the North Cape in 1491. In the Skibby Chronicle, Pining (and Pothorst) are mentioned among many pirates who "met with a miserable death, being either slain by their friends or hanged on the gallows or drowned in the waves of the sea," although this has been disputed by some modern historians.

== Later references ==
In a letter to Christian III of Denmark in 1551, the mayor of Kiel, Carsten Griep, sent the king two maps of the north Atlantic made during the expeditions of Pining and Pothorst, "who were sent out by your majesty's royal grandfather King Christian the First, at the request of his majesty of Portugal, with certain ships to explore new countries and islands in the north, have raised on the rock Wydthszerck, lying off Greenland and towards Sniefeldsiekel in Iceland on the sea, a great sea-mark on account of the Greenland pirates (presumably Inuit)."

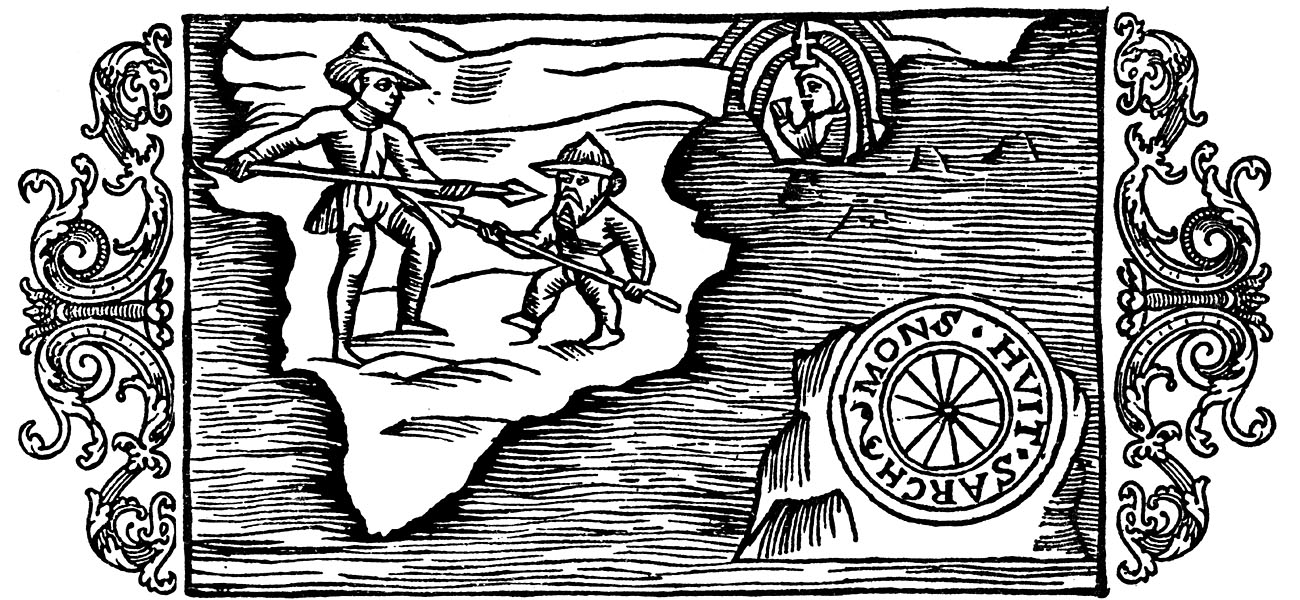
Olaus Magnus' account is illustrated by one of his woodcuts (seen above), resembling the southern Greenland coast where Hvidserk is seen, and the explorers combating Eskimos.

Olaus Magnus wrote in 1555 that Pining and Pothorst, due to their piracy, had "by the Nordic kings been excluded from all human contact and declared outlaws, as a result of their extremely violent robberies and numerous cruel acts against all sailors that they could catch, whether close or distant." They then took refuge at a cliff called Hvidserken, which apparently was located between Iceland and Greenland. Magnus added that in "1494", the pirates created a giant compass out of a considerable circular space at the top of the cliff, with rings and lines formed of lead, to make it easier for them to know in which direction they could seek a great plunder. Modern historians have suggested that they may in fact have set up some mark at the coast of Greenland to reclaim it for the Danish king.

In 1625, a report from London talks about Pining and Pothorst (Punnus and Potharse) and states that Pining "gave the Islanders their Lawes," referred to later as Pining's Law, the written Icelandic law.

== See also ==
- Pre-Columbian trans-oceanic contact
- Hans Pothorst
- John Scolvus
- João Vaz Corte-Real
- Álvaro Martins
