= Gwennan Gorn =

Ship of supposed Welsh sea-voyager

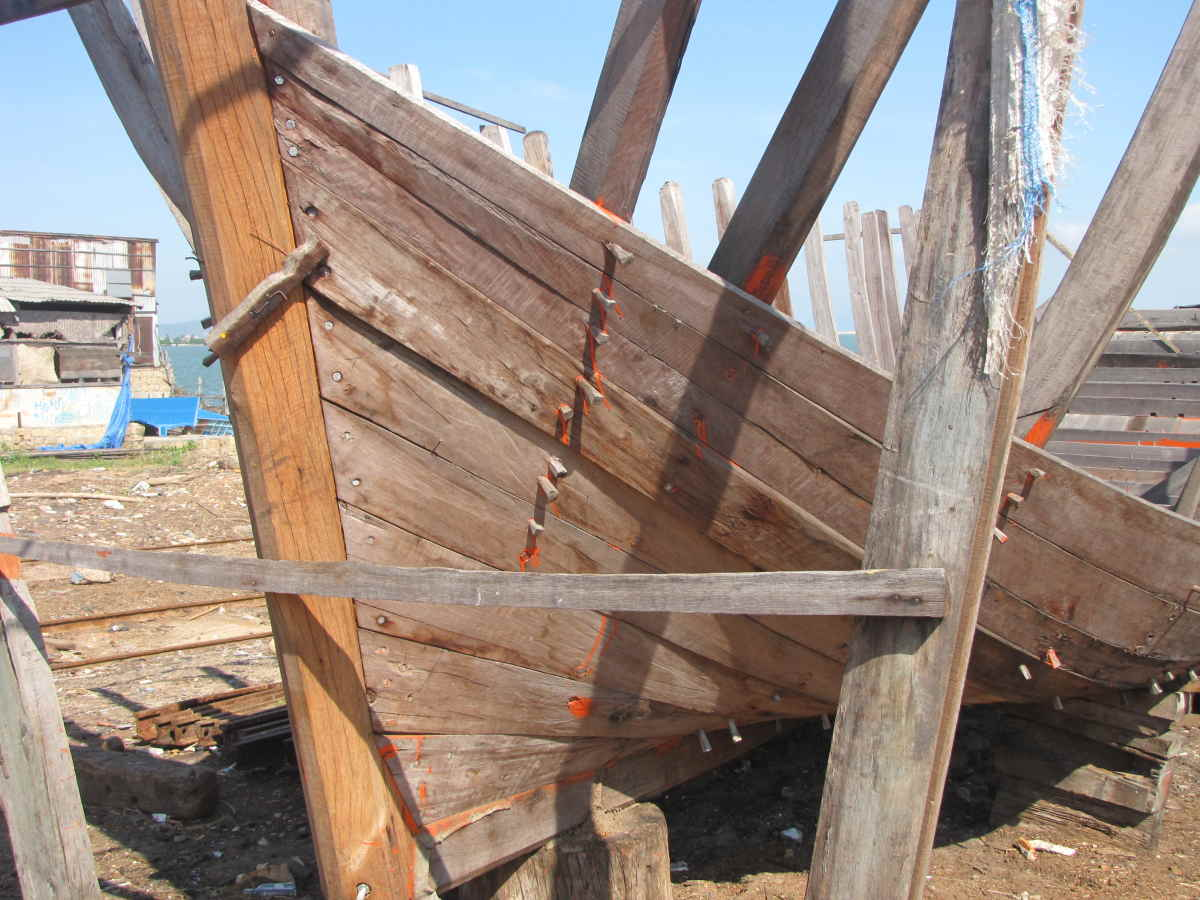
Plank construction using wooden nails, a similar construction to that supposedly used in the Gwennan Gorn

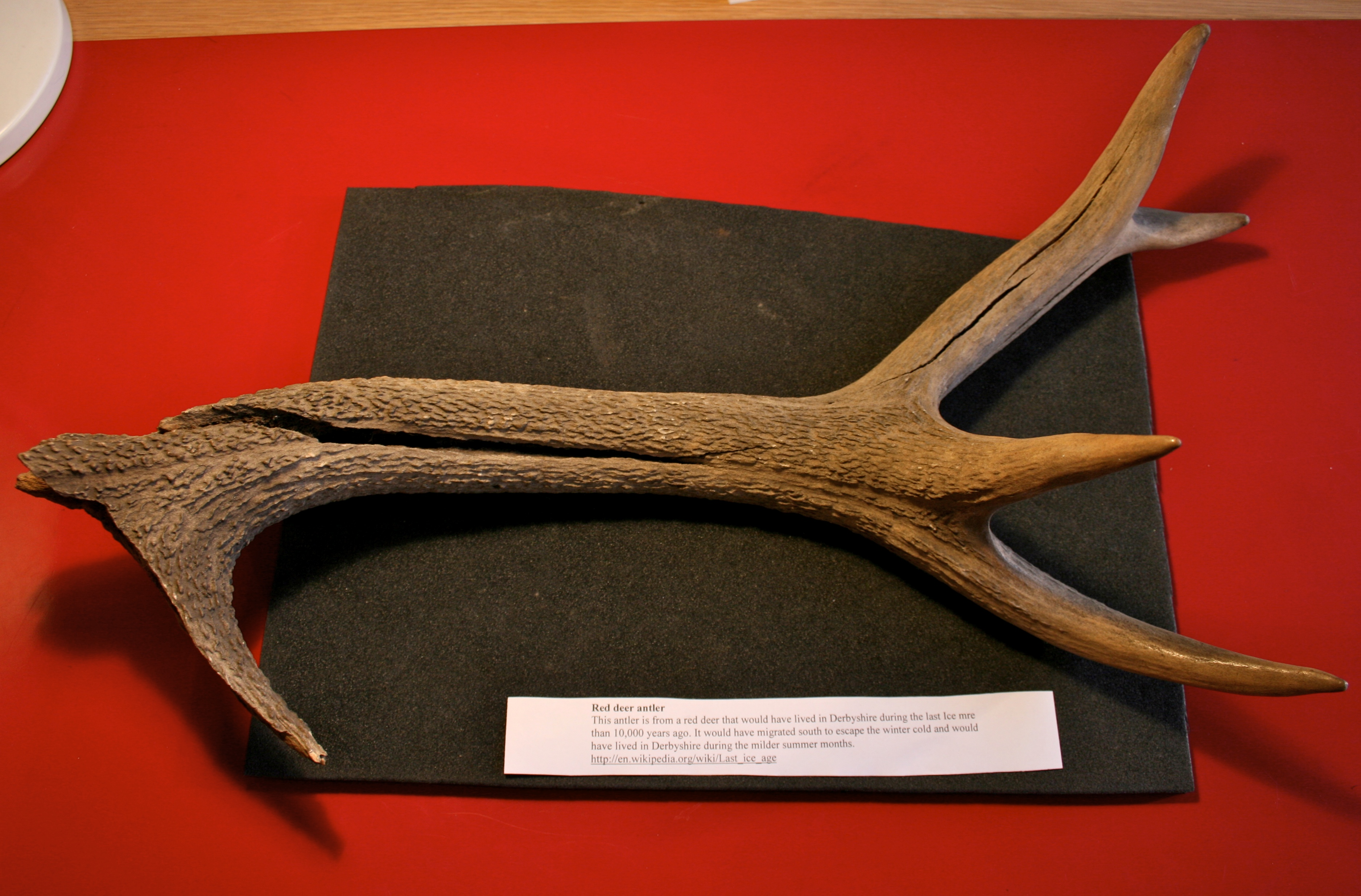
Stag horns were supposedly used as nails in construction of the Gwennan Gorn

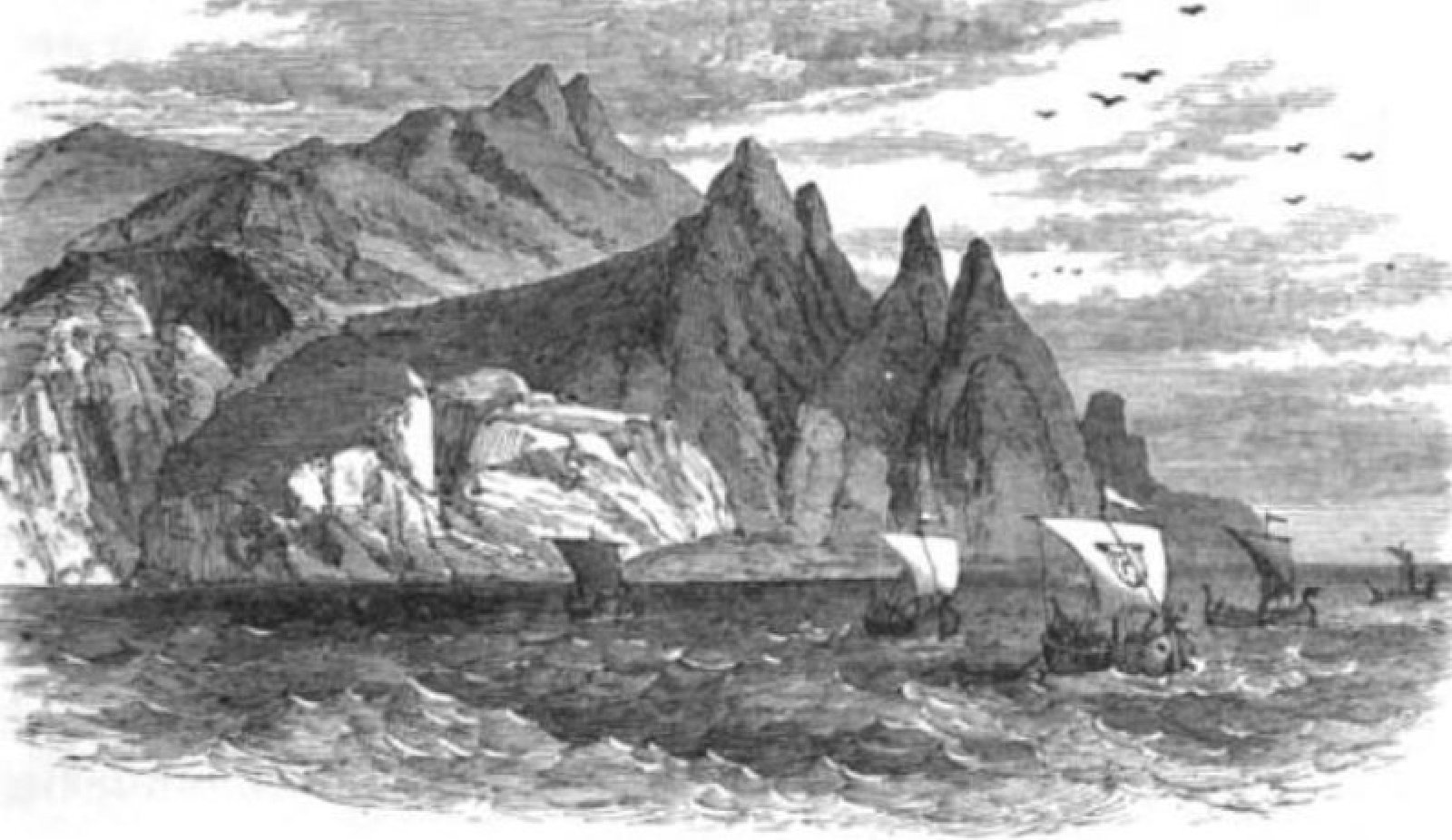
Depiction of Madoc leaving Wales with his ship the Gwennan Gorn leading a fleet; from W. C. Bryant's 1888 A Popular History of the United States

The name Gwennan Gorn (or Gwennangorn) is given to a ship reportedly designed and built by a sea-voyager named Madog ab Owain Gwynedd in a document by Welsh copyist and collector Roger Morris written in the 1580s. According to this document:

Madog ab Owain Gwynedd was a great sea-voyager and eager to travel and because he could by no other means enter the Sugnedd, (Note: generally translates at "quagmire") he did make and build a ship without iron, but nailed it with stag's horn so that that sea would not swallow her; and called her Gwenangorn [the white one of horn] because of the way she was made; and in her he sailed the seas at his pleasure and travelled to many lands across the sea without any fear, but on returning home, near Bardsey the currents (ffirydie) shook her cruelly and threw her far off course and for this reason that place in the sea has ever since been called Ffrydie Caswenan. This story came from one hand to another under credible guarantee down to this day. So it was told to me by Edward ap Sion Wynn the 13 of March 1582.

Ceridwen Lloyd-Morgan discusses 18th-century tales stating that King Arthur was said to have had a ship named Gwennan which was wrecked on a dangerous sandbank off Bardsey in an area of the sea called Caswennan.

Lloyd-Morgan also wrote that "The fact that Roger Morris, who acquired the story of Madog two years before the publication of Powel's work, does not refer to the discovery of America nor to a number of details in the later Madog tradition suggest that these were not known to him."

== Bibliography ==
- Lloyd-Morgan, Ceridwen (2004). Arthurian Literature Xxi: Celtic Arthurian Material. DS Brewer. ISBN 978-1-84384-028-2.
