= João Vaz Corte-Real =

Portuguese (c. 1420 – 1496)

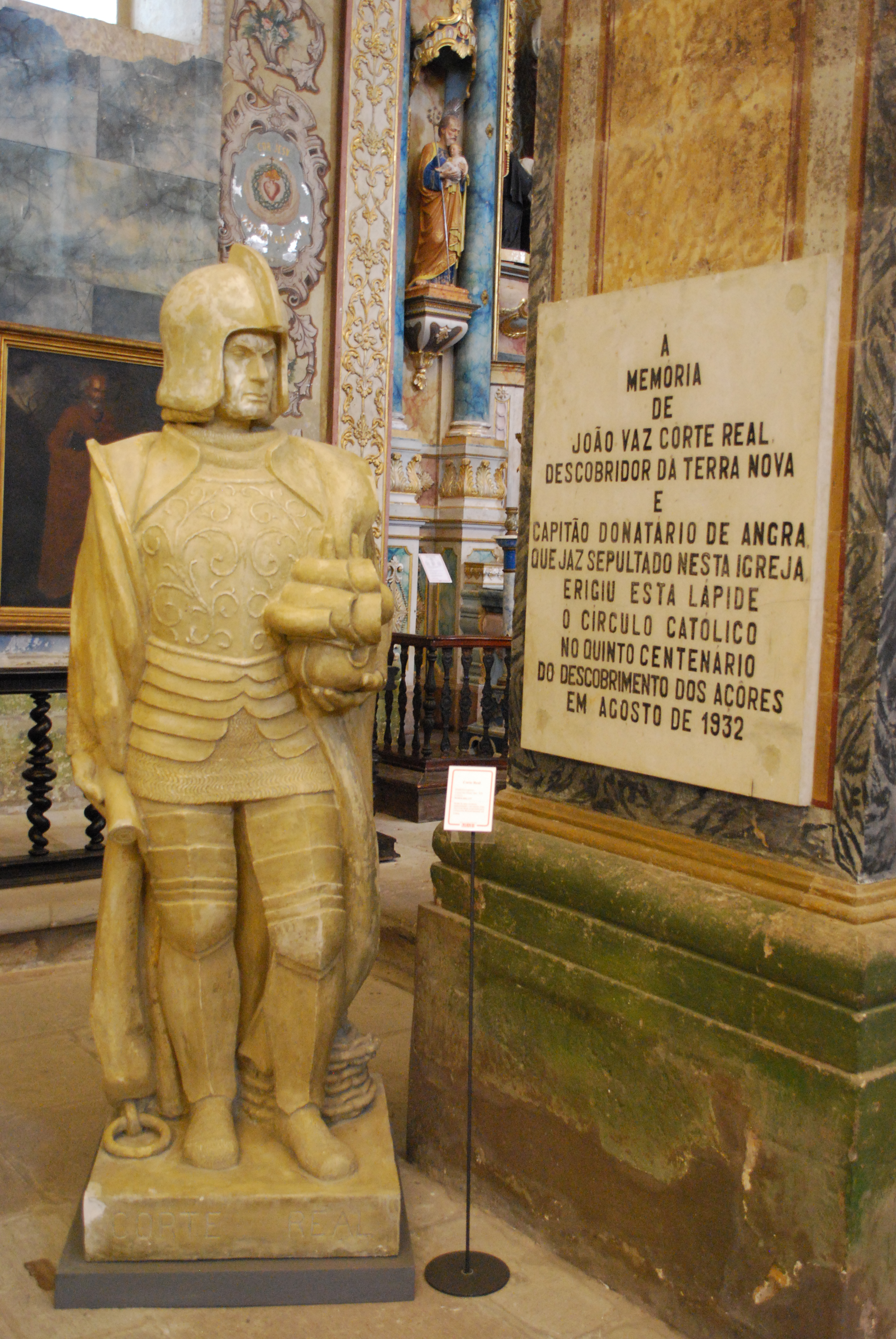
- Statue of João Vaz Corte-Real on display at the Museu de Angra do Heroísmo, Azores

1st Captain-Donatário of Angra
- In office 1474–1496
- Monarchs: Alphonso V; John II; Emmanuel I
- Preceded by: Jácome de Bruges
- Succeeded by: Vasco Anes Corte-Real
- Constituency: Angra

1st Captain-Donatário of São Jorge
- In office 1474–1496
- Succeeded by: Vasco Anes Corte-Real
- Constituency: São Jorge

Personal details
- Pronunciation: Portuguese pronunciation: [ʒuˈɐ̃w vaʃ ˈkoɾtɨ ʁiˈal]
- Born: João Vaz Corte-Real; 1420
- Died: 1496 (aged 75–76)
- Citizenship: Kingdom of Portugal
- Spouse: Maria de Abarca
- Children: Miguel Corte-Real; Vasco Anes Corte-Real; Gaspar Corte-Real

João Vaz Corte-Real (c. 1420 – 1496) was a Portuguese sailor, claimed by some accounts to have been an explorer of a land called Terra Nova do Bacalhau (New Land of the Codfish), speculated to possibly have been a part of North America. These accounts assert that Corte-Real was awarded the donatário–captaincies of São Jorge and Angra for his accomplishments, but contemporary documents contradict this claim.

== Biography ==
A member of the Corte-Real family, João Vaz was the father of Miguel and Gaspar Corte-Real, whom some claim accompanied him on his voyage. Fragmentary evidence suggests the expedition in 1473 was a joint venture between the kings of Portugal and Denmark, and that Corte-Real accompanied the German sailors Didrik Pining and Hans Pothorst, as well as (the possibly mythical) John Scolvus.

The claim that he discovered Terra Nova do Bacalhau (literally, New Land of the Codfish) originated from Gaspar Frutuoso's book Saudades de terra from around 1570–80. There is speculation that this otherwise unidentified isle was Newfoundland. Frutuoso further suggested that Corte-Real was granted part of Terceira because of this discovery. This is contradicted by contemporary documents which state the grant was made for "expenses he had incurred" and "services rendered", with no mention of any discoveries. Because of the lack of corroborating evidence, the claims of discovery remain entirely speculative.

=== Donatário ===
It is known that Corte-Real was originally granted the island of São Jorge in the archipelago of the Azores in 1472, which he held until 1474. From this point onward he was granted the captaincy of Angra on Terceira by the Infanta Beatrice, Duchess of Viseu, and approved by the King, following the disappearance of Jacome de Bruges. Bruges was the original Captain-Donatário, but following his disappearance, the King had divided the island between Angra and Praia, granting Praia to Álvaro Martins Homem, while Corte-Real obtained Angra. He took-up residence in the burgh and set about promoting its settlement, but the division of the island into two Captaincies did not assist the island's growth.

=== Later life ===
Corte-Real and his wife, Maria de Abarca, were buried in the presbytery of the church of the Convent of São Francisco. His descendants did not live in the Capitania of Angra, instead sending ouvidores, magistrates, to the territory to administer the possessions.

== See also ==
- Timeline of the European colonization of North America
- Didrik Pining
- Álvaro Martins
