= Hans Pothorst =

German-Danish sailor and privateer (c. 1440 – 1490)

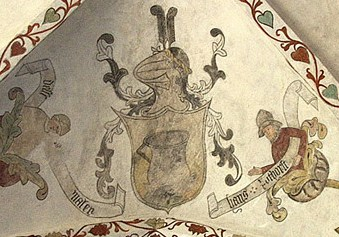
Helsingør church painting of Hans Pothorst and his coat of arms, c. 1493. The banner held by the man to the right says Hans Pothorst, and the one to the left says Dellf maler ("Dellf painter").

Hans Pothorst (c. 1440 – 1490) was a privateer, likely from the German city of Hildesheim.

In 1925, researcher Sofus Larsen proposed that Pothhorst may have landed in North America, along with Didrik Pining, in the 1470s, almost twenty years before Columbus' voyages of discovery. Scholars now view this as unlikely.

== Biography ==
In what little is known about Pothorst, he is often linked with Didrik Pining. Like Pining, Pothorst was likely from Hildesheim. Pothorst's service on the Hamburg warship Bastian seems to have been officially terminated on 1 July 1473. Sometime in the 1470s, Pining, Pothorst and Corte-Real were sent by King Christian I of Denmark on a naval expedition to the North-Atlantic. During the later years of the reign of Christian I, Pothorst and Pining are said to have distinguished themselves "not less as capable seamen than as matchless freebooters."

Pothorst's home in Denmark is presumed to have been Helsingør, where his coat of arms and a simple portrait were painted (possibly shortly after his death) among eight ceiling frescoes in the local St. Mary's Church. The ceiling ensemble remains one of the most celebrated 15th century Danish artworks, and if Pothorst funded its creation as it has been assumed, historians note that he must have been rather wealthy.

Later, he is mentioned as a privateer, and in the Skibby Chronicle, Pothorst and Pining are mentioned among many pirates who "met with a miserable death, being either slain by their friends or hanged on the gallows or drowned in the waves of the sea."

== See also ==
- João Vaz Corte-Real

== Sources ==
- Hughes, Thomas L. (2004). ""The German Discovery of America": A Review of the Controversy over Pining's 1473 Voyage of Exploration". German Studies Review. 27 (3): 503–526. doi:10.2307/4140980. ISSN 0149-7952. JSTOR 4140980.
- Nansen, Fridtjof; Chater, Arthur G. (1911), In Northern Mists: Arctic Exploration in Early Times, Frederick A. Stokes co., pp. 124–129
