= Álvaro Martins =

15th-century Portuguese explorer

- Álvaro Martins Homem
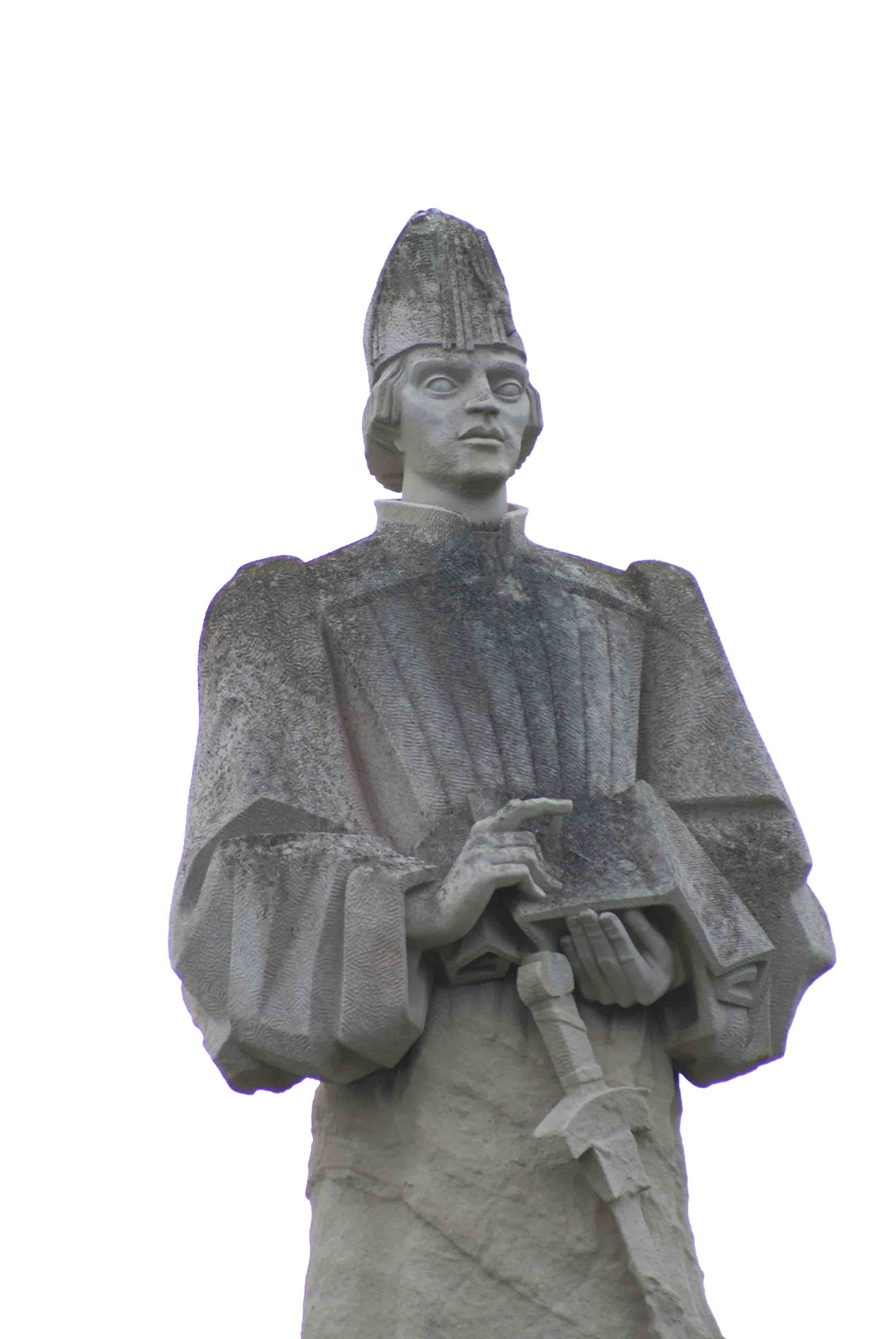
- Álvaro Martins statue in Angra do Heroísmo

2nd Captain-Donatário of Praia
- In office 17 February 1474 – 1483
- Monarchs: Afonso V; John II
- Preceded by: Jácome de Bruges
- Succeeded by: Antão Martins Homem
- Constituency: Praia

Personal details
- Born: Álvaro Martins Homem
- Citizenship: Kingdom of Portugal

Álvaro Martins, also known as Álvaro Martins Homem, was a 15th-century Portuguese explorer alleged to have explored the western Atlantic and later the African coast. He is claimed to have accompanied João Vaz Corte-Real on an undocumented expedition to Terra Nova do Bacalhau (literally, "New Land of the Codfish") in the early 1470s, by Gaspar Frutuoso in his 1570s book Saudades da Terra.

It is known that Álvaro Martins was granted the captaincy of Praia, in the Portuguese archipelago of the Azores, on 17 February 1474 for his services to Infante Ferdinand, Duke of Viseu, an office he held for some years. It was following the disappearance of Jacome de Bruges that the King divided the island between Angra and Praia, granting Praia to Álvaro Martins, while João Vaz Corte-Real obtained the Captaincy of Angra. Álvaro Martins and his son (Antão) were responsible for the fortifications, and the development of agriculture and commerce in northern Terceira.

He is also said to have accompanied Bartolomeu Dias on his journey around the Cape of Good Hope from 1487 to 1488.
