= Anders Square =

Garden square in Szczecin, Poland

General Władysław Anders Square
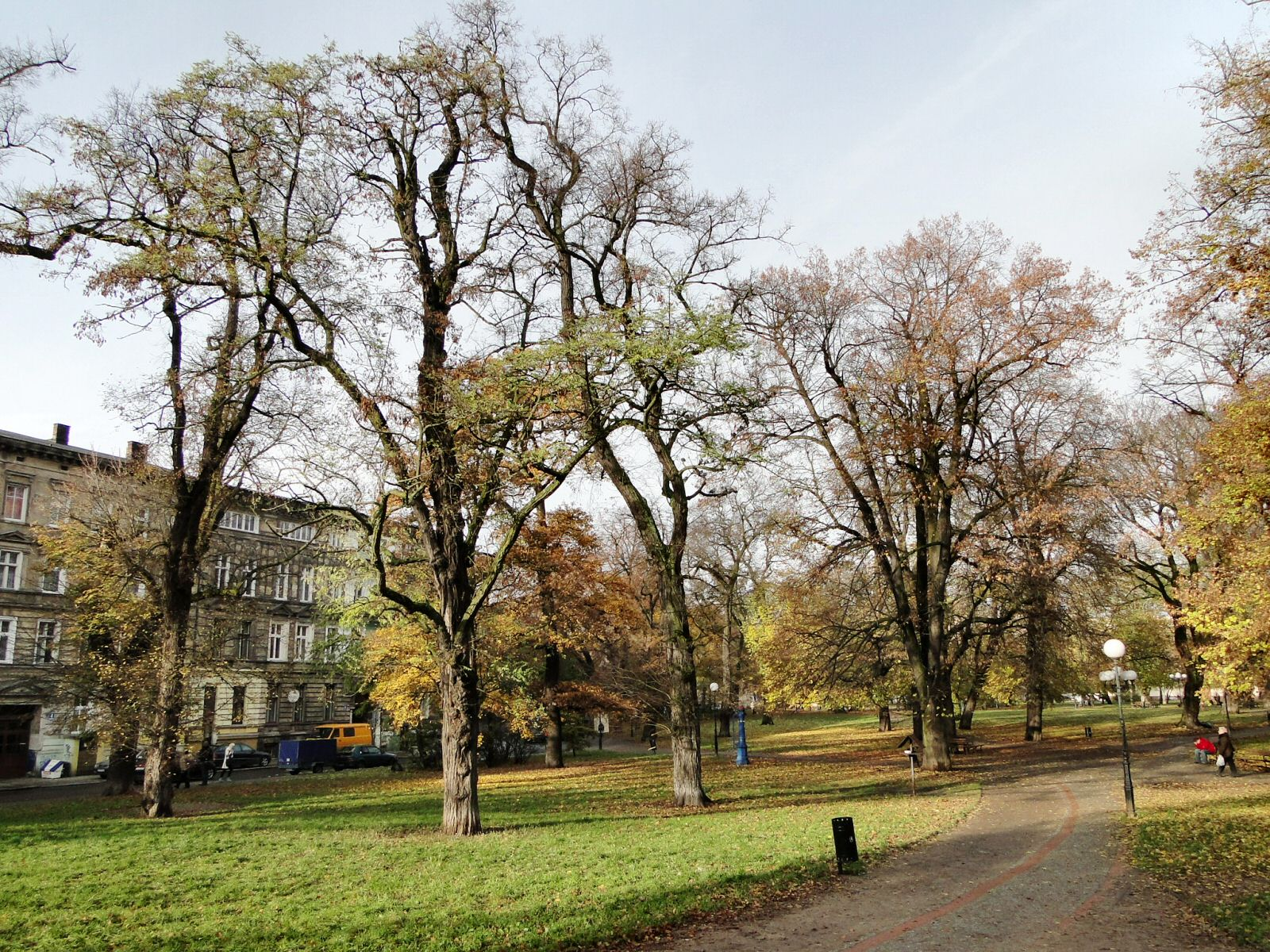
- The garden square in 2009.
- Interactive map of General Władysław Anders Square
- Type: Garden square
- Location: Szczecin, Poland
- Coordinates: 53°25′38″N 14°32′51″E
- Created: 1945

General Władysław Anders Square (Polish pronunciation: [vwaˈdɘ̟.swaf ˈan.dɛrs]; Polish: Plac gen. Władysława Andersa), also known as General Władysław Anders Park (Polish: Park gen. Władysława Andersa), is a garden square in Szczecin, Poland, in the neighbourhood of Centrum, within the Downtown district. It is located between Więckowskiego, Śląska, Bałuki, Św. Wojciecha Streets, and the Victory Square. The area was originally founded in 1846 as a military cemetery, which was eventually closed for burials in the 1900s, and torn down and turned in a garden square in 1945. To the south, it borders the Church of the Holiest Heart of Our Lord, a modernist Roman Catholic parish church dating to 1919, with the elements of Baroque Revival and Romanesque Revival architectural elements.

== History ==
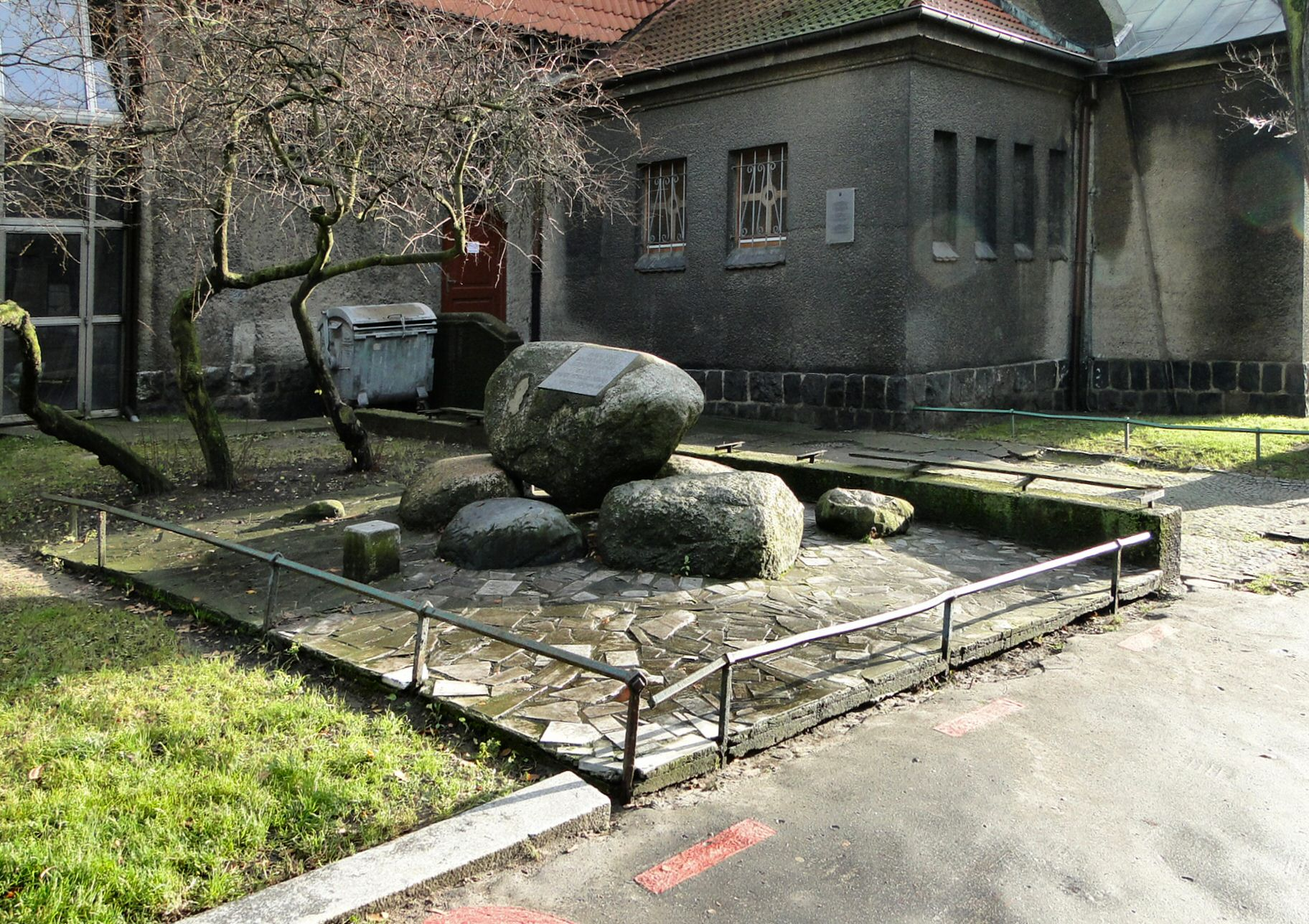
The memorial to the victims of a prisoner-of-war camp of the Franco-Prussian War, which forms the last relict after the former cemetery located in place of the Anders Square.

On 25 March 1846, a cemetery was founded on the premises of Fort William, being dedicated to the burials of its soldiers. It was originally referred to as the Garrison Churchyard (German: Garnison Kirchhof), and later became known as the Old Military Cemetery (German: Alter Militärfriedhof, Alter Militär Kirchhof). Originally, it reached to the Victory Square to the north, and was later additionally expanded to the northwest.

In 1871, 104 soldiers of the French Army, who died in the prisoner-of-war camp, located outside the city, during the Franco-Prussian War. In 1877, Friedrich Graf von Wrangel (1784–1877), a general field marshal of the Prussian Army, was buried at the cemetery, being the most notable people to be laid there.

Following the deconstruction of Fort William in 1886, the city had planned a new road layout in the area. The current Bogurodzicy Street was extended to Św. Wojciecha Street, while it in turn was extended to the Victory Square. To accommodate those changes, the eastern part of the cemetery was demolished. In 1890, St. John the Baptist Basilica was built next to the cemetery, and in 1893, the Obstetrics Institute (now a children's hospital) was opened nearby.

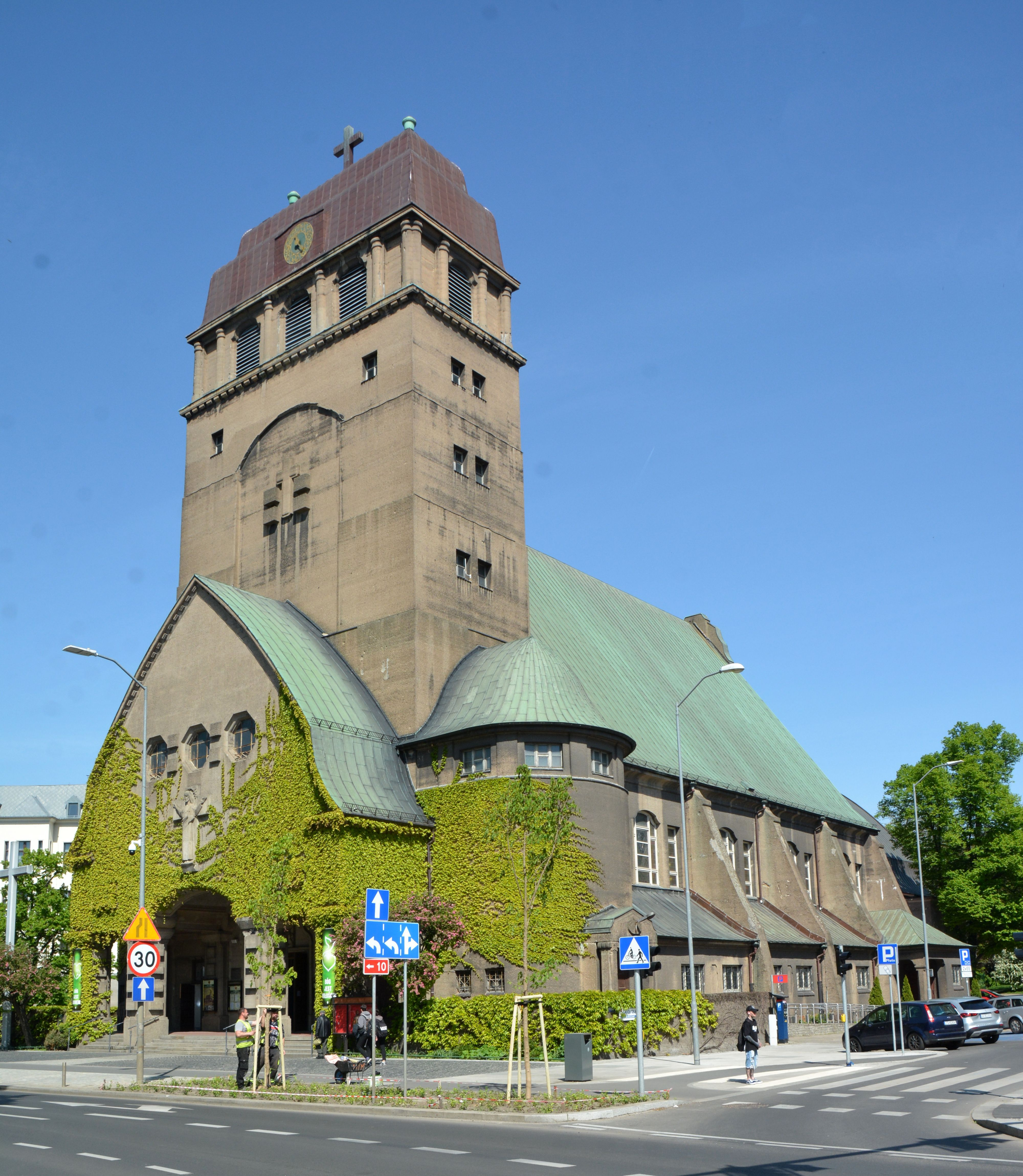
The Church of the Holiest Heart of Our Lord, built in 1919.

The cemetery was closed for new burials around the year 1900. In 1906, the southern portion of the cemetery was removed, to make room for the construction of the Church of the Holiest Heart of Our Lord, which lasted from 1913 to 1919. It was built in the modernist style with the elements of the Baroque Revival and Romanesque Revival architectural elements, and originally served as the temple for the military garrison. Over 500 graves were relocated to the remaining part of the cemetery. By 1914, most graves were removed altogether, with only those in its central portion, including the ones belonging to the Wrangel family, remaining. Currently, the memorial to the prisoners of war is the only remaining relict of the cemetery.

Following the end of the Second World War, the Church of the Holiest Heart of Our Lord became the first church to be reopened in the city, being adopted into a Roman Catholic civilian parish church. The remaining gravestones were removed from the cemetery in 1945, without conducting exhumations, and the area was redeveloped into a garden square. It became known as the Ledóchowski Street Square (Polish: Plac przy Ledóchowskiego), which in turn was named after Mieczysław Halka-Ledóchowski, a 19th-century Catholic cleric served as the archbishop of Gdniezno and Poznań, and the primate of Poland. On 20 December 1949, it was renamed to the 22nd of July Square (Polish: Plac 22 Lipca), after the National Day of the Rebirth of Poland, an annual state holiday held annually on said date. It was renamed to its current name on 27 May 1991, in honour of Władysław Anders, a 20th-century military officer and general in the Polish Armed Forces and the commander of the Anders's Army.

In October 1972, a sculpture by Leonia Chmielnik, titled The Children, was placed at the square. Made from the artificial stone, it takes form of two statues of children, a boy and a girl, standing against each other's backs.

On 19 May 2012, a bench monument, was unveiled at the garden square. It features a brass statue of Jan Czekanowski, an anthropologist, statistician, ethnographer, traveller, and linguist, who was one of the first persons to use quantitative methods in linguistics. It was designed by Yossouf Toure "Derme", and made in his workshop in Ouagadougou, Burkina Faso.

== Characteristics ==
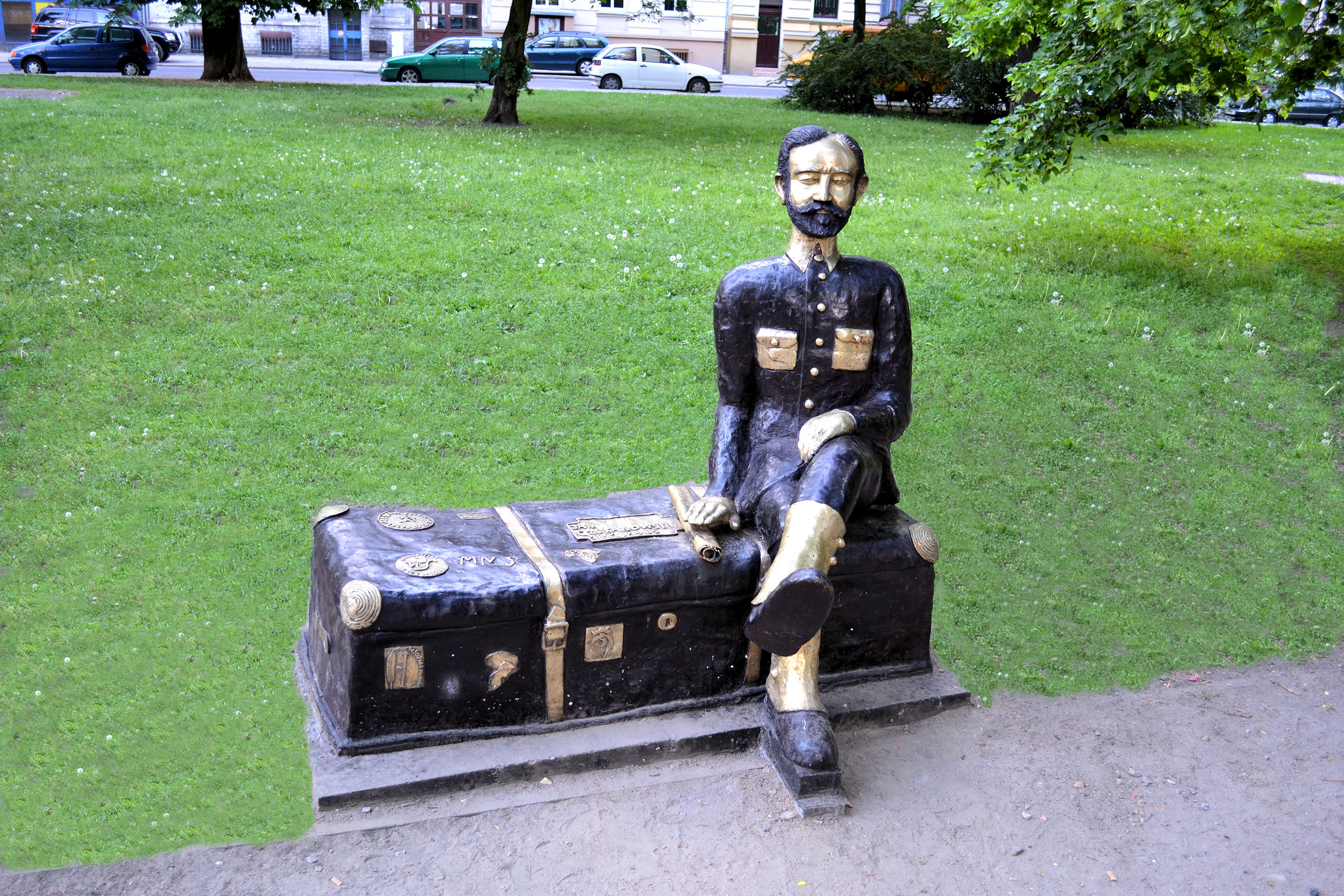
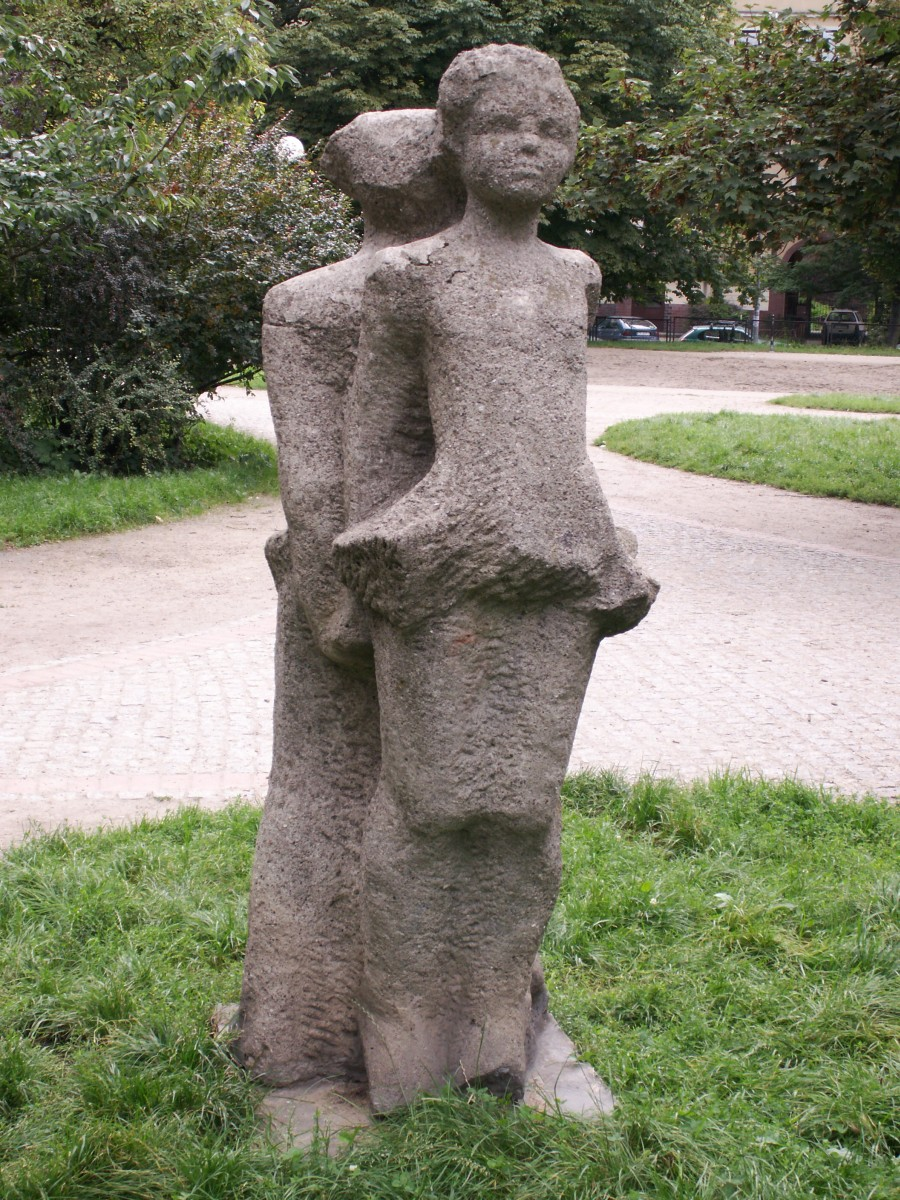
The statue of Jan Czekanowski by Yossouf Toure "Derme" (on the left), and the sculpture The Children by Leonia Chmielnik (on the right).

The garden square is placed between Więckowskiego, Śląska, Bałuki, Św. Wojciecha Streets, and the Victory Square, and surrounded by tenements. In the east, it borders the Church of the Holiest Heart of Our Lord, a modernist Roman Catholic parish church dating to 1919, with the elements of Baroque Revival and Romanesque Revival architectural elements. A memorial dedicated to the soldiers of the French Army, who died between 1870 and 1871, in the local prisoner-of-war camp during the Franco-Prussian War. It takes form of a pile of rocks with a commemorative plaque. The Anders Square also features a brass bench monument with statue of Jan Czekanowski, an anthropologist, statistician, ethnographer, traveller, and linguist, who was one of the first persons to use quantitative methods in linguistics. It was designed by Yossouf Toure "Derme". Additionally, it also includes the 1972 artificial stone sculpture by Leonia Chmielnik, titled The Children. It takes form of two statues of children, a boy and a girl, standing against each other's backs.
