= Statue of Jan Czekanowski =

2012 brass sculpture in Szczecin, Poland

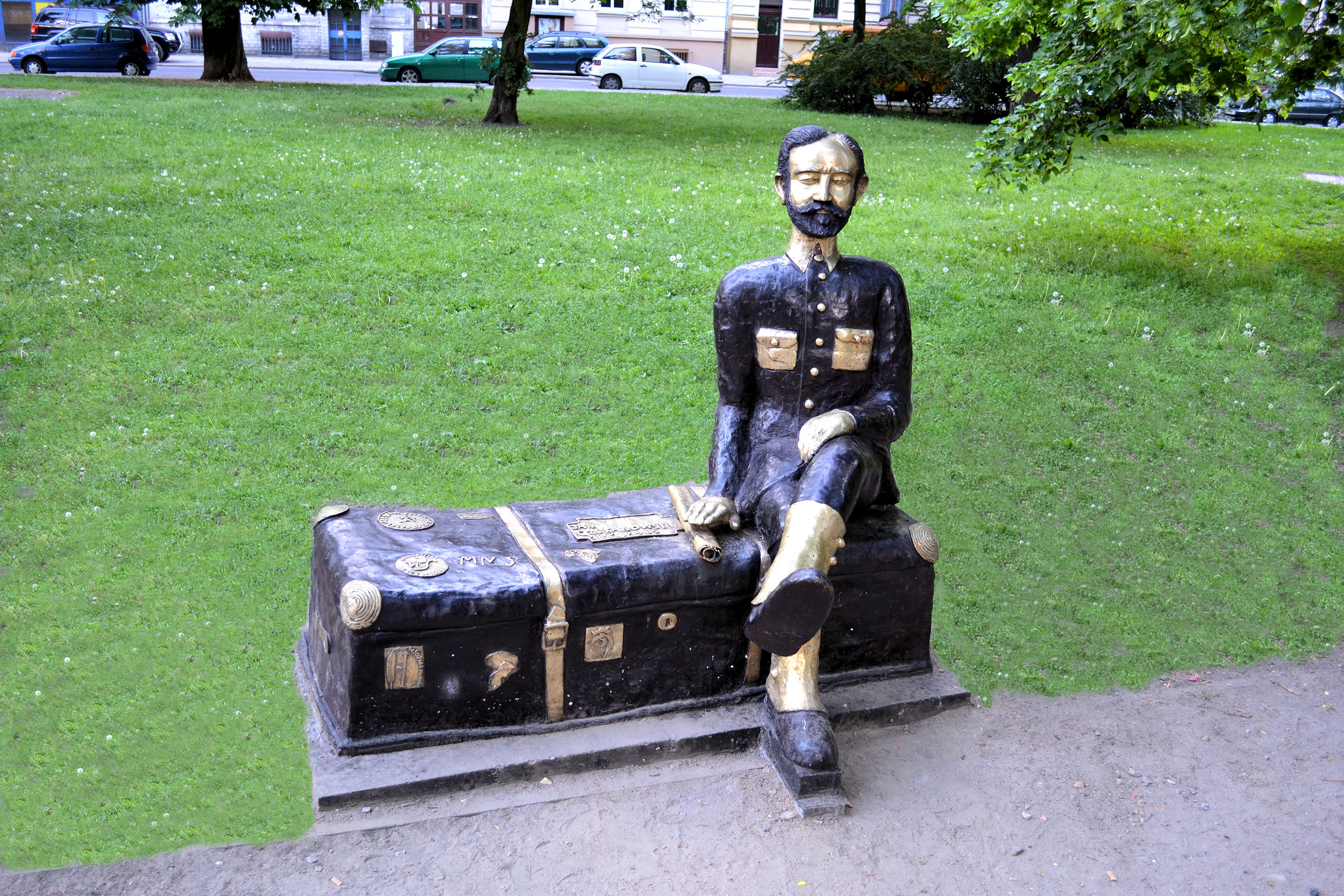
- The sculpture in 2012.
- Interactive map of Statue of Jan Czekanowski
- Location: Anders Square, Szczecin, Poland
- Coordinates: 53°25′38.1″N 14°32′51.2″E
- Designer: Yossouf Toure "Derme"
- Type: Statue, bench monument
- Material: Brass
- Opening date: 19 May 2012
- Dedicated to: Jan Czekanowski

The statue of Jan Czekanowski (Polish pronunciation: [ˈjan t͡ʂɛ.kaˈnɔf.ski]; Polish: Pomnik Jana Czekanowskiego) is a brass sculpture in Szczecin, Poland, placed at the Anders Square, within the Centre neighbourhood of the Downtown district. It is dedicated to Jan Czekanowski, an anthropologist, statistician, ethnographer, traveller, and linguist, who was one of the first persons to use quantitative methods in linguistics. The sculpture has a form of a statue sitting on a large suitcase, forming a bench. It was designed by sculptor Yossouf Toure "Derme" based in Ouagadougou, Burkina Faso, and unveiled on 19 May 2012.

== History ==
The monument was commitioned to commemorate Jan Czekanowski, an anthropologist, statistician, ethnographer, traveller, and linguist, who was one of the first persons to use quantitative methods in linguistics, and who spent last years of his life in Szczecin. It was financed via donations from various organizations and people, including University of Szczecin, Szczecin City Hall, and Polish Africanist Society. The sculpture was designed by Yossouf Toure "Derme", and made in his workshop in Ouagadougou, Burkina Faso. It was unveiled on 19 May 2012.

== Design ==
The monument is made from brass and has a form of a statue of Jan Czekanowski, wearing a late 19th-century attire associated with European explorers in Africa. He is depicted sitting with crossed legs, on the left side of a long suitcase, featuring logos of various donner organizations, imitating travel stamps. The sculpture has form of a bench. The monument is painted in black and gold colours.
