= Głuchów, Grójec County =

Głuchów
- Village
- Location within Poland
- Coordinates: 51°55′N 20°51′E
- Country: Poland
- Voivodeship: Masovian
- County: Grójec
- Gmina: Grójec
- Time zone: UTC+1 (CET)
  - Summer (DST): UTC+2 (CEST)
- Vehicle registration: WGR

Głuchów [ˈɡwuxuf] is a village in the administrative district of Gmina Grójec, within Grójec County, Masovian Voivodeship, in east-central Poland.

== History ==
In the early modern period, a trade route connecting Warsaw and Kraków ran through the village. It was one of the busiest routes in Poland.

== Notable residents ==
- Jan Czekanowski (1882–1965), anthropologist, statistician, ethnographer, traveller, and linguist
