= William Edgar Geil =

Traveling evangelist

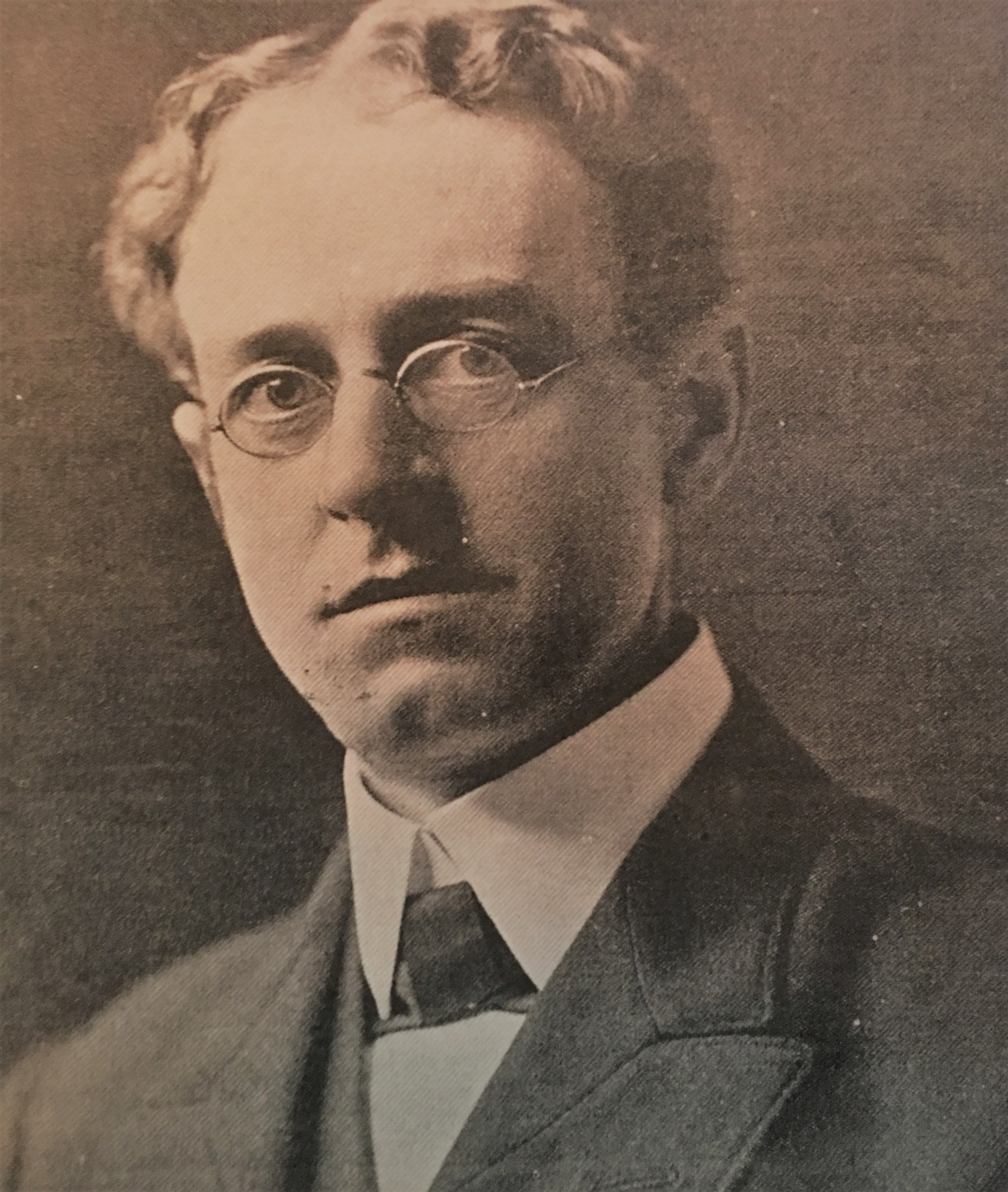
William Edgar Geil, Age 37

William Edgar Geil (October 1, 1865, in New Britain, Pennsylvania – April 11, 1925, in Venice) was an unordained evangelist, explorer, lecturer, photographer, and author of 10 books related to his travels. He lectured all over the world, illustrating his talks with lantern slides. He is believed to be the first American to have traveled the entire length of the 2,500-kilometer-long Ming section of the Great Wall of China. He visited the Five Sacred Mountains of China, about which he wrote in The Sacred 5 of China. He came to be considered an expert in Chinese culture and religion.

== Early years and education ==
William Edgar Geil was born on October 1, 1865, in New Britain, Pennsylvania on his family farm. Geil moved to nearby Doylestown, Pennsylvania, where he acquired his education at the public schools, the Doylestown English and Classical Seminary, and Lafayette College, Easton, Pennsylvania, where he attended briefly but never completed graduation. At an early age Geil manifested a deep interest in religious matters and became an earnest and active member of the church. An indefatigable student, he became thoroughly versed in the Scriptures as well as in most of the important sacred literature, ancient and modern.

== Career ==
=== Orator and evangelistic work ===
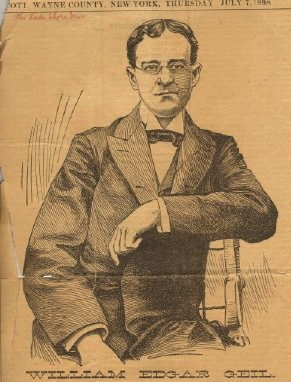
Dr. William Edgar Geil, 1898 from the Lake Shore News, Wayne County, New York

After leaving college, where he was famous as an orator, he engaged in evangelistic work, with credentials from the Doylestown church, and soon after made several trips to Europe. Geil visited Egypt, the Holy Land, and many of the ancient cities of the Mediterranean. Returning to America, Geil again engaged in evangelistic work. He then began his life work in religion with success and acclaim. He held revival meetings in various parts of New Jersey, New York and New England, and later made a tour of the south and west, addressing meetings of thousands of hearers and making thousands of converts. The Cincinnati Enquirer said of him: "His success has been more pronounced than that of any evangelist since Moody;" and the Lowell (Mass.) Citizen said that the meetings conducted by him were "the most remarkable series of meetings ever held in this city."

=== Isle of Patmos and Return to the Middle East ===
In 1896 he made another extended trip abroad, revisiting the Holy Land and its ancient environs, and many of the ancient towns of Asia Minor, and the Mediterranean. Among other points he visited the Isle of Patmos, and on his return wrote and published his book, "The Isle that is called Patmos," which reached a sale of many thousands, and was rewritten, enlarged and republished in 1904, after his second visit to the island, in that year. The alarming illness of his mother, to whose early training he says he owes most of his success, called him home in the early part of 1897, and soon after closing the eyes of his beloved parent in her last sleep, on May 2, 1897, he returned to Europe for a brief sojourn and then again took up his work in his native country with increased success.

== The Great World Wide Tour ==
=== Purpose ===
On April 29, 1901, William Edgar Geil left on four-year trip around the world he self dubbed "The Great World Wide Tour". Geil wanted the United States to observe the state and conditions of missionaries around the world. The Great World Wide Tour's purpose was as best described by his pastor, as an "... independent observation of the whole missionary field, in its actual condition, operations, modes of organization, instruction and efforts, its different peculiarities, its needs, its difficulties, its relation to existing heathen religion, to international and denominational policies of political events; and what encouragement or discouragement may exist in the great work of extending the gospel to the world, and especially to the neglected parts of heathendom. A special object is to visit schools, colleges and institutions of sacred learning in connection with missionary operations and report the results to the whole Christian church." During this four-year trip Geil would use photography, notes, and maps to interact with the various peoples and cultures of the world. His three books Ocean and Isle (1902), Yankee on the Yangtze (1904), and A Yankee in Pigmy land ( 1905) would capture his stories and experiences of his travels during the Great World Wide Tour.

=== Ocean and Isle (1901–02) ===
Leaving Philadelphia on April 29, 1901, he crossed the continent to California, and, sailing from the Golden Gate for the Sandwich and South Sea Islands, visiting the Hawaii, Samoa, Fiji, and many other regions in Oceania, and noting their condition and work, as well as the condition and characteristics of their indigenous populations. Geil also focused on the relations between governmental and commercial matters to the propagation of the Gospel of Christ. He proceeded thence to New Zealand, and Australia, reaching Sydney in November 1901, and in Melbourne the following April and May, he organized and participated in the greatest religious revival the continent has ever known, speaking daily to audiences of 3,000 at noon and 10,000 at night during "The Great Melbourne Mission". The first part of Geil's Great World Wide Tour is described in his book Ocean and Isle.

=== Yankee on the Yangtze ( Mid 1902 – early 1903) ===
From Australia he proceeded to New Guinea, the Philippines and Japan in late 1901. Throughout 1902, Geil made an extensive trip through China, going up the Yangtze river in a native gunboat, and was carried over the mountains of western China in a bamboo mountain chair. Geil also very visited Manchuria, Korea and Siberia, and later traveled extensively in Burma. While on the Yangtze river, he visited English, American, Australian, and Belgian missionaries in China and also became fascinated with Chinese culture as a whole. On the Chinese people, Geil stated that "The better qualities of the Chinese are shown by their ability to do good. There were great charities and benevolent institutions in China before Columbus discovered America". The second part of Geil's Great World Wide Tour and his first journey through China along the Yangtze is described in Yankee on the Yangtze.

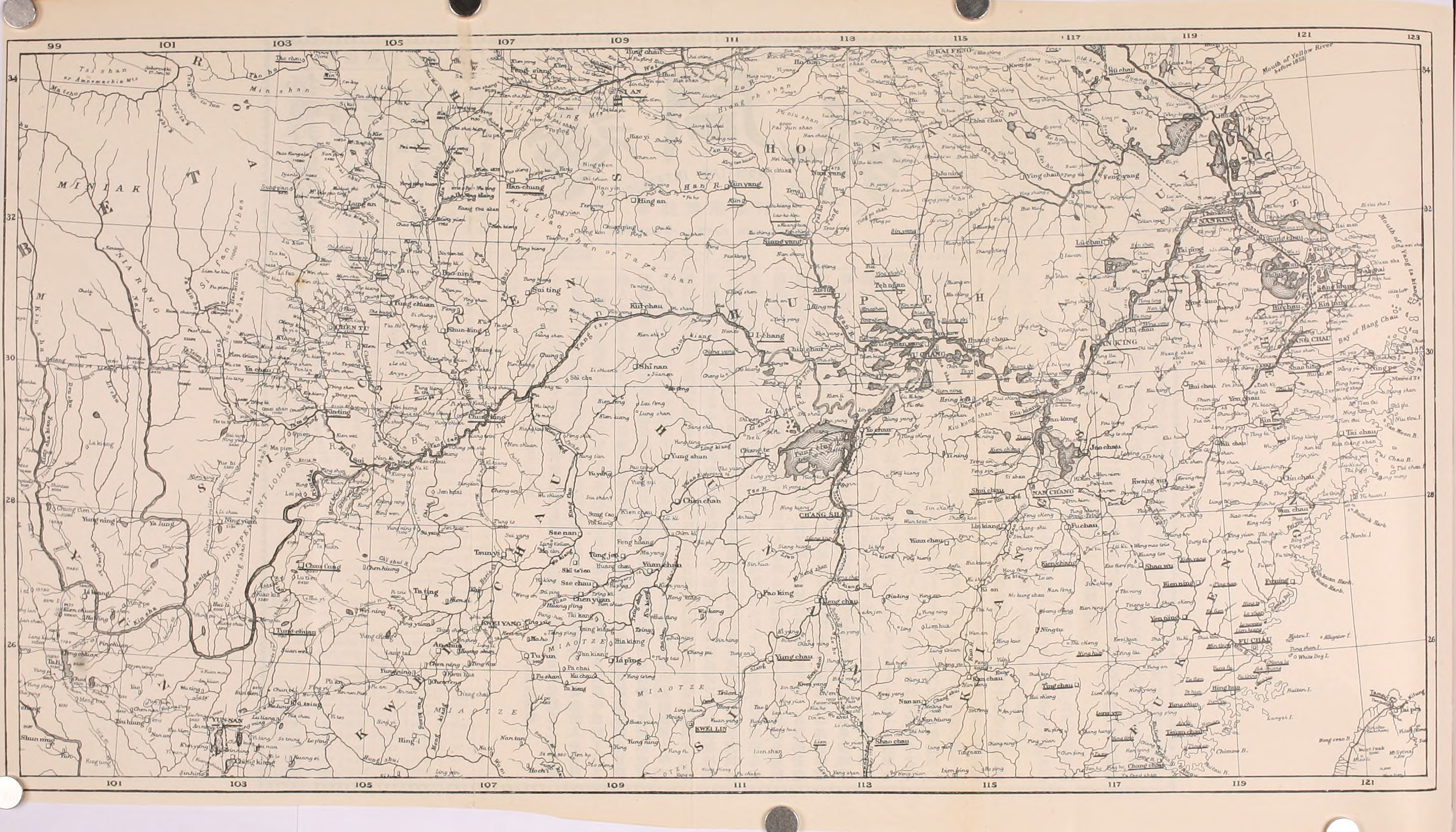
Map of Dr. Geil's journey along the Yangtze River (1902)

=== Yankee in pigmy land ( Late 1903) ===
The last part of Geil's Great World Wide Tour was across Africa from Mombasa on the eastern coast to the Pigmy Forest, and thence down the Congo River to the western coast. The journey across equatorial Africa was around 2,500 miles and lasted from June to January 1904. The conclusion of his Great World Wide Tour and description of Geil's time in equatorial Africa can be found in Yankee in Pigmy Land.

== Return Trips To China ==
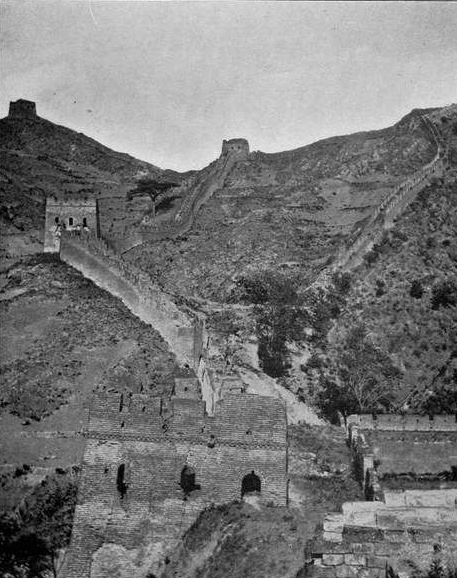
Photo of the Great Wall taken by Dr. Geil

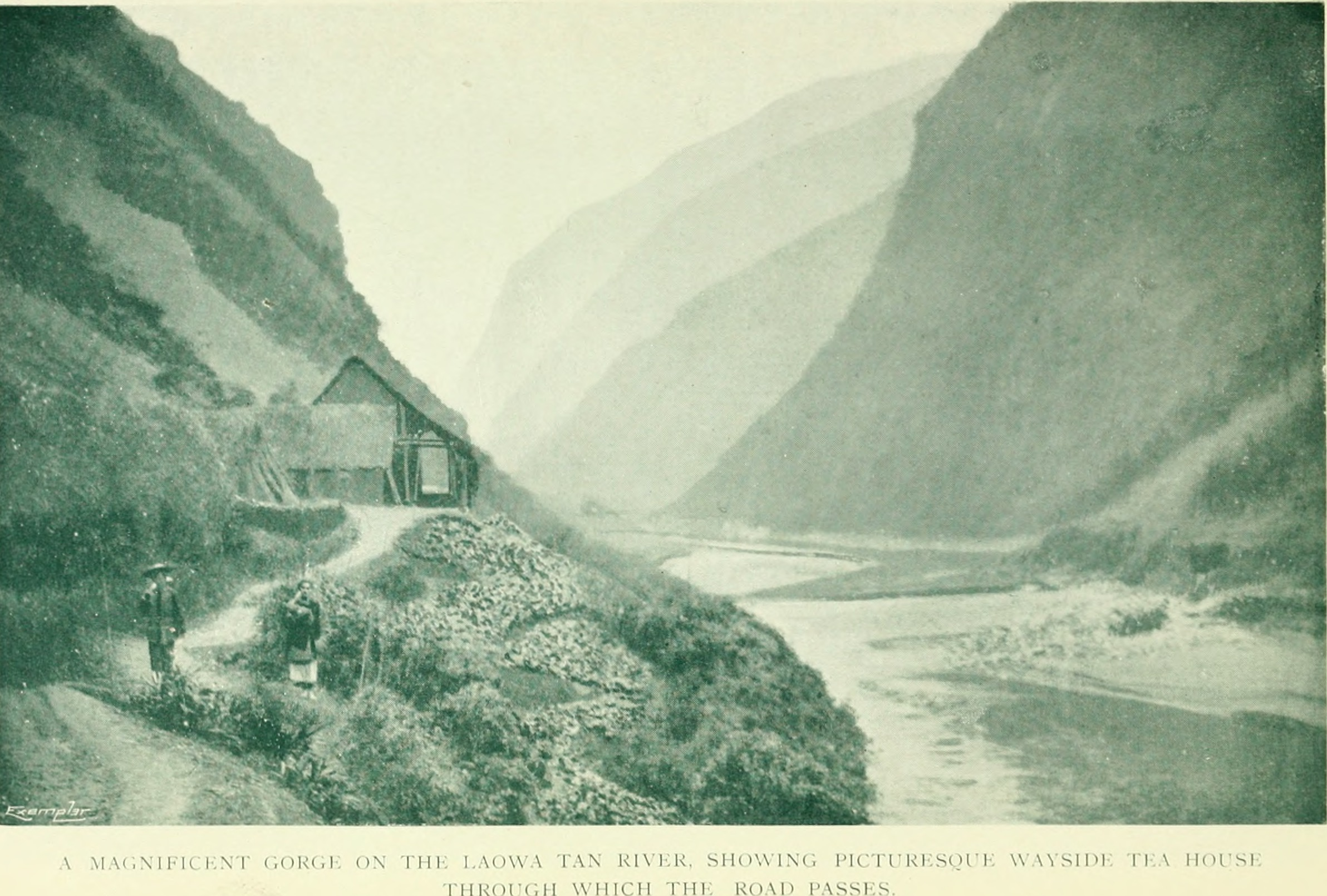

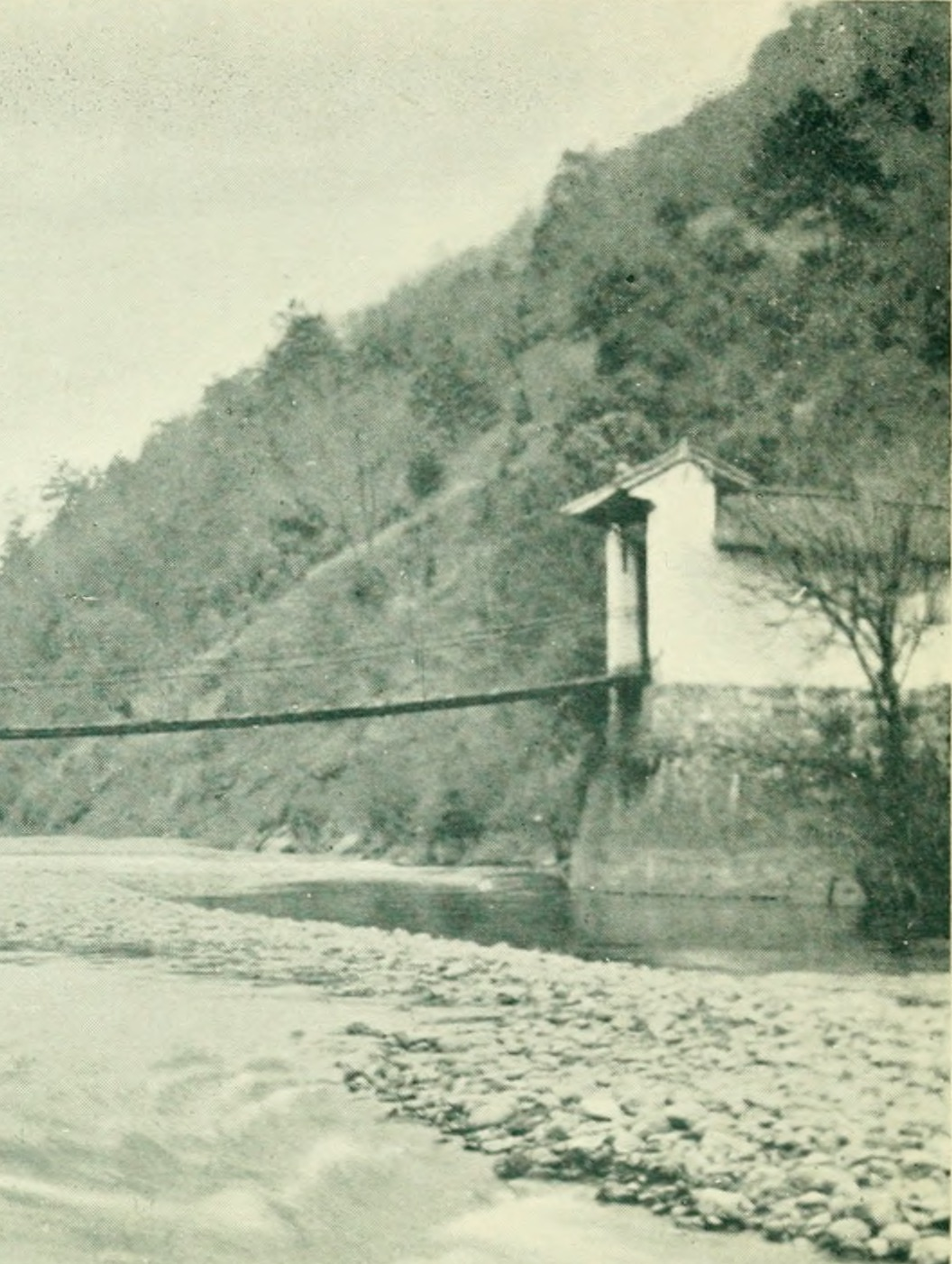

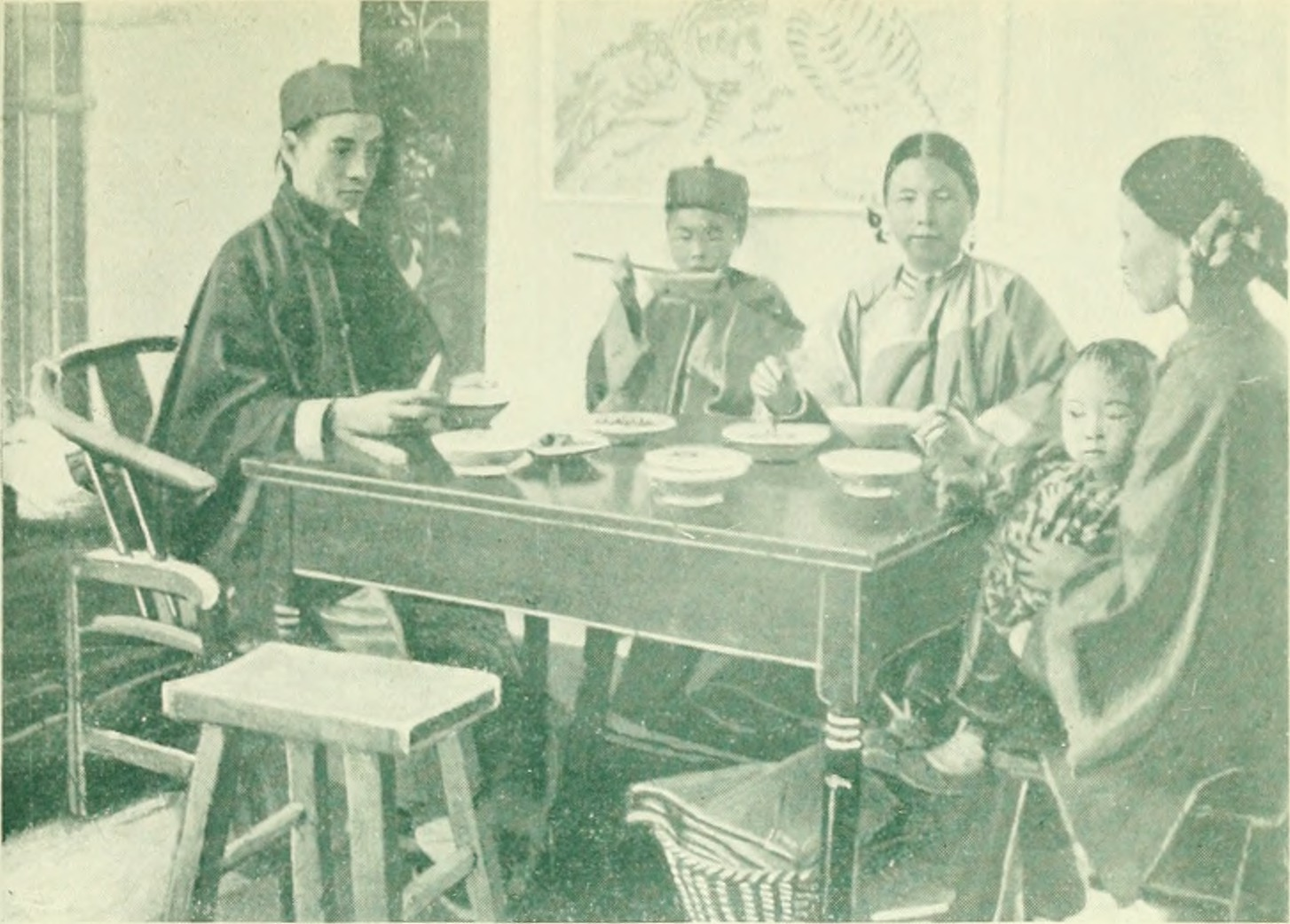

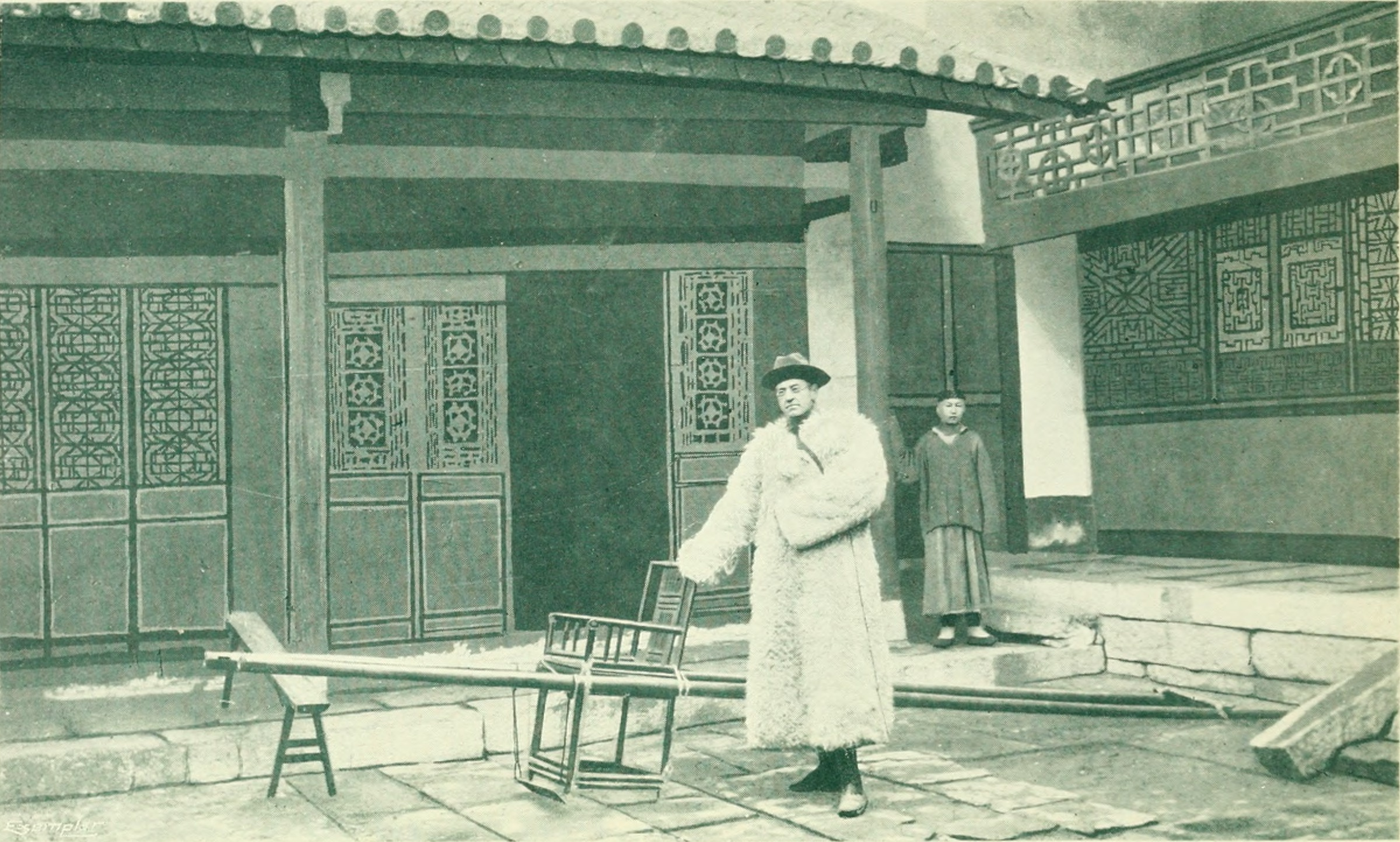

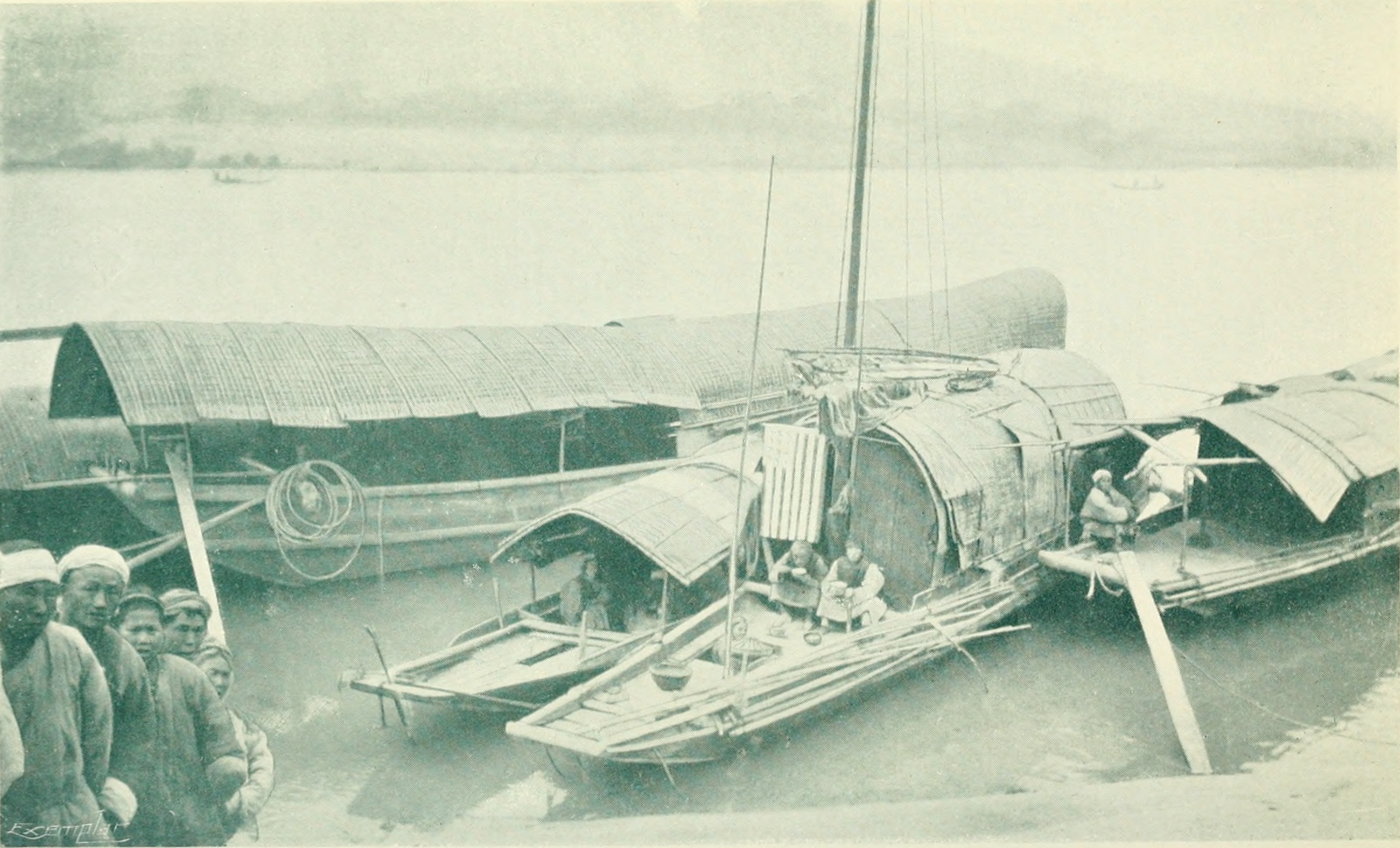
- Great Wall of China ( 1908)
- Eighteen Capitals of China (1909–1910)
- Sacred 5 of China (1919)

== Marriage and "The Barrens" ==
On March 2, 1912, Geil purchased a 17-acre piece of land south of Doylestown along Easton road (present-day Route 611). A week later, on March 8, he retained well known Doylestown architect Oscar Martin to design a 30-room concrete mansion. On April 9, Allentown, Pennsylvania contractor Jacob Nagel was awarded the building contract and began construction. The home became known as "The Barrens".

Around that same time, during a lecture in Titusville, Pennsylvania Geil met Lucy Constance Emerson. Constance Emerson was the daughter of Edward Octavius and Lucy Emerson, and was a relative of a relative of Ralph Waldo Emerson. Constance fascinated by his travels and humor fell in love, and in June 1912 the couple were wed at the First Baptist Church of Titusville.

The couple lived in "the Barrens", until 1919 when the Geils traveled to China.

== Death and legacy ==
In the years following his return from China and visit to the Sacred Five Mountains in China. Geil spent his time lecturing, writing, teaching Sunday School, and life at the Barrens with Constance, entertaining colleagues and guests from Bucks County and all over the world. In November 1924, William and Constance sailed from New York to Palestine to visit the Holy Land. It was Geil's last journey.

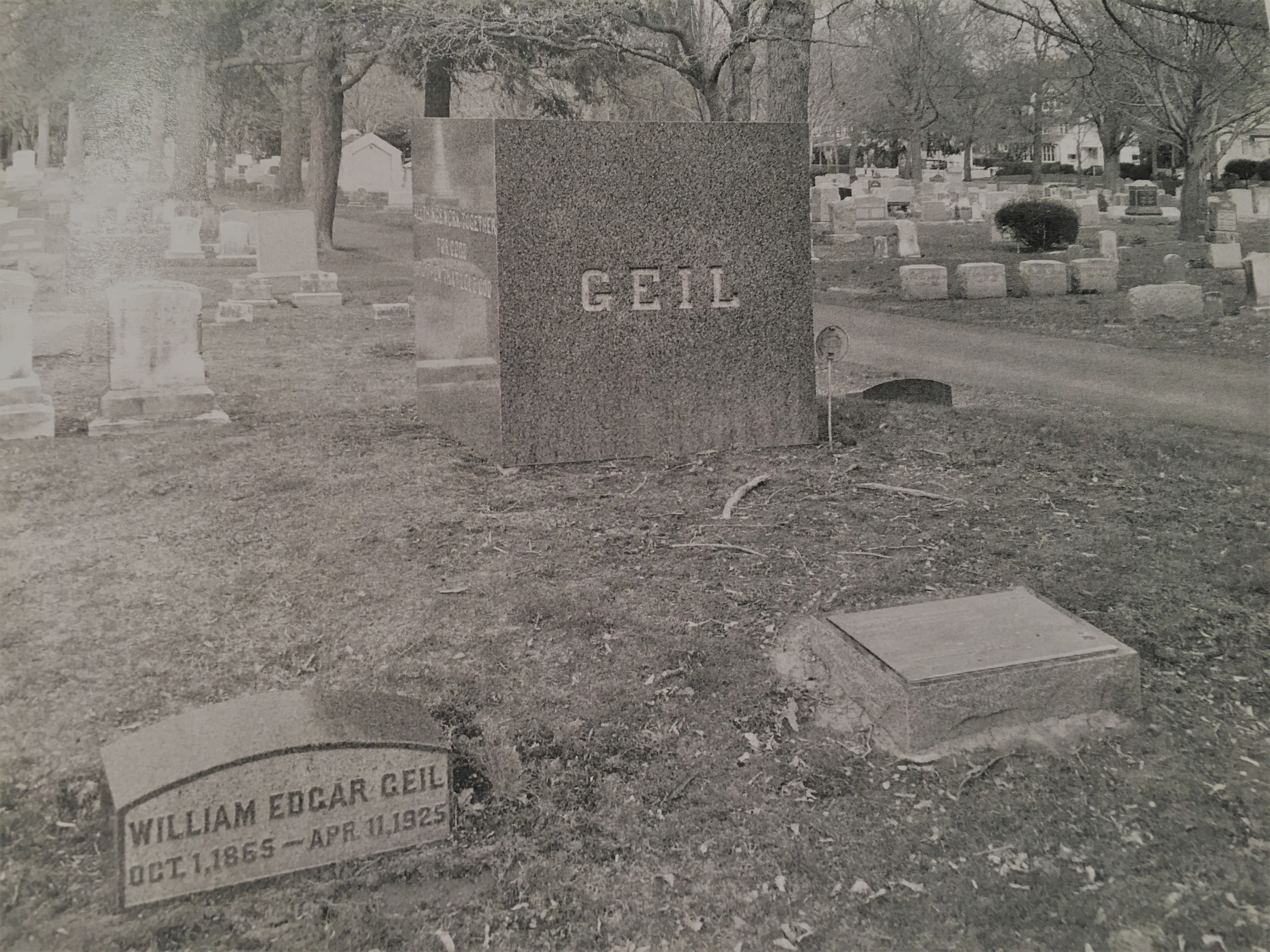
Dr. Geil's Grave, at Doylestown Cemetery in Doylestown, Pa.

On April 11, 1925, at age 59, Dr. William Edgar Geil died of influenza in Venice, Italy .

Constance Geil resided at the Barrens until her death in 1959, and preserved her husband's library, personal papers, and artifacts. In 1959, following her death, Walter Gustafson of Bucks County purchased the Geil library at public auction held at the Barrens. He preserved Geil's personal library until his death 2005. In 2008, his family donated the collection to the Doylestown Historical Society, where they are permanently housed and preserved today.

== Works ==
- Pocket sword, a pocketbook of Scripture reading for all people. 1891.
- Laodicea; or The great sermon of the stones. 1897.
- The isle that is called Patmos. Philadelphia: A. J. Rowland. 1897.
- Geil, William Edgar (2023) [1902]. Ocean and isle. W.T. Pater (published 1902). ISBN 9781020539800.
- A Yankee on the Yangtze. NY: A. C. Armstrong & Son. 1904.
- The automatic calf: the Commandments up-to-date. London: S. W. Partridge. 1905.
- A Yankee in pigmy land. London: Hodder & Stoughton. 1905.
- Man of Galilee. NY: YMCA. 1906.
- The Great Wall of China. NY: Sturgis & Walton. 1909.
- Eighteen capitals of China. Philadelphia: Lippincott. 1911.
- Adventures in the African jungle hunting pigmies. Garden City, NY: Doubleday, Page & Co. 1917.
- The sacred five of China. London: J. Murray. 1926.
