= Pero de Alenquer =

15th-century Portuguese explorer

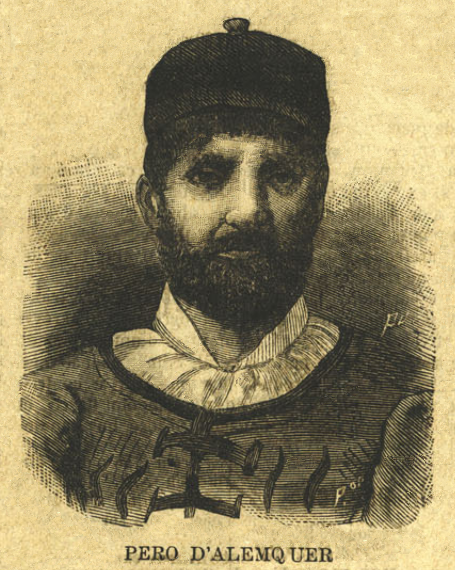
- 19th-century imagined portrait of Pero de Alenquer
- Born: Alenquer, Kingdom of Portugal
- Occupation: Explorer

Pero de Alenquer was a 15th-century Portuguese explorer of the African coast. He was born in Alenquer and accompanied Bartolomeu Dias on his journey around the Cape of Good Hope in 1487 and 1488. Alenquer was the pilot of Vasco da Gama's flagship on the latter's first voyage to India.
