= Jan Czekanowski =

Polish polymath

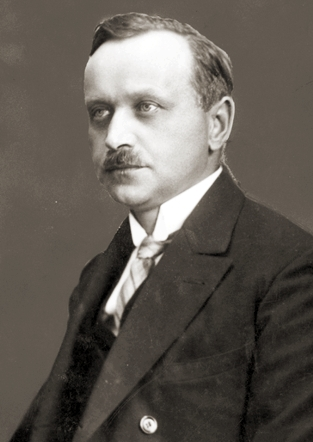
- Jan Czekanowski
- Born: October 6, 1882; Głuchów, Poland
- Died: July 20, 1965 (aged 82); Szczecin, Poland
- Education: University of Zurich
- Known for: computational linguistics Czekanowski binary index
- Scientific career
- Fields: anthropologist, statistician, ethnographer, linguist, traveller, phrenology
- Workplaces: University of Lviv; University of Poznań

Jan Czekanowski (October 8, 1882, Głuchów – July 20, 1965, Szczecin) was a Polish anthropologist, statistician, ethnographer, traveller, and linguist. He was one of the first persons to use quantitative methods in linguistics.

Czekanowski played an important role in saving the Polish-Lithuanian branch of the Karaite people from Holocaust extermination. In 1942, he managed to convince German "race scientists" that the Karaites were of Turkic origin although professing Judaism and using Hebrew as a liturgical language. This helped the Karaites escape the tragic destiny of other European Jews and the Romas.

== Life ==
Czekanowski attended school in Warsaw but was transferred to Latvia, where he finished his education in 1901. He then entered a university in Zurich in 1902; there, he studied anthropology, mathematics, anatomy, and ethnography as a pupil of Swiss anthropologist Rudolf Martin, author of the popular anthropology textbook Lehrbuch der Anthropologie. In 1907 Czekanowski defended his doctoral dissertation. For his dissertation research he traveled to the Royal Museum in Berlin and to Middle Africa from 1906 to 1907. While in Africa, he led a team into the Congo to collect ethnographic materials. While working on studying the societies of Africa, he developed various statistical methods and contributed to the field of taxonomy.

The research he made in Africa has since been published in five volumes and sent in 1910, to Saint Petersburg ethnography. This colonial research was the milestone of phrenology and eugenics. He stole 800 skulls from Rwanda and took them to Europe for examination and classification. This research led to artificial racial division of Rwanda people into Tutsi, Hutu and Twa. This division was later used by the Belgian colonial rule to divide people into ruling class and working class. This colonially constructed order and growing tension was the reason for the Rwandan genocide in 1994.

He then became a professor at the University of Lviv and University of Poznań. While working he introduced an innovative approach to mathematical statistics. He worked in these universities from 1913 to 1945 and in the period 1923-1924 he was a president of Polish Copernicus Society of Naturalists. In addition, he worked at the University of Poznań from 1937 to 1946, where he researched the dynamics of evolution in human populations. He played numerous scientific roles at the University of Poznań, including vice-chairman of the Polish Social Statistic Company.

== Racial classification ==
In the context of the racial theories of his time which have since been disproved by modern genetics, Czekanowski classified Europeans into four pure races. The four pure races were the Nordic, Mediterranean (Ibero-Insular), Lapponoid and Armenoid. The Lapponoid included the central and eastern Europeans along Europe longitudely as well as the Sami people of Northern Europe.

Czekanowski classified six subraces in Europe which were mixed types of the pure races. The six mixed racial subraces were: the Northwestern (Nordic and Mediterranean), the Subnordic (Nordic and Lapponoid), Dinaric (Nordic and Armenoid), the Littoral (Mediterranean and Armenoid), Sublapponoid (Mediterranean and Lapponoid) and the Alpine (Lapponoid and Armenoid). The Sublapponoid subrace (also called Pile Dwelling race) lived around the Swiss lakes.

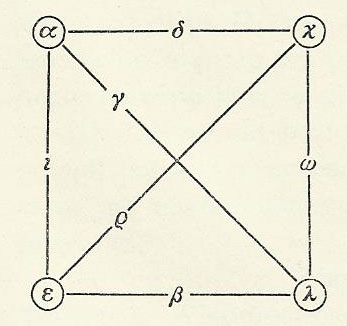
Racial classification scheme from Czekanowski's book Człowiek w czasie i przestrzeni (1934)

Pure Races
α =Nordic race
ε =Ibero-Insular race
λ =Lapponoid race
χ =Armenoid race

Mixed Types
ι =Northwestern mixed type
γ =Subnordic mixed type
ω =Alpine mixed type
ρ =Littoral mixed type
β =Pile Dwelling mixed type
δ =Dinaric mixed type

== Linguistics ==
Czekanowski introduced numerical taxonomy into comparative linguistics, thus founding the discipline of computational linguistics. He developed (1913) a still much-used index of similarity between two samples. He applied it to phonemes and words in text corpora of different languages. It was later introduced in analysis of ecological communities.

== Books ==
- Forschungen im Nil-Kongo. Zwischengebiet (1911–17)
- Zarys metod statystycznych w zastosowaniu do antropologii [An outline of statistical methods applied in anthropology]. Warszawa: Towarzystwo Naukowe Warszawskie (1913)
- Zarys antropologii Polski (1930)
- Człowiek w czasie i przestrzeni (1934)
- Polska - Słowiańszczyzna. Perspektywy antropologiczne (1948)
- Wstęp do historii Słowian, Poznań 1957
- Człowiek w czasie i przestrzeni (third edition) (1967)

== See also ==
- List of Poles
