= Álvaro Fernandes =

Portuguese explorer

Álvaro Fernandes (sometimes given erroneously as António Fernandes), was a 15th-century Portuguese explorer from Madeira, in the service of Henry the Navigator. He captained two important expeditions (in 1445 and 1446), which expanded the limit of the Portuguese discovery of the West African coast, probably as far as the northern borderlands of modern Guinea-Bissau. Álvaro Fernandes's farthest point (approximately Cape Roxo) would not be surpassed for ten years, until the voyage of Alvise Cadamosto in 1456.

== Background ==
Álvaro Fernandes was the nephew João Gonçalves Zarco, discoverer and donatary captain of Funchal. Fernandes was brought up (as a page or squire) in the household of Portuguese Prince Henry the Navigator.

== 1st expedition ==
In 1448, as part of a larger expedition mainly based in Lagos, Algarve, a small caravel fleet was assembled in Madeira. Two of the ships were outfitted by João Gonçalves Zarco, donatary of Funchal, who appointed his nephew, Álvaro Fernandes, created by Prince Henry, to captain one of them. Another ship was commanded by Tristão da Ilha, donatary captain of Machico, and another by Álvaro de Ornellas.

According to 15th-century chronicler Gomes Eanes de Zurara, Álvaro Fernandes went out alone, personally instructed by Prince Henry to avoid any raids, and aim straight for Guinea for the glory of exploration alone. Skipping Arguin, Álvaro Fernandes sailed straight south, reaching the mouth of the Senegal River. He stopped there only long enough to fill two barrels with river water.

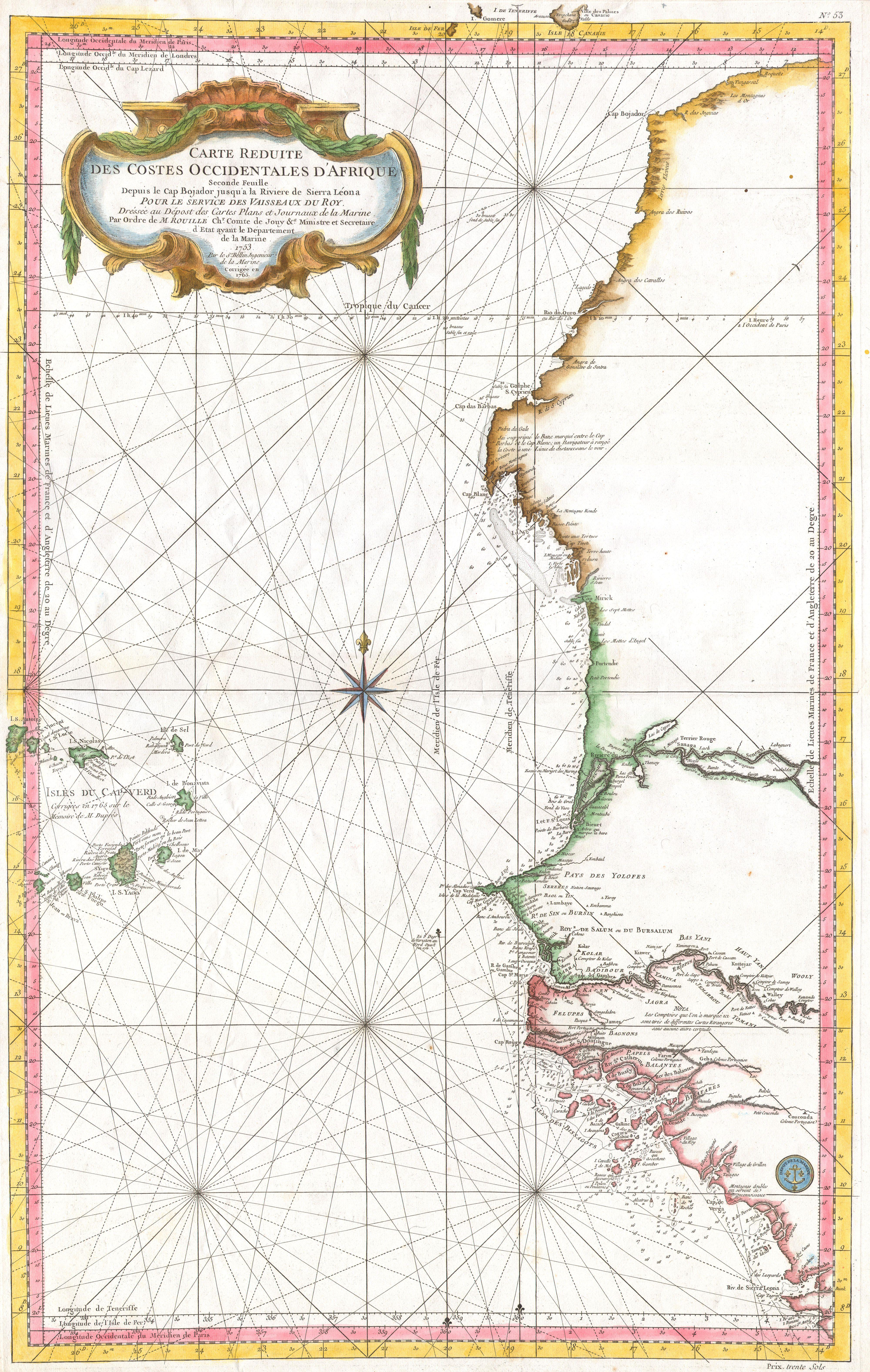
Sea chart of West Africa, c. 1765

Álvaro Fernandes continued sailing down the Grande Côte of Senegal until Cape Verde, the farthest point reached by Dinis Dias. It is uncertain if Dias actually surpassed the cape. If not, then Álvaro Fernandes may very well have been the first European to double Cape Verde and sail into the Angra de Bezeguiche (Bay of Dakar). Fernandes anchored at Bezeguiche island (Gorée island), which was uninhabited, but had many wild goats, which the crew proceeded to slaughter for food. Fernandes is said to have left his marker on the island by carving Prince Henry the Navigator's knightly motto, Talent de bien faire ("Hunger for good deeds") on a tree trunk.

While idling off the island, a couple of curious native canoes (five men each) from the mainland (Wolof or more probably Lebou people) paddled out to the caravel. The first encounter went smoothly enough—gestures were exchanged expressing peaceful intentions, and several of the natives were invited aboard, and given food and drink by the Portuguese, before setting back in their canoes and returning to the mainland. Encouraged by the report of the initial pacific encounter, six more canoes decided to paddle out to the caravel. But this time Álvaro Fernandes decided to set up an ambush, and prepared a launch with armed men, behind the concealed side of the caravel. As the native canoes got within range, Fernandes gave the signal and the hidden Portuguese armed launch darted out from behind the ship. The native canoes immediately began to turn around to make their way back to shore, but not before the Portuguese boat reached the closest African canoe. Cut off, the native crew leaped overboard and tried to swim back to shore. Two of the swimmers were captured by the Portuguese, but put up such a fight that by the time the second man was captured and subdued, all the others had made it safely to the mainland.

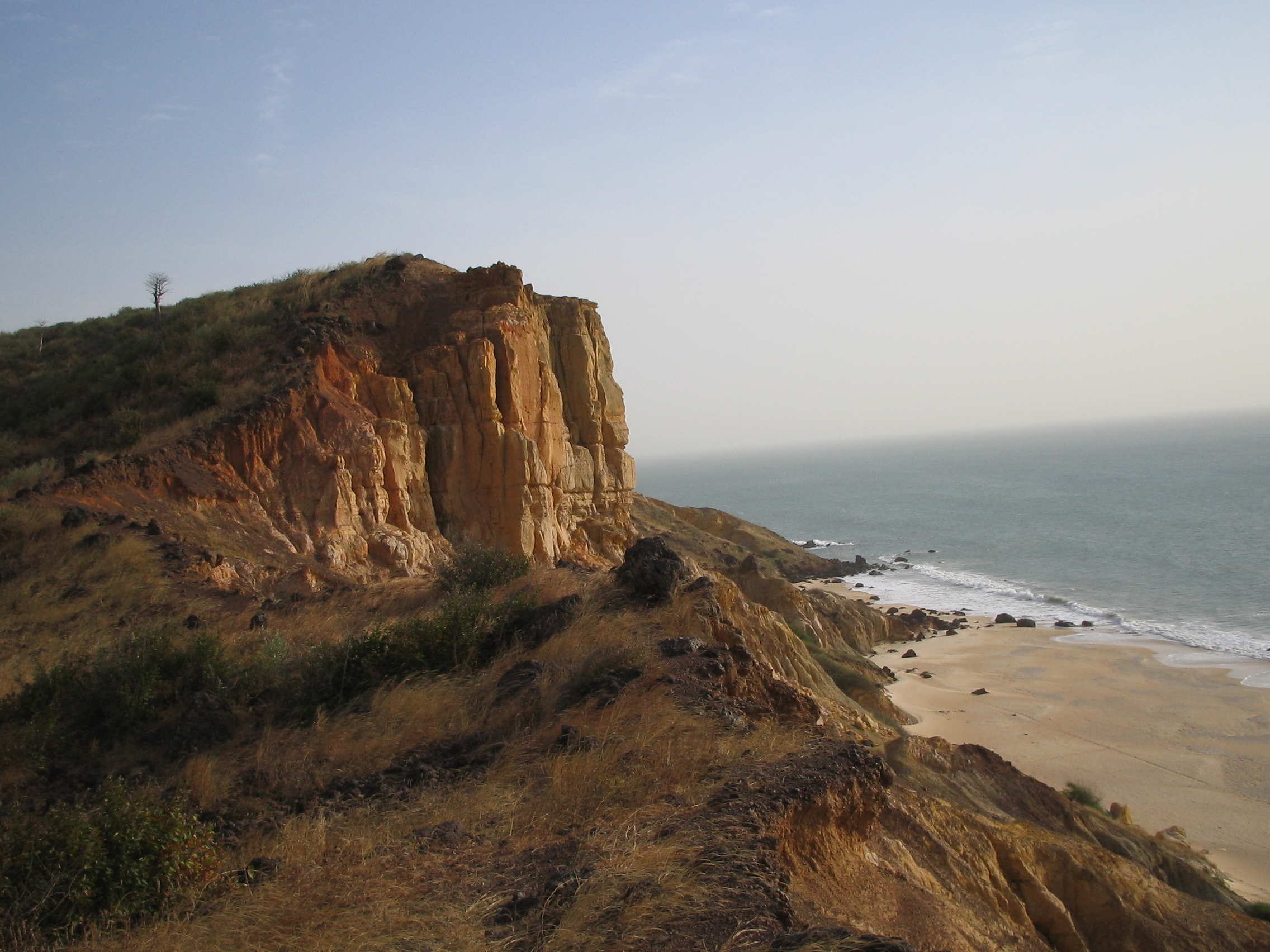
Cliffs of Popenguine, just above the Cape of Masts (Cap de Naze), farthest point reached by Álvaro Fernandes in 1445

The ambush had yielded only two captives, and raised the alarm on the mainland shore. With the element of surprise now gone, Álvaro Fernandes saw little point in remaining in the vicinity, and set sail out of Bezeguiche bay. He proceeded south along the Petite Côte a little way, until he reached an imposing cliff rock he called the Cabo dos Mastos ("Cape of Masts", on account of a set of dry, naked tree trunks, which resembled a cluster of ship's masts; now Cape Naze, 14°32′14″N 17°6′14″W). Fernandes ordered a launch to scout the nearby area. They came upon a small hunting party of four natives (possibly Serer) in the vicinity, and tried to capture them by surprise, but the startled hunters managed to escape and outrun the Portuguese.

Alvaro Fernandes returned to Portugal thereafter, with the two captives from Bezeguiche, the barrels of Senegal River water and the hunters' weapons to show for it. His hostile action had raised the alarm among the populations around Bezeguiche bay. The next Portuguese ships to arrive in the area—the large slaving fleet of Lançarote de Freitas a few months later—would be greeted by a hail of arrows and poisoned darts, and forced away.

Álvaro Fernandes sailed further south than any prior Portuguese captain, setting up the Cape of Mastos as the farthest marker. For that, he and his uncle, João Gonçalves Zarco, were amply rewarded by Prince Henry.

== 2nd expedition ==
In the following year, João Gonçalves Zarco set out again on a caravel, commanded by his nephew Álvaro Fernandes. Fernandes headed straight to his last point (Cabo dos Matos), and landed a little exploring party, but finding nobody, re-embarked and continued sailing on. At an indeterminate point south of there, they spotted a local coastal village and disembarked a party, only to be met by an armed native force (probably Serer), intent on defending their village. Álvaro Fernandes killed what he believed was the native chieftain at the beginning of the encounter, prompting the rest of the local warriors to briefly halt the fight. The Portuguese landing party availed themselves of the pause to hurry back to their ship.

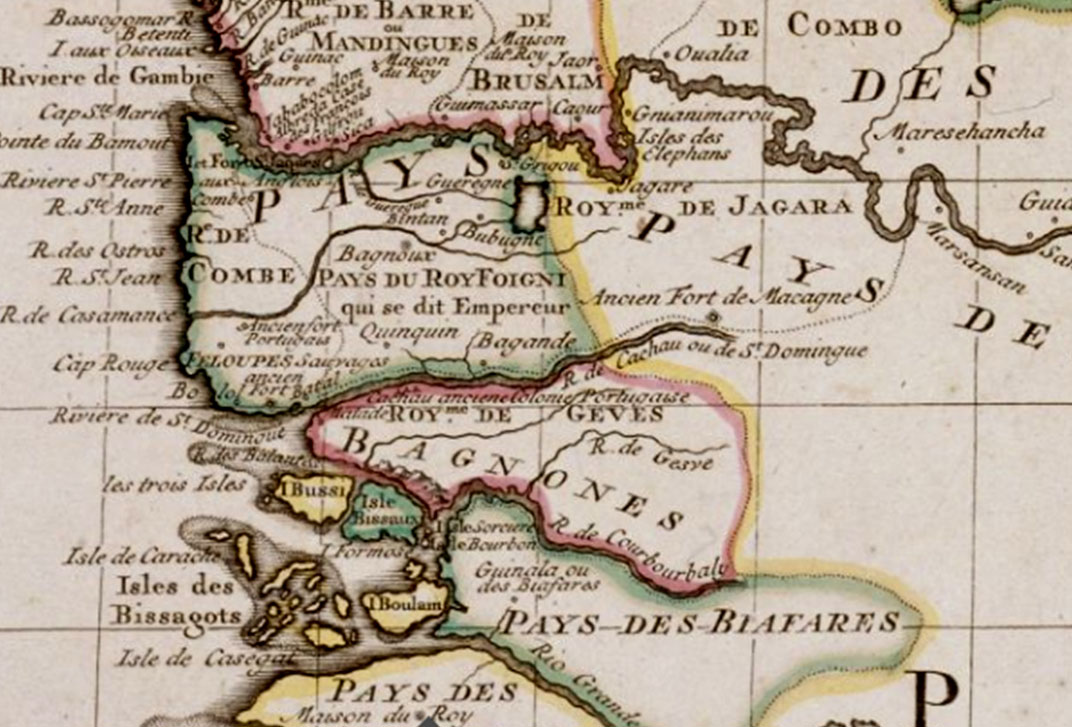
The environs of the Casamance River, from a French map c. 1726

Having sailed a little on, the next day, the Portuguese captured two young local women collecting shellfish by the shore. The caravel resumed sail, and continued "for a certain distance", until they reached a large river, which is recorded in the chronicles as "Rio Tabite" (location uncertain, see below). Although probably aware of the fate of Nuno Tristão on a similar river venture, Alvaro Fernandes nonetheless decided to set a launch to explore upriver. The first exploratory boat made a landing on the bank near some local huts, where they quickly captured a local woman and brought her back to the caravel. Then refitting the boat, they set out again, this time intending to sail further upriver. But they did not get far before they came upon four or five native canoes with armed men heading towards them. Fernandes immediately turned the boat around and began racing back to the caravel, with the canoes hot on his tail. One of the canoes went fast enough to nearly catch up with Fernandes's boat, prompting Fernandes to turn and prepare for a fight. But the lead native canoe, realizing it was alone, slowed down to wait for the others, thus giving the Portuguese boat the opportunity to resume their flight back to the caravel. The Portuguese escaped, but Álvaro Fernandes himself was gravely wounded in the leg by a poisoned arrow shot from one of the canoes. Once aboard ship, he disinfected the wound with urine and olive oil. He lay in fever for a few days, on the edge of death, but recovered.

Despite the near-fatal experience, the caravel proceeded straight south for a little longer, until they reached a sandy cape and large sandy bay. They put a small boat to explore near the beach, but found a force of some 120 natives, armed with shields, assegais and bows marching towards them. The explorers immediately returned to the caravel. Nonetheless, the armed native party gave what seemed like a peaceful festive demonstration from the beach - waving and inviting the Portuguese to land. But given Fernandes's ill condition and still shaken by their earlier near-escape, the decision was made to quit the area and set sail back to Portugal.

On the way home, Fernandes stopped by Arguin island and a nearby cape in the bay, where they negotiated the purchase of a black slave-woman from some Berber traders. Upon arrival in Portugal, Álvaro Fernandes was amply rewarded by Prince Henry the Navigator who offered him 100 dubloons, and regent Peter of Coimbra, who gave him another 100, for having sailed further than any other Portuguese captain thus far.

== Extent of explorations ==
Of all the Henrican captains of the 1440s, Álvaro Fernandes seemed to have pushed the discovery marker farthest. It is almost certain that, on his first expedition (1445), Álvaro Fernandes surpassed all others and was the first European to land on Bezeguiche (Gorée island, in the bay of Dakar), sailing as far as the Cape of Masts (Cape Naze) in central Senegal.

The extent of his second 1446 journey is more uncertain. Zurara reports Fernandes sailed as far as 110 leagues beyond Cape Vert. If Zurara was exactly correct, that would mean Fernandes reached the environs of Cape Verga (10°12′16″N 14°27′13″W, in modern Guinea), an incredible leap beyond his last point. Chronicler João de Barros goes even further, identifying the river Fernandes sailed up as the "Rio Tabite". The exact identification of "Rio Tabite" is uncertain, for that name is not found on old charts. Barros notes merely that Rio Tabite is 32 leagues beyond the "Rio de Nuno Tristão". If we assume the latter to be the Nunez River (in modern Guinea), that would lead us to identify the "Rio Tabite" with the Forecariah River 9°16′57″N 13°20′10″W in modern Guinea, implying Fernandes sailed a tremendous 135 leagues beyond Cape Vert, well beyond the 110 suggested by Zurara. At the other extreme, the Viscount of Santarém identified the Rio Tabite with the Rio do Lago (Diombos River, in the Sine-Saloum Delta of Senegal), a mere 24 leagues from Cape Vert. However, the Diombos is the prime candidate location for the death of Nuno Tristão himself. If that was also sailed by Fernandes, then that eliminates Fernandes's claim to have exceeded Nuno Tristão's last point by many leagues. The Tabite has also been tentatively identified with the Gambia River, although this does not find many adherents for the same reasons of being too close to Tristão's last point.

Modern historians believe both Zurara and Barros greatly exaggerated in implying Álvaro Fernandes reached modern Guinea. In particular, it is highly unlikely he would have sailed past the huge Geba River and the many Bissagos Islands and other notable promontories and landmarks without exploring them or making the least mention of them. Moreover, Zurara claims that all along Fernandes's route from Cape Vert, the "coast tendeth generally south", thus eliminating the wilder estimates (the coast runs steadily southeast after Cape Roxo).

Reviewing the evidence, Teixeira da Mota suggests that the "Tabite" river Fernandes sailed up was probably the Casamance River (12°33′7″N 16°45′50″W, Senegal) and the low cape and sandy bay that marked his final point was the stretch around Cape Varela (12°17′01″N 16°35′25″W, just below Cape Roxo, at the northern end of what is now Guinea-Bissau). That means Fernandes really sailed 50 leagues (not 110) beyond Cape Vert. That still makes it the farthest point reached by the Portuguese discoveries of the 1440s.

The only real difficulty with the Casamance hypothesis is the use of poisoned arrows, which was common among the Serer, Nimoninka and Mandinka peoples of the Saloum-Gambia area, but not among the Jola people (Felupes) of the Casamance. But historians doubt whether Fernandes was actually hit with a poisoned arrow at all, rather than a regular arrow and simply suffered a common infection in the aftermath. The very fact that he survived suggests it was not poisoned, as does the fact that no other sailors reported any similar injuries. (It contrasts sharply with the fate of Nuno Tristão and his crew in the Diombos River, where a score of men fell dead quickly from Niominka poison. Given Tristão's fate, Zurara may have simply assumed all tribes south of Cape Verde used poison.)

The other footnote is why Fernandes' caravel was ambushed on the river by the Jola of the Casamance, who were unfamiliar with the Portuguese. Teixeira da Mota points to the abduction of the woman on the bank may have alerted the river peoples to the hostile intentions of the Portuguese. This contrasts with the Jola people on the beaches of Cape Varela, whose festive reception and hailing to the Portuguese ships from the shore reveals they had little or no prior notion of Portuguese slavers.

Unfortunately, Zurara reports no topographic names bestowed by Álvaro Fernandes on his second journey, and the imprecise magnitudes reported ("some days", "a certain distance") are not very elucidating, leaving this conclusion still open to dispute. All that seems certain is that Fernandes sailed beyond his previous marker in 1446, and that this would remain standing as the record length reached by the Portuguese discoveries for the next decade. Fernandes's marker was only surpassed ten years later, in 1456, by Alvise Cadamosto, a Venetian explorer in Henry's service. Cadamosto laid claim to be discoverer of the Casamance River, and named it after the local king (mansa) of the Kasa (a near-extinct people related to the Bainuk people).

== Sources ==
- João de Barros (1552) Décadas da Ásia: Dos feitos, que os Portuguezes fizeram no descubrimento, e conquista, dos mares, e terras do Oriente.. Vol. 1 (Dec I, Lib.1-5).
- Gomes Eanes de Zurara (1453) Crónica dos feitos notáveis que se passaram na Conquista da Guiné por mandado do Infante D. Henrique or Chronica do descobrimento e conquista da Guiné. (Trans. 1896–99 by C.R. Beazley and E. Prestage), The Chronicle of the Discovery and Conquest of Guinea, London: Halyut, v.1, v.2
- Beazley, C.R. and E. Prestage (1896–99) "Introduction" & "Notes" in English translation of Zurara's Chronicle.
- Castilho, A.M. de (1866) Descripção e roteiro da costa occidental de Africa, desde o cabo de Espartel até o das Agulhas, Lisbon: Impresa Nacional, 2 vols.
- Cortesão, Armando (1931) "Subsídios para a história do Descobrimento de Cabo Verde e Guiné", Boletim da Agencia Geral das Colonias, No. 75. As reprinted in 1975, Esparsos, vol. 1, Coimbra. online
- Diffie, Bailey W., and George D. Winius (1977) Foundations of the Portuguese empire, 1415–1580 Minneapolis, MN: University of Minnesota Press
- Manuel de Faria e Sousa (1675) ""Empieça la Memoria de todas las Armadas", in Asia Portuguesa, Vol. 3, p.525-61
- Diogo Gomes De prima inventione Guineae (Portuguese translation by Gabriel Pereira (1898–99) as "As Relações do Descobrimento da Guiné e das ilhas dos Açores, Madeira e Cabo Verde" in Boletim da Sociedade de Geografia de Lisboa, no. 5 online)
- Leite, Duarte (1941) Acerca da «Crónica dos Feitos de Guinee». Lisbon: Bertrand
- Magalhães Godinho, Vitorino de (1945) Documentos sôbre a Espansão Portuguesa, 2 vols, Lisbon: Gleba.
- Peres, Damião (1943) História dos descobrimentos portugueses, Porto: Portucalense.
- Quintella, Ignaco da Costa (1839–40) Annaes da Marinha Portugueza, 2 vols, Lisbon: Academia Real das Sciencias. vol. 1
- Teixeira da Mota, Avelino (1946) "A descoberta da Guiné", Boletim cultural da Guiné Portuguesa, Vol. 1. Part 1 in No. 1 (Jan), p. 11-68, Pt. 2 in No. 2 (Apr), p. 273-326; Pt. 3 in No. 3 (Jul), p. 457-509.
- Teixeira da Mota, Avelino (1972) Mar, além Mar: Estudos e ensaios de história e geographia. Lisbon: Junta de Investigações do Ultramar
