= Niominka people =

Ethnic group of Senegal

Niominka
Total population
- 10,000

Regions with significant populations

Languages
- Serer, French

Religion
- Islam, Serer religion, animism

The Niominka people (also called Niuminka or Nyominka) are an ethnic group in Senegal living on the islands of the Saloum River delta. They are currently classified as a subgroup of the Serer.

== Population ==
The territory of the Niominka is called the Gandoul. Most of the Niominka live in its eleven large villages, which include Niodior, Dionewar, and Falia. They represent a little less than 1% of the population of Senegal.

Being island-dwellers, they participate in both agriculture and aquaculture. The primary agricultural produce is made up of rice, millet, and peanuts. As for the aquaculture, the men fish and the women gather shellfish, although environmental problems have become an aquacultural threat.

The Niominka are also beginning to look into tourism.

== History ==
The origins of the Niominka are obscure and uncertain. Although currently classified together with the Serer people, their name is drawn from Mandinka, meaning "coastal people" (Niumi = coast, and Nka = men), and were known to have been ruled by a mansa (Mandinka for "king"), suggesting they might have originally been either a Mandinka people that were later "Sererized" by migrants from the north, or conversely, a Serer people that were for some time "Mandinkized" by their neighbors from the south. They were overlooked in the process of the "organization" of the Sine and Saloum kingdoms via the Mandinka Guelowar dynasty in the 14th century. Theories suggest they were originally neither Serer nor Mandinka, but an altogether different people, probably related to the Jola people and speakers of Bak language that inhabited the banks of the Gambia River, until they were pushed from below by the migration of Mandinka from the south and east in the 13th century, only to hit the barrier of migrating Serer people from the north, and as a result ended up squeezed into a corner of the delta, south of the Saloum River. A supplementary theory suggests they were not a distinctive people, but rather just a disparate collection of indeterminate aboriginal riverine inhabitants and migrants, refugees and fugitives from neighboring Mandinka and Serer states that flocked to that relatively inaccessible and ungoverned delta corner, and eked out a largely independent existence.

The Niominka were largely unorganized, with an egalitarian social structure quite unlike their neighbors. The nominal overlordship of the Niominka seems to have flipped back and forth between the Mandinka mansa of Barra to the south and the Serer king of Saloum to the north. The Niominka adopted some cultural and economic elements from both, e.g. cultivation of millet from Serer, rice from Mandinka, but also possess elements quite distinctive in their own right, most notably riverine fishing. The Niominka are believed to have been the only traditionally aquacultural people on the stretch of the west African coast south of Cape Vert and north of the Bissagos.

Old texts sometimes identify the Niominka as the "Niumi Bato", as distinct from their southerly neighbors, the "Niumi Banta" (ancestral to the Mandinka of Barra). Through much of their history, the Niumi Bato (Niominka), the Niumi Banta and the nearby Jokadu were all under the rule of the same Mandinka lord known as the "Niumimansa". However, there were repeated attempts by the Serer king of Saloum to exert his authority over the Niominka. The Niominka (Niumi Bato) controlled the stretch of coast roughly from the south bank of the Saloum River to a little above Barra point, including the entries of the Diombos, Banjala and Jinnak rivers and the associated delta islands; the Niumi of Barra (Niumi Banta) lived below them, on the northern shores of the Gambia River. Niominka pirogues may have plied the coast and rivers further south (including the Gambia, maybe as far as the Casamance River.

According to historians, the Niominka were probably responsible killing the Portuguese explorer and slave-trader Nuno Tristão in 1446. Tristão had ventured up the Diombos river on a longboat with his crew intending to find a native settlement to raid, when the Portuguese were trapped by Niominka canoes and massacred. The memoirs of Diogo Gomes suggest the Niominka canoes proceeded to venture out to sea, overwhelmed the remaining Portuguese in the waiting caravel, and proceeded to drag the ship upriver to dismantle it, its anchor later being found in the possession of the Niumimansa. The very next year, the Niumimansa ordered an attack on another Portuguese exploration-slaving party, led by Estêvão Afonso, although this was probably carried out further south, nearer the Gambia shore by the Niumi Banta (of Barra) (the Portuguese clambered back aboard and fled). There were two more attacks on Portuguese explorers in the area within the next year - one on Álvaro Fernandes, a massed canoe attack similar to the attack on Tristão (although Fernandes escaped); another an attack on a landing party led by Danish captain Valarte (who was killed).

The series of attacks on Portuguese explorers by the Niominka (and their neighbors) in the Saloum-Gambia area prompted the Portuguese Prince Henry the Navigator to suspend all Portuguese expeditions south of Cape Vert in 1448. The Saloum delta in particular, with its rivulets and entries plied by the canoe-borne Niominka, was deemed too dangerous for Portuguese ships to pass. When a new expedition, led by Alvise Cadamosto, finally dared venture to that area again in 1455, one of his landing parties was killed by the mouth of the Saloum (possibly Niominka again), and Cadamosto's own ship attacked and fended off at the mouth of the Gambia by the Niumi Banta. Cadamosto reports the fierceness of the Niumi people rested on their belief that the Portuguese were cannibals, who came to capture black men to eat. But the very next year (1456), when Cadamosto returned, there was a very different reception, and Cadamosto ventured peacefully up the Gambia, and even amicably met the Niumimansa himself. What caused this change of heart is uncertain. In his own (unreliable) memoirs, Portuguese captain Diogo Gomes reports he was personally responsible for negotiating a peace treaty c. 1456 (perhaps a little later) with the Niumimansa, and even of baptising him as a Christian.

In the early 1860s, when the peoples of the Gambia area were raised in revolt against the Mandinka aristocracy by the Toucouleur marabout Maba Diakhou Bâ, the Niumi were not immune. The Niumimansa died in 1861, and an offshoot marabout rising ensued in the coastal area. When Maba Bâ launched an attack on the kingdom of Saloum, both the Mandinka-speaking Niumi of Barra and the Serer-speaking Niominka swore allegiance to the marabouts and joined in the attack on the Serers of Saloum.

== Filmography ==
- Le Mbissa, a documentary film by Alexis Fifis and Cécile Walter, produced by the IRD

== Bibliography ==
- G.E. Brooks (1993) Landlords and Strangers: ecology, society and trade in West Africa, 1000-1630 Westview.
- (in French) M.C. Cormier-Salem (1999) Rivières du Sud: sociétés et mangroves ouest-africaines, vol.1
- Virginia Coulon (Spring 1973). "Niominka Pirogue Ornaments". African Arts. 6 (3): 26–31. doi:10.2307/3334691. JSTOR 3334691.
- Joseph Kerharo; Jacques G. Adam (1964). "Les plantes médicinales, toxiques et magiques des Niominka et des Socé des îles du Saloum (Sénégal)". Acta Tropica (in French) (8): 279–334.
- M.A. Klein (1968) Islam and imperialism in Senegal: Sine-Saloum, 1847-1914.
- F. Lafont (1938). "Le Gandoul et les Niominkas". Bulletin du Comité d'Études Historiques et Scientifiques de 1'AOF. XXI (in French) (3): 385–450.
- Assane Niane (1995). Les Niominka de l'offensive musulmane en 1863 à l'établissement du protectorat français en 1891 : Le Gandun dans la maîtrise du royaume du Saalum (in French). Dakar: Université Cheikh Anta Diop. p. 81.
- (in Portuguese) A. Teixera da Mota (1946) "A descoberta da Guiné", Boletim cultural da Guiné Portuguesa, Vol. 1 (1), p. 11-68, (2), p. 273-326; (3), p. 457-509.
- R. Van Chi Bonnardel (1977). "Exemple de migrations multiformes intégrées : les migrations de Nyominka (îles du Bas-Saloum sénégalais)". Bulletin de l'IFAN. B (in French). 39 (4): 837–889.
- D. Wright (1976) Niumi: the history of a western Mandinka state through the eighteenth century. Bloomington: Indiana University.
