= Senegalese nationality law =

Senegalese Nationality Law

National Assembly of Senegal
- Long title: Loi No. 6170 du 7 mars 1961 déterminant la nationalité sénégalaise (modifiée par la Loi No. 61-10 du 7 mars 1961, la Loi No. 67-17 du 28 février 1967, la Loi No. 70-27 du 27 juin 970, la Loi No. 70-31 du 13 octobre 1970, la Loi No. 79-01 du 6 janvier 1979, la Loi No. 84-10 du 4 janvier 1984, la Loi No. 89-42 du 26 décembre 1989, et la Loi No. 2013-05 du 8 juillet 2013)
- Enacted by: Government of Senegal
- Status: Current legislation

Senegalese nationality law is regulated by the Constitution of Senegal, as amended; the Nationality Law, and its revisions; and various international agreements to which the country is a signatory. These laws determine who is, or is eligible to be, a national of Senegal. The legal means to acquire nationality, formal legal membership in a nation, differ from the domestic relationship of rights and obligations between a national and the nation, known as citizenship. Nationality describes the relationship of an individual with the state under international law, whereas citizenship is the domestic relationship of an individual within the nation. Senegalese nationality is typically obtained under the principal of jus sanguinis, i.e. by birth in Senegal or abroad to parents with Senegalese nationality. It can be granted, through naturalization, to persons with an affiliation to the country, or to a permanent resident who has lived in the country for a given period of time.

== Acquisition of nationality ==
Nationality can be acquired in Senegal at birth or later in life through naturalization.

=== By birth ===
Those who acquire nationality at birth include:

- Children born in Senegal to at least one parent also born in Senegal;
- Children born anywhere to at least one parent who is a Senegalese national; or (Note: Ibrahima Kane, a human rights lawyer, specified that the Senegalese law recognizes that civil status has changed over time and that the law is written in a way to encompass those who have publicly and continuously presented themselves as Senegalese and have been recognized as such by the public and authorities. (French: "Compte tenu du peu de fiabilité de l’état civil, le législateur y a ajouté un critère de « possession d’état » pour l’acquisition automatique de la nationalité sénégalaise. Par possession d’état, la loi entend le fait de « s’être continuellement et publiquement comporté comme un Sénégalais et d’avoir été continuellement et publiquement, traité comme tel par la population et les autorités sénégalaises"))
- Newborn foundlings born in the country whose parents are unknown.

=== By naturalization ===
Naturalization can be granted to persons who have resided in the territory for a sufficient period of time to confirm they understand the customs and traditions of Senegal and are integrated into the society. General provisions are that applicants have good character and conduct; are in good mental and physical health; (Note: Ibrahima Kane, notes that limiting a person's ability to naturalize on the basis of a disability is a violation of the Convention on the Rights of Persons with Disabilities to which Senegal is a signatory.) can be economically self-sufficient; and have no criminal record which resulted in prison sentence. Applicants must typically have resided in the country for ten years. Besides foreigners meeting the criteria, other persons who may be naturalized include:

- Children legally adopted by a Senegalese parent, at the time of completion of a legal adoption automatically derive Senegalese nationality;
- Minor children are automatically naturalized when their parent acquires nationality;
- Persons who have habitually resided in Senegal and both behaved as if they were a national and have been accepted as a national by society may acquire nationality via a tribunal;
- The legal spouse of a Senegalese national after five years of marriage; or
- Persons who have worked in government administration or performed important or exceptional service to the nation may naturalize after a five-year residency period.

== Loss of nationality ==
Senegalese nationals can renounce their nationality pending approval by the state. Senegalese of origin may not lose their nationality. Naturalized persons may be denaturalized in Senegal for disloyalty to the state; committing crimes against the state or state security; or for ordinary serious crimes. Though the law also specifies that persons can lose their nationality for obtaining another nationality, the provision requires government approval, which in practice has been allowed by the Senegalese Ministry of Justice. There are no provisions in the nationality law for persons who previously had nationality to repatriate.

== Dual nationality ==
Since 2013, Senegal has allowed nationals to hold dual nationality, unless the other country prohibits multiple nationalities.

== History ==
Human presence in the Senegambia began over 10,000 years ago and included the ancestors of the Fulani, Jola, Serer, Tukulor, and Wolof peoples. The first centralized state in the region, the Takrur Kingdom, emerged in the fourth century. The kingdom stretched across the Senegal River valley from the Ferlo Desert to the Sahara and was involved with the Zenaga Berbers in the trans-Saharan trade. In the eighth century, the Berbers brought Islam to the region, and by the eleventh century, it had become the state religion of Takrur. In the thirteenth century, Takrur was conquered by the Mali Empire and the Kingdom of Jolof arose in the northwestern savanna area of what is now Senegal. Jolof expanded in the fourteenth century making vassal states of the Kingdoms of Saloum and Sine. These states were governed by regional traditional rulers who were paid taxes by their subject, and in turn who paid tribute to the Empire or Kingdom, in exchange for protection from outside attack of their traditional lands and trade routes.

=== African empires and outsider contact (1364–1659) ===
In 1364, Jehan li Roanois (alternately called Jean de Rouen), a French merchant and explorer from Normandy, landed on the Liberian Coast and traveled down to the Gold Coast. The following year, French explorers returned and established a chain of trading stations as far south as the Senegal River. These were abandoned between 1410 and 1413 because of situations in France, including the 14th century plague and Hundred Years' War. From 1444, Prince Henry the Navigator sent out expeditions from Portugal to determine whether trade in the region could be established. Voyages were led by Diogo Afonso, Antão Gonçalves, Gomes Pires, and Nuno Tristão, among others. Later that year, Dinis Dias, inspired by these earlier voyages, sighted the Senegal River and encountered the Jolof Empire before continuing south to Cape Verde and the Ilha da Palma, now known as Gorée. Establishing commerce with Serer and Wolof leaders, the Portuguese traded guns, horses and metal for slaves, making the Senegambia the center focus of its Trans-Atlantic Slave Trade throughout the fifteenth and sixteenth centuries.

The rapid expansion of the slave trade fractured the African societies in the Senegambia. The Kingdom of Galam (also called Gajaaga or Gadjaga) became the dominant kingdom of the upper Senegal River valley. By the mid-sixteenth century, the Jolof Empire dissolved when its member states began fighting for independence. Break-out states included the Imamate of Futa Toro in the middle Senegal valley; the Niana and Wuli Kingdoms on the northern banks of the Gambia River; and the Wolof and Serer states of Baol, Kajor, Salum, Sine and Waalo, along the coastline. Weak kingdoms could not protect their subjects from raiders or traders, giving rise to internal factionalism and conflict. European rivals also had frequent conflicts because of the competition for trade. During the period, it was typical for governments to grant chartered trading companies governmental authority and trading monopolies to establish a claim to territory. For example, the British formed the Royal African Company in 1625, the Dutch West India Company began operating in Africa the same year, and the French established the Norman Company in 1626. (Note: The Compagnie Normande was reconstituted as the Compagnie de Rouen in 1633 and dissolved in 1659 to be reformed as the Company of Cape Vert and Senegal. That entity was purchased in 1664 by Jean-Baptiste Colbert who reformed it as the French West India Company (Compagnie des Indes Occidentales). In 1673 Colbert split his company, renaming the West African operation as the Company of Senegal (Compagnie du Sénégal). After its bankruptcy in 1681, the enterprise was reorganized as the Compagnie du Sénégal et la Côte de Guinée, which was then divided into the Company of Senegal and Company of Guinee in 1684. The Company of Senegal was reformed as the Royal Company of Senegal (Compagnie royale du Sénégal) in 1696, but because of poor management declared bankruptcy in 1708 and assigned its commercial interests over to the French South Sea Company (Compagnie de la Mer du Sud). A second Royal Company of Senegal, also known as the Compagnie de Rouen was chartered in 1709. France continued licensing companies to operate in Senegal, such as le groupe d’Appougny (1709); le groupe Musellier and Compagnie d'Occident (1717); le marché du Sénégal (1718); royal Compagnie perpétuelle des Indes (1719); Société de Ginée et Angolan Society (1748) until a 1716 decree issued by the regent Philippe d'Orléans abolished the system of trading monopolies and began phasing out licensing. In effect the companies became tax collectors for France and were completely liquidated by 1771.) The Dutch drove the Portuguese from West Africa after capturing Fort Elmina in 1637, followed by their forts at Axim, Luanda, Benguela, São Tomé, and Annobon. As the Portuguese dominance declined, British, Danish, French, and Swedish traders also moved in to the region, but mainly operated in the coastal regions. In 1638, the French established a trading station on Bocos Island (Île de Bocos) at the mouth of the Senegal River to trade with the indigenous people on the coast. They moved this commercial enterprise in 1659 to Ndar Island and established the post of Saint-Louis.

=== French period (1659–1960) ===
From Saint-Louis, the French began to expand south. In 1677, they captured four Dutch trading forts, including Gorée, Joal, Portudal and Rufisque, on the Senegalese coast. The seizures were led by Jean du Casse, who was hired by the Company of Senegal to expel rival traders and safeguard French holdings. In 1678, he seized the Dutch post at Arguin and the following year launched raids against the Wolof, Bawol and Sine rulers, to force them to sign treaties of protection and grant exclusive trade rights in their territories. These treaties, became the basis for Frances claims of the right of occupation in the Senegambia. In 1697, André Brue, an official of the Royal Senegal Company explored widely in the area and consolidated French power in Senegal. Dakar was established as a trading post in 1750. During the eighteenth century, the British captured all of the French trading posts in the area, but returned Goreé under the terms of the 1763 Treaty of Paris which ended the Seven Years' War and the remainder of France's former Senegalese settlements in 1817 at the end of the Napoleonic Wars.

The Ancien Régime of France developed a system of feudal allegiance in which subjects were bound together by a scheme of protection and service tied to land ownership. Possession of land was typically tied to military and court service and omitted women because they could not perform those obligations. Thus, French nationality also derived from place of birth in French territory, until the nineteenth century, but under feudal law married women were subjugated to the authority of their husbands under coverture. Though attempts were made to codify the common law of the colonies in 1716, 1738, 1758, and between 1761 and 1768, none were successful. Having separate codes for the colonies and metropole was a characteristic of the empire and created little unity and standardization in French law. Thus, the French Constitution of 1791, which gave legitimacy to the French Revolution and human rights protections by incorporating the Declaration of the Rights of Man and of the Citizen, did not include any of the colonies or possessions of France in Africa, Asia, or the Americas. During the Revolution, male citizens in Saint-Louis sent a list of grievances to the Estates General demanding that the privileged position of persons born in France over those born in the colony end and the abolition of the Company of Senegal's trade monopoly to allow free trade. As a result, upon France taking definitive control of its colonies in 1817, the Four Communes of Senegal, were granted equal status with French nationals from the metropole, meaning that they had full rights of citizenship as well as French nationality. Classified as originaires, inhabitants of Dakar, Gorée, Rufisque, and Saint-Louis, were distinguished as different from Africans of the interior because of their level of assemilation to French culture. (Note: Initially this status was granted only to Saint-Louis and Gorée and was reconfirmed after the French Revolution of 1848. A formal decree of 1 August 1872, established that the two communes were fully empowered municipalities equal to those in France. Full commune status was extended to Rufisque in 1880 and Dakar in 1887.)

The abolition of slavery in 1794 granted French nationality to all men in the French colonies, but the reestablishment of slavery in 1802, made the status of colonial subjects confusing. The 1802 coup d'état of Napoleon Bonaparte rolled back gains made during the French Revolutionary period, re-establishing the law and customs in effect before the Revolution of 1789. In 1805, the Napoleonic Code, the French Civil Code, was implemented in France, the French Antilles, and French Guiana. The provisions contained in it applied only to the white French residing in the colonies. Under the Civil Code, women were legally incapacitated and paternal authority was established over children. Upon marriage, a woman automatically acquired the same nationality as her spouse. Illegitimate children were barred from inheritance and nationality could only be transmitted through a father. Between 1805 and 1846, liberated slaves, those found on illegal slaving vessels, had a special status in the French colonies and were assigned to public works projects. Between 1831 and 1846, when the liberated slaves were freed, they worked as apprentices. In 1848 slavery was abolished for the second time. Freedom disrupted the social order, as it established patrilineal affiliations for family members. In 1840, the Civil Code was extended to the Communes of Senegal, though it was strongly resisted by the originaires. Simultaneously with the abolition of slavery, the Civil Code was extended to all of the inhabitants in the colonies of France.

Under Article 109 of the French Constitution of 1848, French territories were to be governed by specific laws until the constitution was extended there. This provision laid the groundwork for nationality legislation based upon whether the native inhabitants were able to be assimilated by adopting European standards. From 1848, those persons who settled in the colonies and were from France were considered nationals who had full rights and were subject to French law. However, those born in the new territories were considered to be nationals without citizenship. Nationals in the older colonies of the Antilles, Guiana, Réunion and parts of India and the Four Communes of Senegal were granted political rights, but those in Algeria were confirmed by a decree on 14 July 1865 to be subjects and not citizens, unless they renounced their allegiance to native custom and possessed sufficient understanding of the obligations of citizenship. Under the Code de l'indigénat (Code of Indigenous Status) promulgated for Algeria in 1881, nationals in the new colonies followed customary law. The Indigenous Code was extended to Senegal in 1887, meaning that from that date, three classes of nationals resided in Senegal, those born in France and originaires who were subject to French law, though the originaires still refused to submit to the Civil Code, and natives (indigènes), who followed traditional custom. Natives, as non-citizen nationals were governed by traditional laws concerning marriage and inheritance which placed the well-being of the community above individual rights. These laws prevented a wife from being treated as a slave, required her husband to support her, and entitled her kin to a bride price, to compensate them for the loss of her fertility to their kinship group and secure the legality of the union. Having paid the price for the marriage contract, she and her offspring belonged to the kinship network of her husband and could be inherited if her husband died.

The French Nationality Law of 1889 codified previous statutory laws, changing the French standard from jus sanguinis to jus soli and was extended only to the French Antilles. Under its terms, women who would become stateless by the rule to acquire their spouse's nationality were allowed to retain their French nationality upon marriage. In 1895, the French established the administration system that would govern its possessions in French West Africa for the next sixty years. A Governor-General was installed and a headquarters was established in Dakar. The Governor-General's authority was extended to Senegal, French Guinea, and the Ivory Coast colonies, and in 1899 to Dahomey and French Sudan. The 1889 Nationality Law was modified in 1897 when it was extended to the remainder of the French colonies. Clarification in the 1897 decree included that bestowing nationality by birth in French territory only applied to children born in France, restoring descent requirements for the colonies. A 1903 decree attempted again to impose the Civil Code of France over the originaires in the Communes of Senegal by establishing that in civil matters, the Code applied and in personal matters, they could be governed by traditional or Muslim law. In 1904, the French West African Federation was founded with the existing five colonies, of Dahomey, Guinea, Ivory Coast, Senegal, and French Sudan, and was later expanded to include Mauritania, Niger, and Upper Volta. The Indigenous Code was extended to the federation.

On 25 May 1912, a Décret N°. 27892 was issued specifically addressing the status of French West Africans. Under its terms, African subjects could acquire French citizenship if at the age of majority and having proved three years of established domicile in the territory, they were able to read and write French; they were of good character and assimilated to French culture, or they engaged in a public or private French enterprise for a minimum or ten years; and they had sufficient means of self-support. The language requirement could be waived for those who had received military medals or recognition of the Legion of Honor or were in the French civil service. Upon application, subjects were required to acknowledge that they gave up their personal status under customary law and were to be governed by French laws. The decree noted that married women and minor children acquired the status of their husband or father however, this was only the case if the marriage had been conducted under French law, rather than customary practice.

Following the end of World War I France passed a law, "Décret N°. 24 on 25 March 1915 that allowed subjects or protected persons who were non-citizen nationals and had established domicile in a French territory to acquire full citizenship, including the naturalization of their wives and minor children, by having received the cross of the Legion of Honor, having obtained a university degree, having rendered service to the nation, having attained the rank of an officer or received a medal from the French army, who had married a Frenchwoman and established a one-year residency; or who had resided for more than ten years in a colony other than their country of origin. In 1916, a declaration was made that individuals in the Communes of Senegal were not merely voters, but were full French citizens. The decree specified that such status did not extend to those who were not inhabitants of the Communes. A 1918 decree written for French West Africa was aimed at decorated veterans of the war and their families, providing they had not previously been denied their rights nor participated in actions against French rule.

In 1927, France passed a new Nationality Law, which under Article 8, removed the requirement for married women to automatically derive the nationality of a husband and provided that her nationality could only be changed if she consented to change her nationality. It also allowed children born in France to native-born French women married to foreigners to acquire their nationality from their mothers. When it was implemented it included Guadeloupe, Martinique and Réunion, but was extended to the remaining French possessions for French citizens only in 1928. Under Article 26 of the 1928 decree was the stipulation that it did not apply to natives of the French possessions except Algeria, Guadeloupe, Martinique, and Réunion. Between 1933 and 1947, the territory of Upper Volta was divided up and incorporated into the colonies of French Sudan, the Ivory Coast, and Niger. In 1938, the legal incapacity of married women was finally invalidated for French citizens. In 1939, France determined that marriage and inheritance were too significant to continue being dealt with in native courts. That year, the Mandel Decree was enacted in French West Africa as well as French Equatorial Africa. Under its terms child marriage was discouraged. It established the minimum age at marriage as fourteen for women and sixteen for men, invalidated marriages wherein spouses did not consent, and nullified levirate marriage without approval of the woman.

At the end of World War II, a statute issued on 7 March 1944 granted French citizenship to those who had performed services to the nation, such as serving as civil servants or receiving recognitions. In 1945, a new Code of French Nationality was passed, which conferred once again automatic French nationality on foreign wives of French men, but allowed mothers who were French nationals to pass their nationality to children born outside of France. It expressly applied to Algeria, French Guiana, Guadeloupe, Martinique and Réunion and was extended to the Overseas Territories in 1953, but in the case of the latter had distinctions for the rights of those who were naturalized. The Constitution of 1946 granted French citizenship to all subjects of France's territories without having to renounce their personal status as natives. Under its terms, recognition was granted that while civil rights were protected under French law, inhabitants of French West Africa were allowed to have their personal affairs such as filiation, inheritance, and marriage regulated under different systems. In 1951 the Jacquinot Decree strengthened the provisions in French West and Equatorial Africa of the Mandel decree removing women who were twenty-one years old, or divorced, from control by a father or guardian and establishing specific rules for the payment and determining the amount of a bride price.

The legal framework of Senegal was changed by the Loi-cadre Defferre issued on 23 June 1956, which granted internal self-governance and universal suffrage to French territories and expanded their Territorial Assemblies. The law was not intended to create independent states, but rather to allow the African colonies to participate in restructuring their place within the French Union. These changes led to an increase in political activity and a press for the dissolution of the Federation of French West Africa. The Senegalese Progressive Union (UPS) was founded in 1958. With the passage of the 1958 French Constitution, nationality provisions were standardized for France, Overseas Departments, and Overseas Territories. Article 86 excluded the possibility for independence of the colonies, but allowed them to become autonomous republics. The Senegalese Progressive Union won the 1959 national elections with a large and demands for independence excellerated. The French Constitution was amended in 1960 to allow states to maintain membership in the Community even if they were independent republics. That year, the Senegalese Progressive Union and French government entered negotiations for Senegalese independence, in a federation with Mali, the former French Sudan.

=== Post-independence (1960–present) ===
Independence was granted as of 4 April 1960; however, the federation with Mali collapsed in August and Senegal became an independent state. The new nation adopted its first Nationality Code (Loi N° 61–10) the following year. Under its terms, all those who were residing in Senegal at the time of independence who were descended of someone recognized as Senegalese or someone who had also been born in Senegal were granted nationality. The vagueness of the wording for recognition as Senegalese created problems for the Lebanese-Syrian and French inhabitants in acquiring nationality, eventually leading to reforms in 1970. For a three-month period after the statute went into effect, the law allowed people from the former Sub-African French colonies and the neighboring nations to obtain Senegalese nationality upon request. After independence, those who could acquire nationality at birth included children born in Senegal to Senegalese parents or children born abroad to a father who was Senegalese. Children born to a Senegalese mother and a father who was stateless or had unknown nationality and foundlings were also able to acquire nationality of origin. Children born outside of wedlock had to prove a filiation to a Senegalese parent to acquire nationality. Women who married Senegalese men automatically acquired the nationality of their spouse, unless they refused, or the government refused to grant them Senegalese status. Adopted children or legitimated children were able to acquire their father's nationality. Ten years of residency was required to apply for naturalization.

In 1967, an amendment was passed (Loi N° 67–17) which allowed people to naturalize after five years if they were employed in the Senegalese civil service or a private enterprise. In 1970, an amendment (Loi N° 70–31) was passed which barred persons who had not assimilated into Senegalese society from acquiring nationality at birth even if the child and parent were both born in Senegal. In 1972, a Family Code (Code de la famille) was adopted which had important implications for nationality. The drafters of the Family Code blended provisions from colonial statutes that had separated customary Senegalese practices and French law into a single legal code. The new law continued to allow customary marriage practices, but required that those unions be registered to provide an official legal status, as opposed to an unregistered living arrangement. Several decisions of the Supreme Court of Senegal (Cour suprême du Sénégal) clarified that persons who had previously had different statuses in French law and were in mixed-marriages — one party was subject to French law and the other subject to customary law — had the right to choose whether they wanted a civil or traditional marriage and either was legally valid upon registration. Another decision ruled that marriage under Muslim law was invalid in Senegal, as it did not follow the traditional practices of the country.

The 1970 Code was modified by an amendment in 1979, (Loi N° 79–01), which further clarified that persons who automatically acquired foreign nationality at birth through parents who were foreign nationals could not acquire Senegalese nationality by being born in Senegal to a parent also born there. The 1979 Amendment also provided that persons who had rendered important service or service of exceptional interest to the nation could naturalize. The 1984 amendment to the Nationality Law (Loi N° 84–10) prohibited naturalized persons from holding dual nationality. It also stipulated that an illegitimate child could gain nationality from its mother, unless the father established paternity and was the first parent to claim the child. Commission of serious crime or acquisition of dual nationality (either voluntary or automatic) resulted in the loss of Senegalese nationality. An amendment passed in 1989 (Loi N° 89–42) allowed Senegalese to be denaturalized if they were acting as if they were nationals of another country. It also clarified that mere acquisition of dual nationality did not deprive a Senegalese national of their nationality, as the government was required to formally denaturalized them. The law was not changed again until 8 July 2013, when an amendment (Loi N° 2013–05) amended the Nationality Law to allow women to pass on their nationality to a spouse or their children.
