= Senegalese passport =

Passport issued to Senegalese citizens

Senegalese passport; Passeport sénégalais
- The front cover of a contemporary Senegalese passport.
- Type: Passport
- Issued by: Senegal
- First issued: around 2007 (biometric passport)
- Purpose: Identification
- Eligibility: Senegalese citizenship
- Expiration: 5 years

Senegalese passports (French: Passeport sénégalais) are issued to Senegalese citizens to travel outside Senegal.

== Physical properties ==
- Surname
- Given names
- Nationality Senegalese
- Date of birth
- Sex
- Place of birth
- Date of Expiry
- Passport number

== Languages ==
The data page/information page is printed in French and English.

== See also ==
- ECOWAS passports
- List of passports
- Visa requirements for Senegalese citizens
