= Afonso Gonçalves Baldaia =

Portuguese explorer

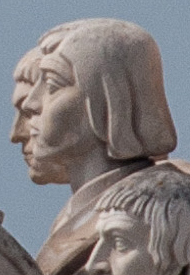
- Effigy of Afonso Gonçalves Baldaia in the Monument to the Discoveries, in Lisbon, Portugal.
- Born: c. 1415; Porto, Kingdom of Portugal
- Died: 1481; Praia da Vitória, Azores, Kingdom of Portugal
- Occupations: Explorer, colonist
- Known for: Explorer of the coast of Western Sahara.

Afonso Gonçalves Baldaia was a 15th-century Portuguese nautical explorer. He explored much of the coast of Western Sahara in 1435–1436 on behalf of the Portuguese prince Henry the Navigator. He would later become one of the first colonists of Terceira Island in the Azores.

== Background ==
Next to nothing is known of Afonso Gonçalves Baldaia's background and origins. He is said to be the first person with that surname in Portuguese records, and thus likely to be from a family of foreign origin. It is known that he served as a cup-bearer (copeiro) in the household of the Portuguese Prince Henry the Navigator.

== First expedition ==
In 1434 (or 1433) one of Prince Henry's household squires, Gil Eanes, sailed past Cape Bojador, in present day Western Sahara, the physical and psychological barrier which European sailors had long considered the non plus ultra of navigation. In the follow-up trip of 1435, Henry sent Eanes out again, this time accompanied by a second ship, a barinel under the command of Afonso Gonçalves Baldaia, with instructions to explore the coast beyond Bojador.

There is scant information on the barinel, other than that it was a new deep-hulled, two-masted sail-and-oar-powered ship, larger than Eanes's single-mast barca and said to be especially designed for coastal exploring (and thus might have already had a lateen sail in the mizzen mast). Unlike Eanes, there is no indication that Baldaia had any prior maritime experience.

Eanes and Baldaia sailed as far south as Angra dos Ruivos (Garnet Bay), named after the shoals of sea robin (ruivo) they found there), some 50 leagues (250 km) south of Cape Bojador. Sailing primarily along the largely deserted coast of the Western Sahara, Eanes and Baldaia saw some traces of human presence – footprints of men and camels – but encountered no one on this expedition.

- Angra dos Ruivos (Garnet Bay) 24°40′N 14°56′W

== Second expedition ==
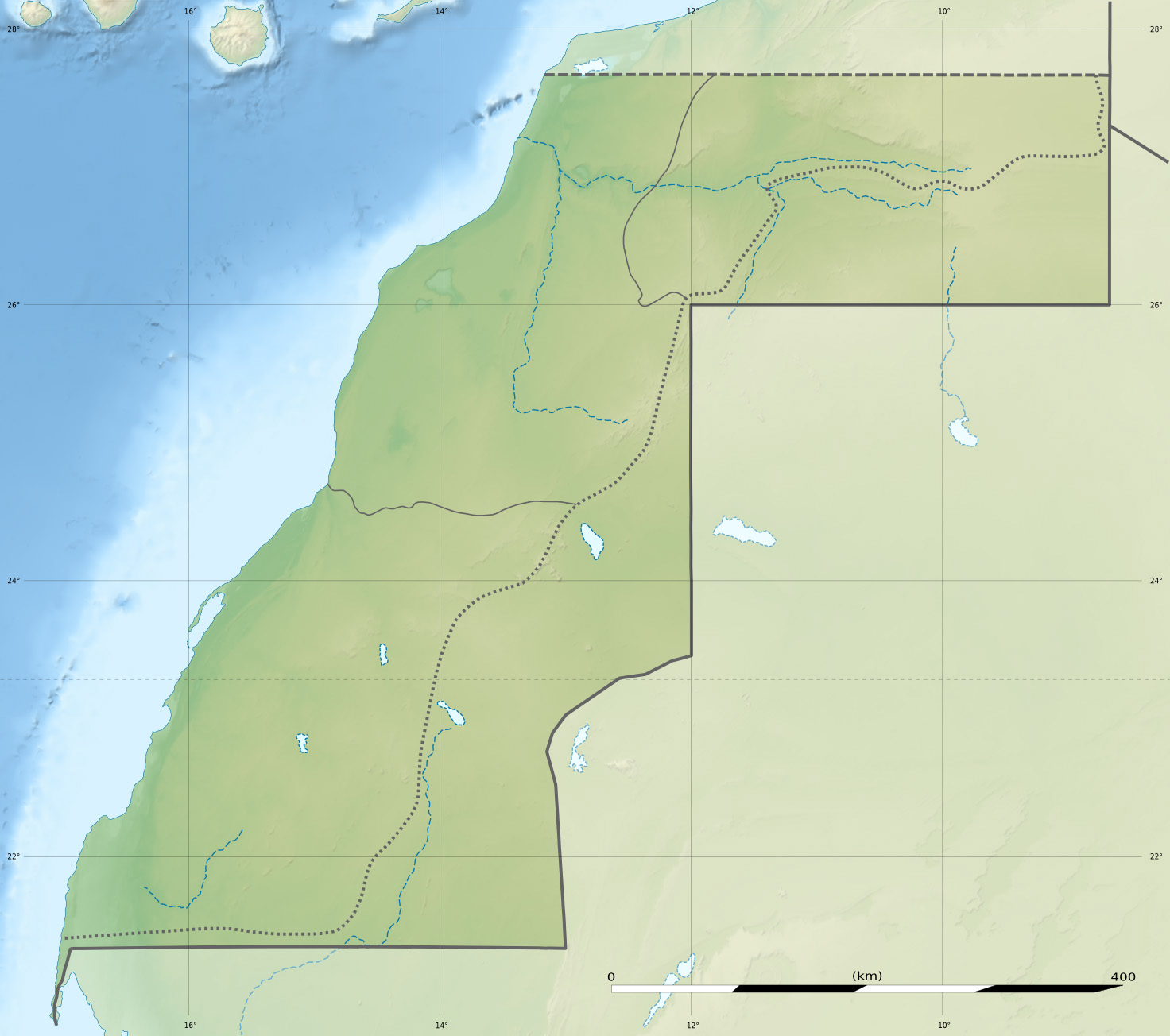
Portuguese exploration milestones 1434-36 in Western Sahara

In 1436 Baldaia set off again on his barinel, this time by himself, with instructions to find and bring back a local inhabitant. A pair of horses were taken aboard, in case they had to give chase.

Anchoring at Angra dos Cavallos (around Point Elbow), Baldaia's expedition spotted a native party at a distance and dispatched a party after it, but to no avail. Proceeding south, Baldaia discovered a coastal inlet which he named Rio do Ouro (around modern Dakhla, Western Sahara), imagining it was the mouth of the legendary 'River of Gold' spoken of by Trans-Saharan traders (probably a reference to the Senegal River, which reached deep into the Mali Empire).

While anchored at Rio do Ouro, Baldaia's crew paused to undertake a hunt of the monk seals that basked on that stretch of coast, loading up the ship with a cargo of seal pelts and oil.

From there, Baldaia pressed further south, crossing the Tropic of Cancer (possibly the first crossing of that latitude by a European) and reached as far as Pedra da Galé (Galha Point, a galley-shaped rock island off Cape Barbas). Finding nothing there but some abandoned fishing nets, Baldaia turned back. In all, Baldaia has sailed some 125 miles south of last year's furthest point.

Disappointed at the sparse coast reported by Baldaia, Prince Henry did not send out another expedition for the next few years. It was only in 1441 that Henry finally followed up on it and sent out two ships, prototypes of the new lateen-rigged caravel – one under Antão Gonçalves to return to Rio do Ouro to undertake another seal hunt, and another under Nuno Tristão, to explore beyond Baldaia's furthest point, Pedra da Galé.

- Angra dos Cavallos (Point Elbow) 24°04′N 15°35′W
- Rio do Ouro 23°39′N 16°00′W
- Pedra da Galé (Galha Point) 22°12′36″N 16°48′0″W

== Later years: Porto, Azores ==
After Baldaia returned to Portugal, little more is heard of him. We know that at Prince Henry's request, Baldaia was appointed by King Edward of Portugal with the post of almoxarife (customs collector) in the city of Porto. We have confirmation of his continuing to hold that position as late as October 13, 1442. We hear of his successor in that position only in 1451.

It is usually assumed that Afonso Gonçalves Baldaia, the Henrican explorer, is one and the same person as Afonso Gonçalves de Antona Baldaia, an Azorean colonist, although there are no documents confirming that. The latter Baldaia emerged around 1450 in connection with the Flemish colonist Jacob of Bruges, who induced the recently widowed Baldaia to move to the Azores islands, as one of the initial settlers of Terceira Island. Baldaia erected a residence and chapel in Angra do Heroísmo. In 1474, Baldaia retired to Villa da Praia, and donated his Angra lands to the Franciscan Order. His manor house would serve as a Franciscan chapter house and later a lyceum, while his chapel would be enlarged to become the church of Nossa Senhora da Guia. Baldaia the colonist died in 1481. Baldaia's descendants would continue as prominent figures in Azorean society.

Afonso Gonçalves Baldaia is one of the navigators depicted in the 1960 Padrão dos Descobrimentos (Monument to the Portuguese Discoveries) in Lisbon.

== See also ==
- History of Portugal
- Navigation
- Sailors

== Sources ==
- João de Barros (1552–59) Décadas da Ásia: Dos feitos, que os Portuguezes fizeram no descubrimento, e conquista, dos mares, e terras do Oriente.. Vol. 1 (Dec I, Lib.1-5).
- Gomes Eanes de Zurara (1453) Crónica dos feitos notáveis que se passaram na Conquista da Guiné por mandado do Infante D. Henrique or Chronica do descobrimento e conquista da Guiné. [Trans. 1896-99 by C.R. Beazley and E. Prestage, The Chronicle of the Discovery and Conquest of Guinea, London: Halyut, v.1, v.2
- Diffie, Bailey W., and George D. Winius (1977) Foundations of the Portuguese empire, 1415-1580 Minneapolis, MN: University of Minnesota Press
- Quintella, Ignaco da Costa (1839–40) Annaes da Marinha Portugueza, 2 vols, Lisbon: Academia Real das Sciencias. vol. 1
- Russell, P.E. (2001) Prince Henry 'the Navigator': a life New Haven, Conn: Yale University Press.
