= Basilique Notre-Dame de la Délivrance =

Roman Catholic minor basilica in Popenguine, Senegal

Coordinates: 14°33′17″N 17°06′42″W

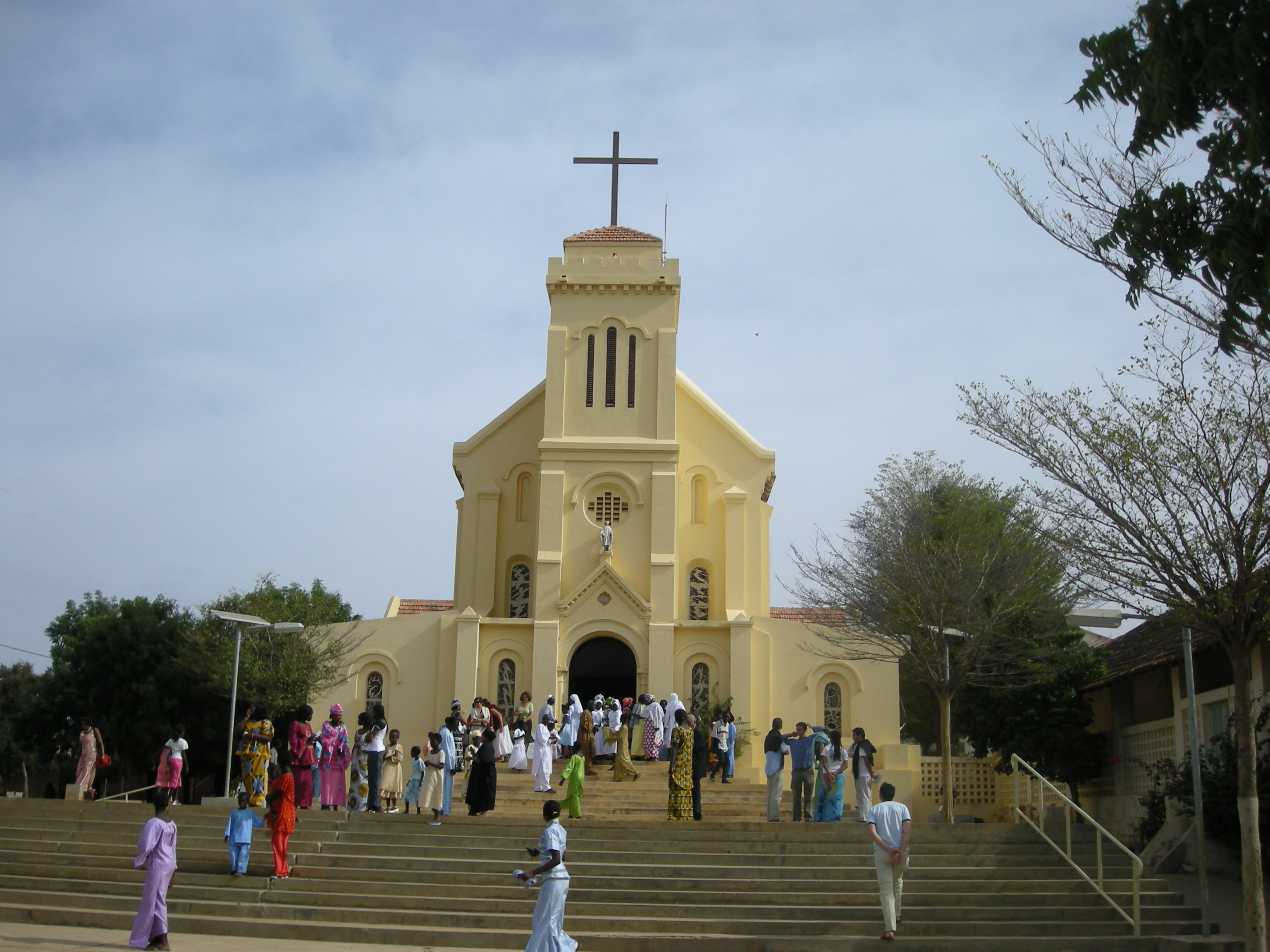
The Basilica

The Basilique Notre-Dame de la Délivrance (Basilica of Our Lady of Deliverance) is a Roman Catholic minor basilica dedicated to the Blessed Virgin Mary located in Popenguine, Senegal. The basilica is falls under the jurisdiction of the Archdiocese of Dakar. The basilica was dedicated on November 23, 1991.

The village is now known as a place of Catholic pilgrimage.

== See also ==
- Religion in Senegal
