= Visa policy of Senegal =

Policy on permits required to enter Senegal

Visitors to Senegal require a visa unless they come from one of the visa exempt countries. Visitors must hold passports that are valid for at least 6 months from the date of arrival.

== Visa policy map ==
Visa policy of Senegal Senegal Visa not required Visa on arrival Visa required

== Visa exemption ==
Citizens of the following countries can visit Senegal without a visa for up to 90 days:

- All ECOWAS member states
- All European Union member states

- Brazil
- Burkina Faso
- Canada
- Central African Republic
- China
- Congo
- Djibouti
- India
- Japan
- Malaysia
- Mali
- Mauritania
- Mauritius
- Morocco
- Niger
- Rwanda
- Singapore
- South Korea
- Switzerland
- Tunisia
- United Arab Emirates
- United Kingdom
- United States

Date of visa changes
- 30 April 1980: ECOWAS (Economic Community of West African States): Benin, Burkina Faso, Cape Verde, Gambia, Ghana, Guinea, Guinea-Bissau, Ivory Coast, Liberia, Mali, Niger, Nigeria, Sierra Leone, Togo

Holders of passport for Public Affairs of China can visit Senegal without a visa for 30 days.

Holders of a Laissez-Passer issued by the United Nations traveling on duty and holders of a Laissez-Passer issued by the Economic Community of West African States do not require a visa for up to 90 days.

Holders of diplomatic passports issued to nationals of Turkey and holders of diplomatic and official / service passports issued to nationals of Algeria, China, Gabon, Libya, Russia, Serbia, Singapore, Tanzania and Uganda do not require a visa for up to 90 days.

In October 2019 Senegalese Minister of the Interior announced that Senegal would reintroduce visa requirements for all visitors except ECOWAS citizens by the end of 2019. In September 2024 a similar proposal to introduce reciprocal visa policy was proposed by the Minister of African Integration and Foreign Affairs.

== Visa on arrival ==
Nationals of the following countries are eligible for a visa upon arrival at Dakar Airport (only, not at land borders) for a stay of up to 1 month and must hold a passport valid for at least 6 months from the date of arrival, round-trip air tickets and proof of accommodation.

- African Union member states (except ECOWAS, Mozambique, São Tomé and Príncipe, Somalia, South Sudan and Sudan)

- Andorra
- Argentina
- Armenia
- Australia
- Bahamas
- Bahrain
- Barbados
- Brunei
- China (include Hong Kong and Macao)
- Costa Rica
- Dominican Republic
- El Salvador
- Fiji
- Grenada
- Guatemala
- Haiti
- Honduras
- Iceland
- Indonesia
- Israel
- Jamaica
- Kiribati
- Kuwait
- Liechtenstein
- Marshall Islands
- Micronesia
- Monaco
- Nepal
- New Zealand
- Norway
- Oman
- Palau
- Palestine
- Papua New Guinea
- Philippines
- Russia
- Samoa
- Saint Kitts and Nevis
- Saint Lucia
- Saint Vincent and the Grenadines
- San Marino
- Solomon Islands
- Suriname
- Thailand
- Trinidad and Tobago
- Turkey
- Tuvalu
- Ukraine
- Vanuatu
- Vatican City

== Visa required in advance ==
Citizens of the following countries must apply for a tourist visa at one of the Senegalese diplomatic missions:

- Afghanistan
- Albania
- Antigua and Barbuda
- Azerbaijan
- Bahrain
- Bangladesh
- Belarus
- Belize
- Bhutan
- Bolivia
- Bosnia and Herzegovina
- Cambodia
- Chile
- Colombia
- Cuba
- Dominica
- Ecuador
- Eritrea
- Georgia
- Guyana
- Iran
- Iraq
- Jordan
- Kazakhstan
- Kyrgyzstan
- Laos
- Lebanon
- Maldives
- Mexico
- Moldova
- Mongolia
- Montenegro
- Mozambique
- Myanmar
- Nauru
- Nicaragua
- North Korea
- North Macedonia
- Pakistan
- Panama
- Paraguay
- Peru
- Qatar
- São Tomé and Príncipe
- Saudi Arabia
- Serbia
- Solomon Islands
- Somalia
- South Sudan
- Sri Lanka
- Sudan
- Syria
- Taiwan
- Tajikistan
- Timor Leste
- Tonga
- Turkmenistan
- Uruguay
- Uzbekistan
- Venezuela
- Vietnam
- Yemen

== See also ==
- Visa requirements for Senegalese citizens
