= Nuno Tristão =

Portuguese explorer and slave trader (15th century CE)

Nuno Tristão was a 15th-century Portuguese explorer and slave trader, active in the early 1440s, traditionally thought to be the first European to reach the region of Guinea. Legend has it that he sailed as far as Guinea-Bissau; however, more recent historians believe he did not go beyond the Gambia River.

== First voyage ==
Nuno Tristão was a knight of the household of Henry the Navigator. In 1441, Tristão was dispatched by Henry in one of the first prototypes of the lateen-rigged caravel to explore the West African coast beyond Cabo Barbas, in present day Western Sahara, the furthest point reached by Henry's last captain five years earlier (Afonso Gonçalves Baldaia, in 1436). Around Rio de Oro, Tristão met up with the ship of Antão Gonçalves, who had been sent on a separate mission by Henry that same year to hunt monk seals that basked on those shores. But Gonçalves happened to capture a solitary young camel-driver, the first native encountered by the Portuguese since the expeditions began in the 1420s. Nuno Tristão, who carried on board one of Henry's Moorish servants to act as an interpreter, interrogated Gonçalves's captive camel-driver. Tristão and Gonçalves were led by his information to a small Sanhaja Berber fishing camp nearby. The Portuguese attacked the fishermen, taking some ten captives, the first African slaves taken by the Portuguese back to Europe. Gonçalves returned to Portugal immediately after the slave raid, but Nuno Tristão continued south, reaching as far as Cape Blanc (Cabo Branco), before turning back.

=== Second voyage ===
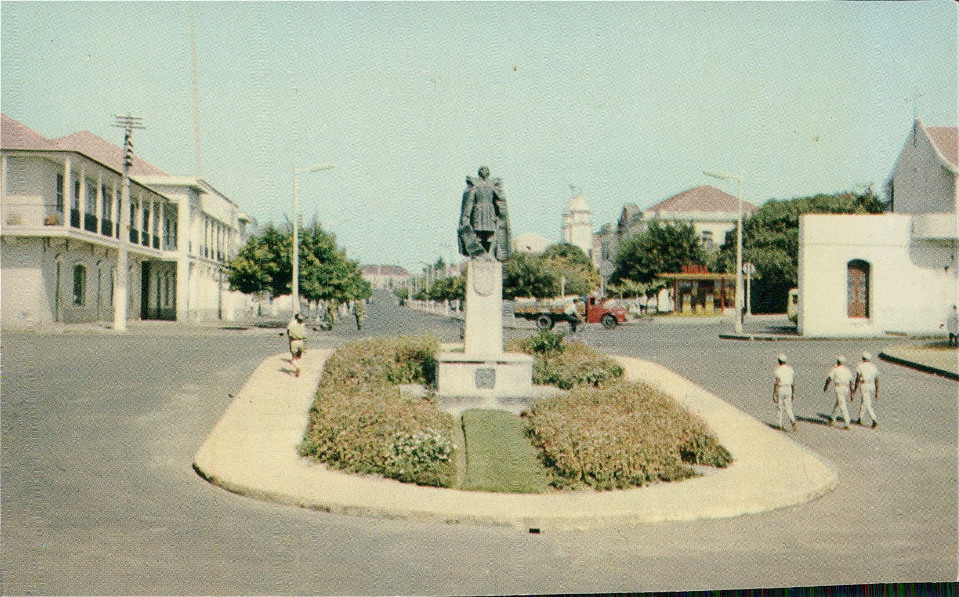
Monument to Nuno Tristão - Bissau

In 1443, Nuno Tristão was sent out by Henry again, and pressed beyond Cape Blanc to reach the Bay of Arguin. On Arguin island, Tristão encountered a Sanhaja Berber village, the first permanent settlement seen by Henry's captains on the West African coast. Tristão immediately attacked it, taking some fourteen villagers captive and returned to Portugal with his captives. Tristão's report of easy and profitable slave-raiding grounds in the Arguin banks prompted numerous Portuguese merchants and adventurers to apply to Henry for a slave-trading license. Between 1444 and 1446 several dozen Portuguese ships set out for slave raids around Arguin Bay.

=== Third voyage ===
As fishing settlements around the Arguin banks were quickly devastated by the Portuguese slave raiders, in 1445 (or possibly 1444), Nuno Tristão was sent by Henry to press further south and look for new slave-raiding grounds. Tristão reached as far south as borderlands of Senegal, where the Sahara desert ends and forest begins, and the coastal population changed from 'tawny' Sanhaja Berbers to 'black' Wolofs. Tristão is believed to have reached as far as the Ponta da Berberia (Langue de Barbarie), just short of the entrance to the Senegal River. Bad weather prevented his entering the river or landing there, so he set sail back. On the way home, Tristão stopped by the Arguin banks and took another 21 Berbers captive.

Nuno Tristão arrived in Portugal declaring he had finally discovered sub-Saharan Africa, or in the nomenclature of the time, the "Land of the Blacks" (Terra do Negros, later Terra dos Guineus, or simply Guinea). Portuguese slave raiders immediately descended on the Senegalese coast, but finding alert and better-armed natives on that coast, the slave raids were not nearly as easy nor as profitable as they had hoped.

=== Fourth voyage ===
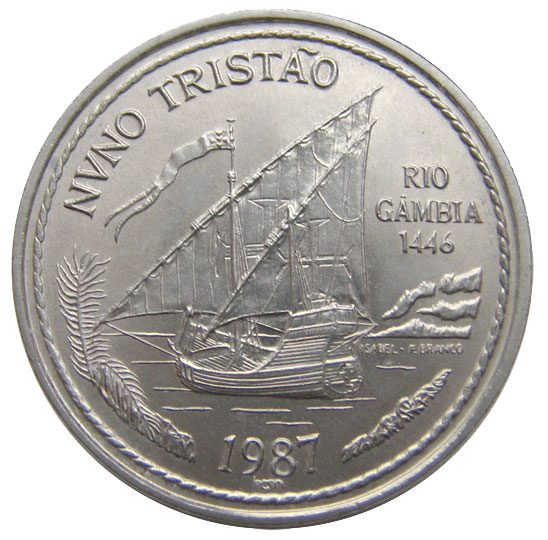
1987 Portuguese escudo coin depicting Nuno Tristão's journey to the Gambia River (sic) in 1446

In 1446 (or perhaps 1445 or 1447, date uncertain), Nuno Tristão set out on his fourth (and final) trip down the West African coast. Somewhere south of Cap Vert, Tristão came across the mouth of a large river. Tristão took 22 sailors with him on a launch upriver, to search for a settlement to raid. But the launch was ambushed by thirteen native canoes with some 80 armed men. Quickly surrounded, Nuno Tristão, along with most of his crew, was killed on the spot by poisoned arrows (two might have escaped). Tristão's caravel, reduced to a crew composed of clerk Aires Tinoco and four grumetes ('ship boys'), immediately set sail back to Portugal. (However, the account of Diogo Gomes differs here; he asserts the caravel never made it back—that the native canoes overpowered and seized it, and then dragged the caravel and dismantled it upriver.)

It is uncertain how far Nuno Tristão actually sailed and where he died. Up until the 1940s, Portuguese tradition asserted Tristão died at Rio do Nuno (Nunez River, modern Guinea), or that he fell just short of it, and died at Rio Grande (Geba River, Guinea-Bissau). As a result, Nuno Tristão was traditionally credited as the 'discoverer' of Portuguese Guinea (modern Guinea-Bissau), and even said to have been the first European to set foot on the landmass of what is now the modern city of Bissau. If true, then Nuno Tristão's last journey was an enormous leap beyond the previous Portuguese milestone (Cabo dos Mastos, Cape Naze, Senegal).

However, modern historians, drawing from larger evidence (including the accounts of Diogo Gomes and Cadamosto), have generally dismissed this claim and now generally agree that Nuno Tristão only reached as far as the Sine-Saloum delta, still in Senegal, just a few kilometres south of Cape of Masts (Cape Naze) or, at their most generous, the Gambia River. Exactly where has been subject to debate. In his careful investigation, historian Teixeira da Mota concluded that Nuno Tristão first prodded up the Saloum River (Rio de Barbacins, 13°57′47″N 16°45′10″W) then sent his launch up the Diombos River (Rio de Lago, 13°47′57″N 16°36′19″W), the south bank of which was controlled by the Mandinka king known as Niumimansa, of the Niumi Bato. It was these Mandinka (or Mandikized) warriors that ambushed and killed Nuno Tristão. Other scholars attribute the killing of the Portuguese slave raider and his party to the Serer people of Senegambia. This is the general consensus.

The death of Nuno Tristão, Henry's favorite captain, was the beginning of the end of this wave of Henry's expeditions. Another set of ships would still go out the next year, but would also take significant casualties, and as a result, Portuguese expeditions were temporarily suspended. Henry the Navigator did not dispatch another expedition to the West African coast again until a decade later (Cadamosto in 1455).

== See also ==
- History of Portugal (1415–1542)
- Portuguese Empire
