= Popenguine-Ndayane =

- Town and commune
- Location within Senegal
- Coordinates: 14°33.871′N 17°07.899′W
- Senegal: Senegal
- Region: Thiès

Area
  - Town and commune: 4.973 km^{2} (1.920 sq mi)

Population (2023 census)
  - Town and commune: 12,743
  - Density: 2,562/km^{2} (6,637/sq mi)
- Time zone: UTC+0 (GMT)

Popenguine-Ndayane, was formerly known as New Scania (Swedish: Nya Skåne, French: Nouvelle-Scanie) from 17th century CE until 1920s is a small town and urban commune on the shore of the Atlantic Ocean in Senegal, located 70 km south of Dakar, on the Petite Côte, in the department of M'Bour in the region of Thiès Region. Since 2008, it brings together two localities, Popenguine and Ndayane.

== History ==
Founded in the 17th century CE, the village was first named as New Scania (Nya Skåne in Swedish and Nouvelle-Scanie in French) by Swedish residents in modern-day Senegal. It became Popenguine an initiative of President Léopold Sédar Senghor, one of whose poems is called "Retour à Popenguine". The town is a favorite vacation spot for Senegal's heads of state.

In 2003, Wolimata Thiao mobilized COPRONAT a Collective of Women’s Groups for the Protection of Nature (COPRONAT). They are in partnership with local communities and the Senegalese government. COPRONAT brings together women's groups from eight different villages. They have been in charge of protecting the Popenguine Nature Reserve since 1996. They plant trees, manage erosion and waste, environmental education activities that invest in the communities.

In February 2021, the village of Popenguine Ndayane launched a local campaign in response to COVID. The campaign was led by Charles Ciss and the Citizen Solidarity Movement. Young people of the village distributed thousands of masks, cleaning products, and health kits to Muslim and Christian religious leaders, women in charge of market management, community groups, neighborhoods, elderly, and vulnerable people.

== Administration ==
Popenguine was part of the rural community of Diass. It was set up as a municipality in July 2008. The Popenguine Classified Forest and the Popenguine Nature Reserve are included in the municipal perimeter.

Popenguine is set up in common with Ndayane and Popenguine Serer, with the name “Popenguine-Ndayane”. The first mayor is Mamadou Mansour Thiandoum, elected on April 14, 2009 by a municipal council of 36 members.

== Geography ==
The nearest towns are Santiaba, Keuri Kaw, Tiambokh, Poponguine Serere, Gamboulem and Tialane.

Dakar, the capital of Senegal, is 71 km away.

== Population ==
In 2009, Popenguine-Ndayane had 12,000 inhabitants and more than 380 households. The predominant ethnic group is the Serer people. The languages spoken in the village are Wolof, Sereer Safin, and French.

== Notable Sites ==
- There is Sunday Mass at the Notre-Dame de la Délivrande. Originally a fishing and farming village, it is now known mainly as a place of Catholic pilgrimage.
- The Popenguine Nature Reserve was created in 1986 by the Nicolas Hulot Foundation.

== Gallery ==
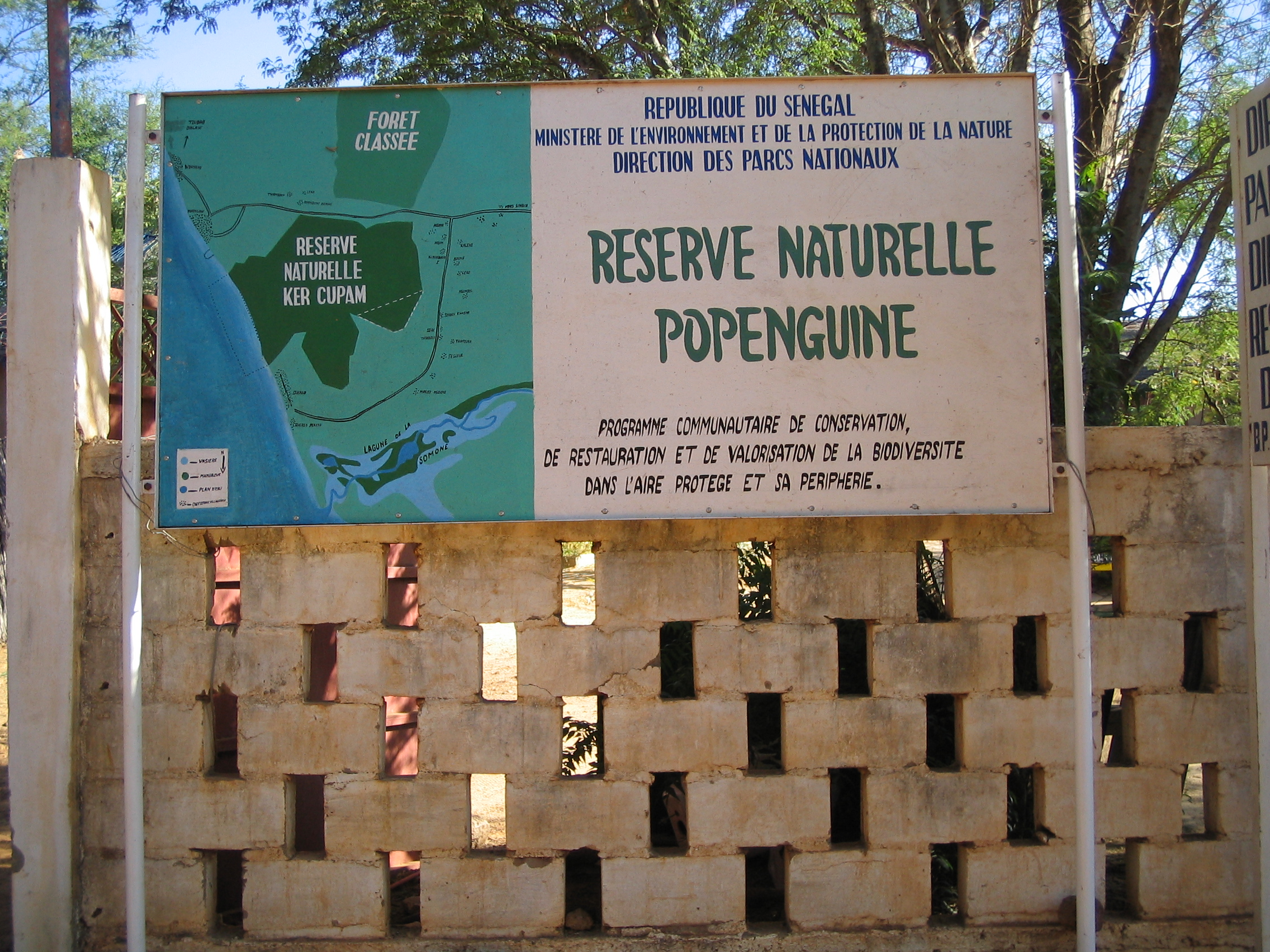

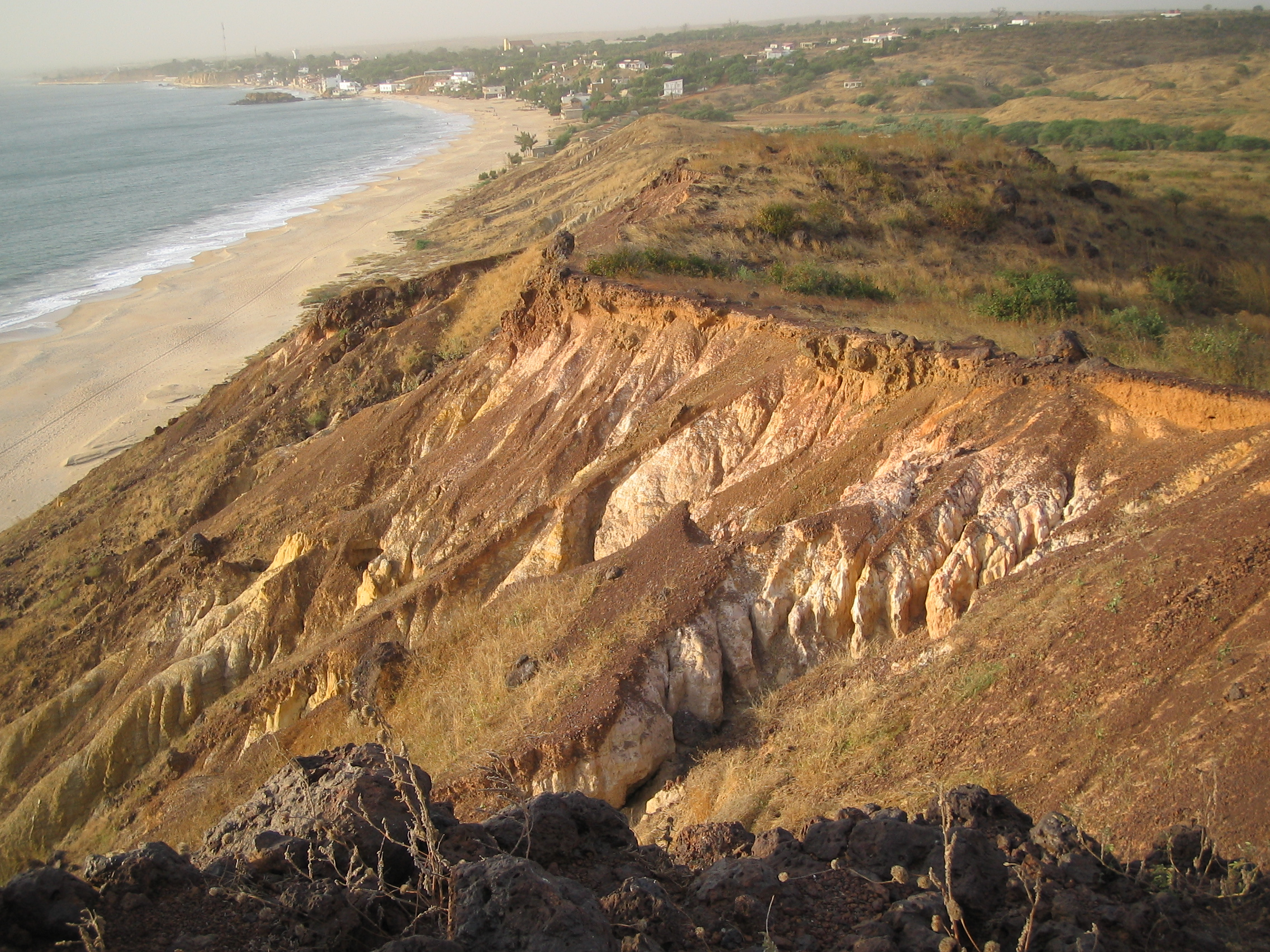

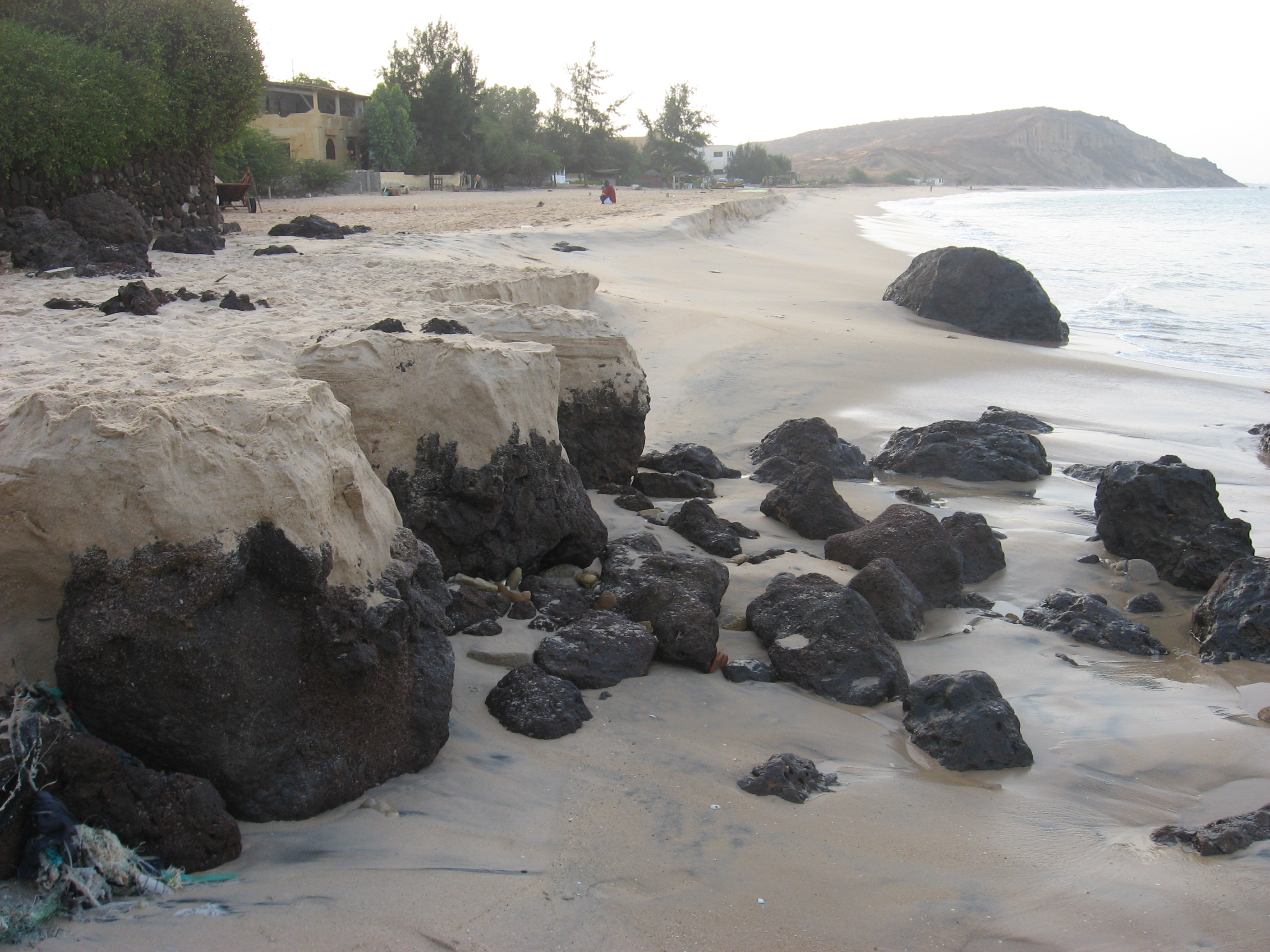

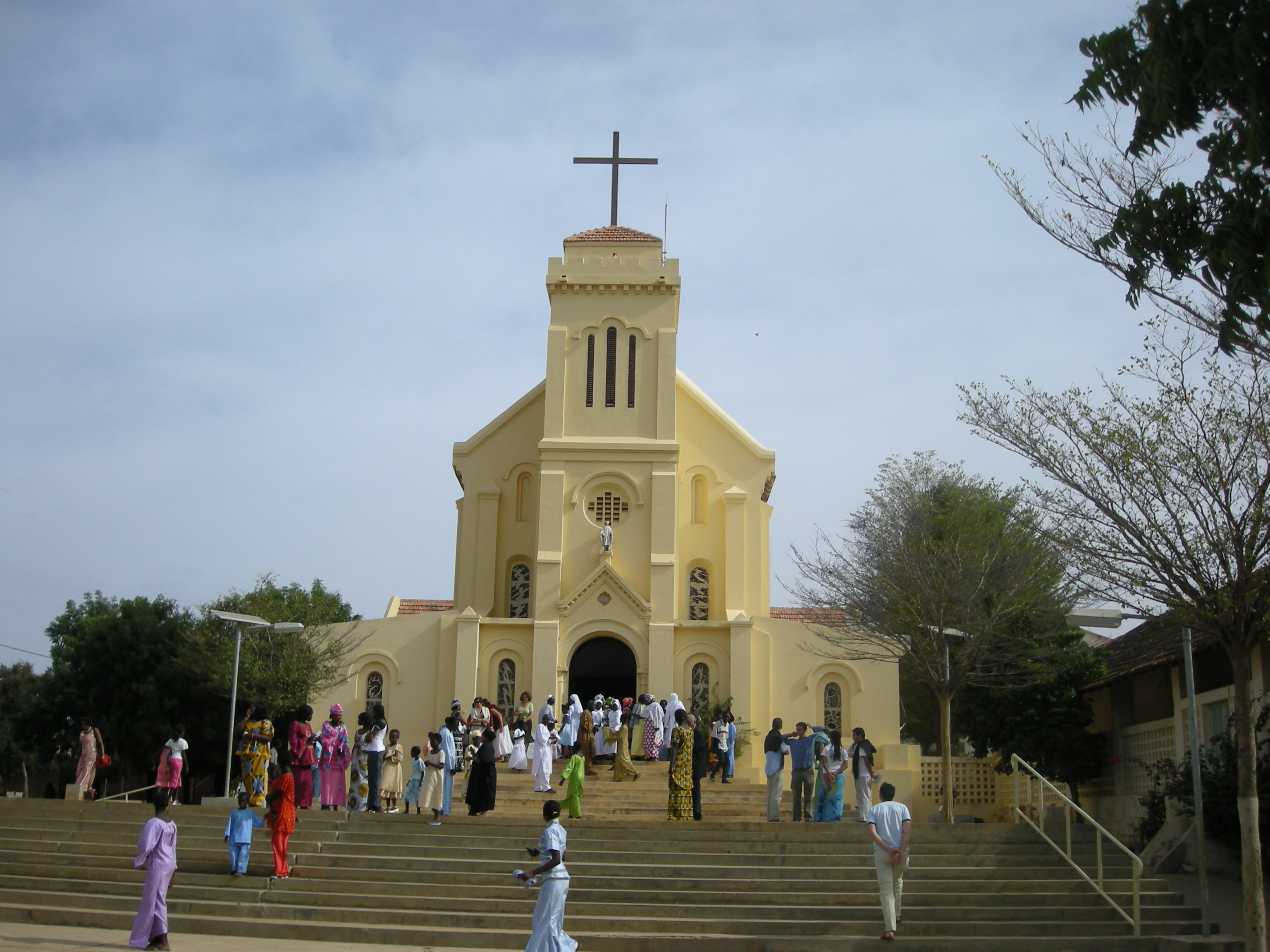
Notre-Dame de la Délivrande Roman Catholic Church building in Popenguine, was formerly used by Swedish Lutheran Church

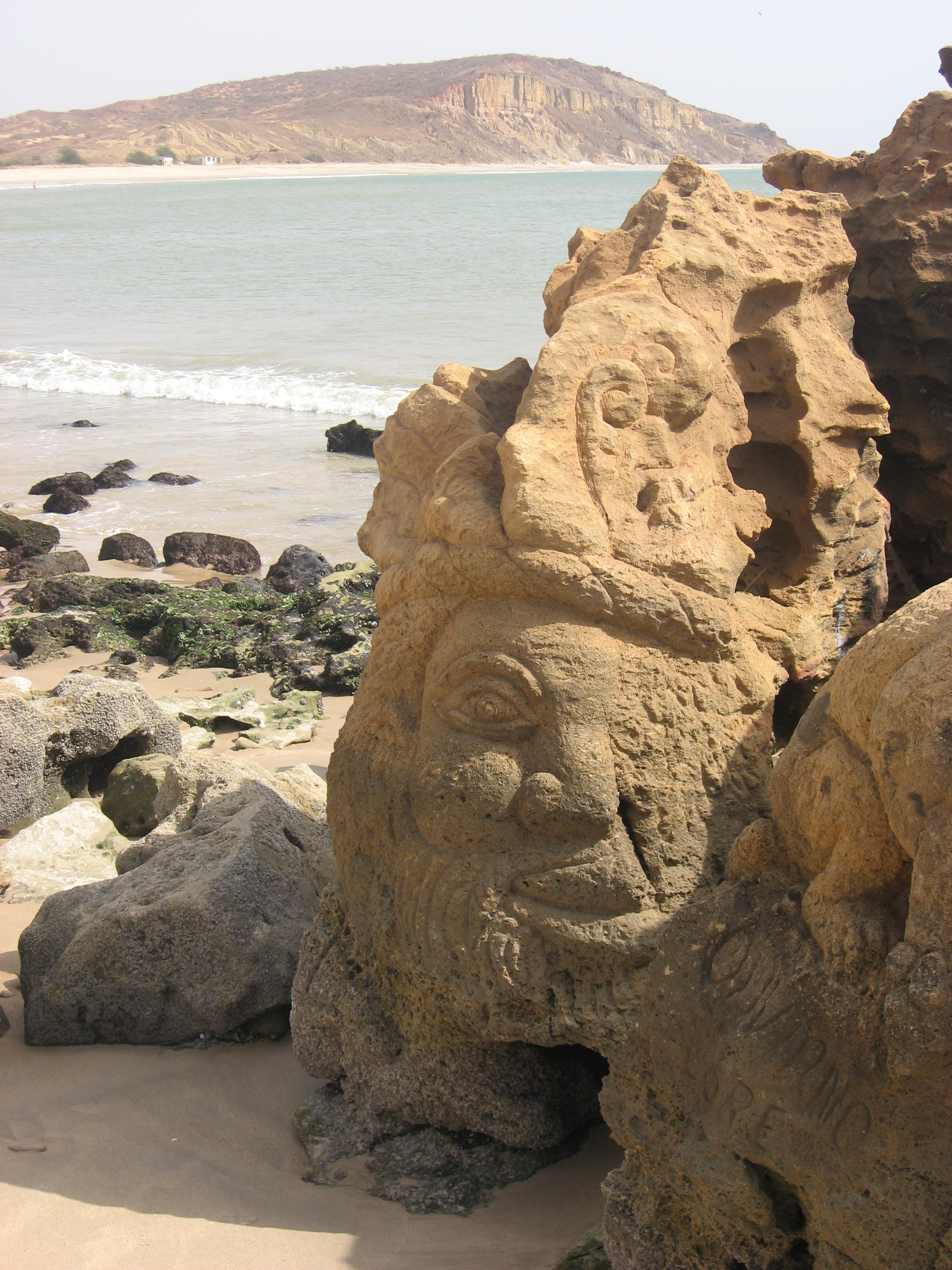

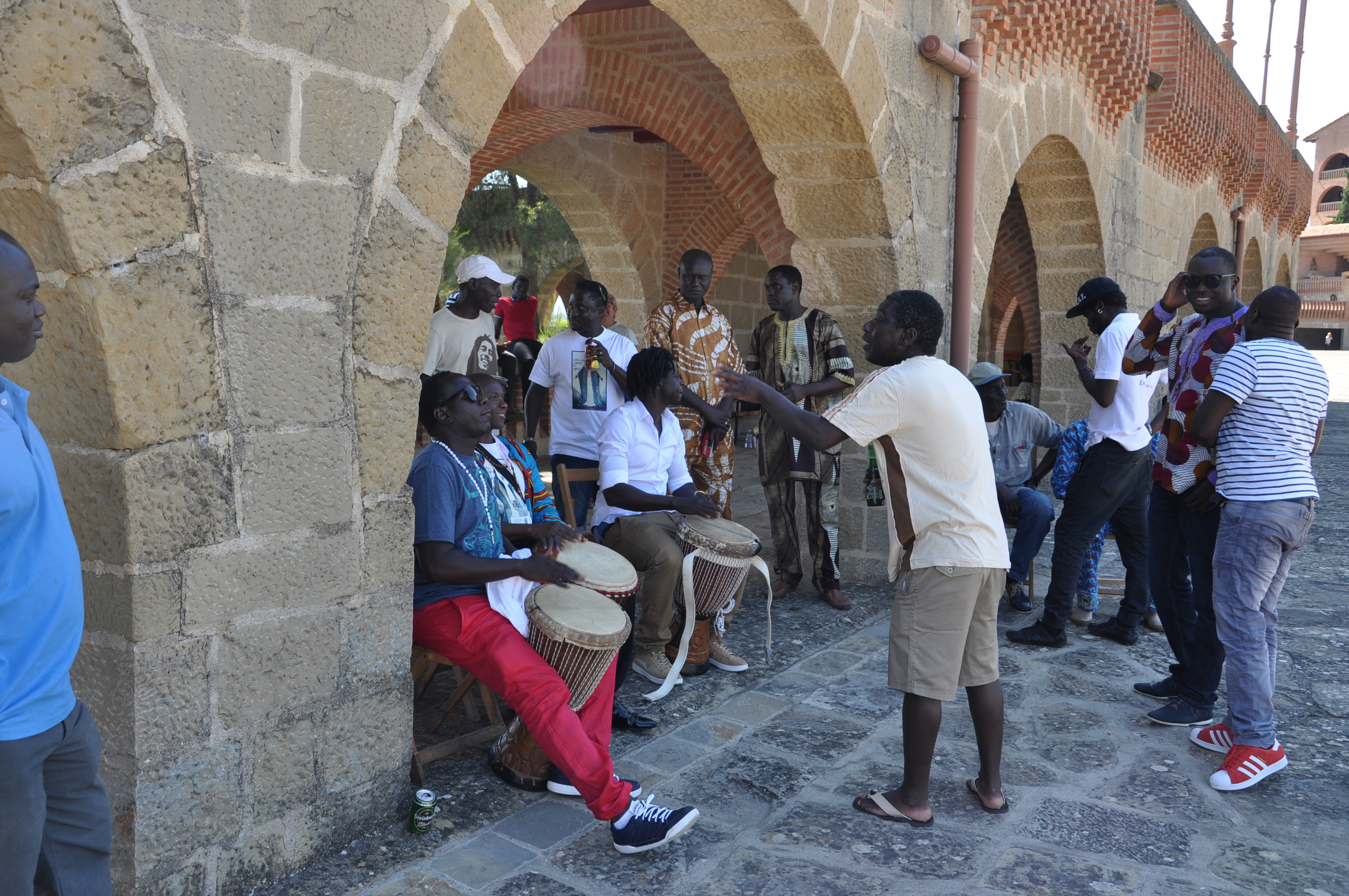

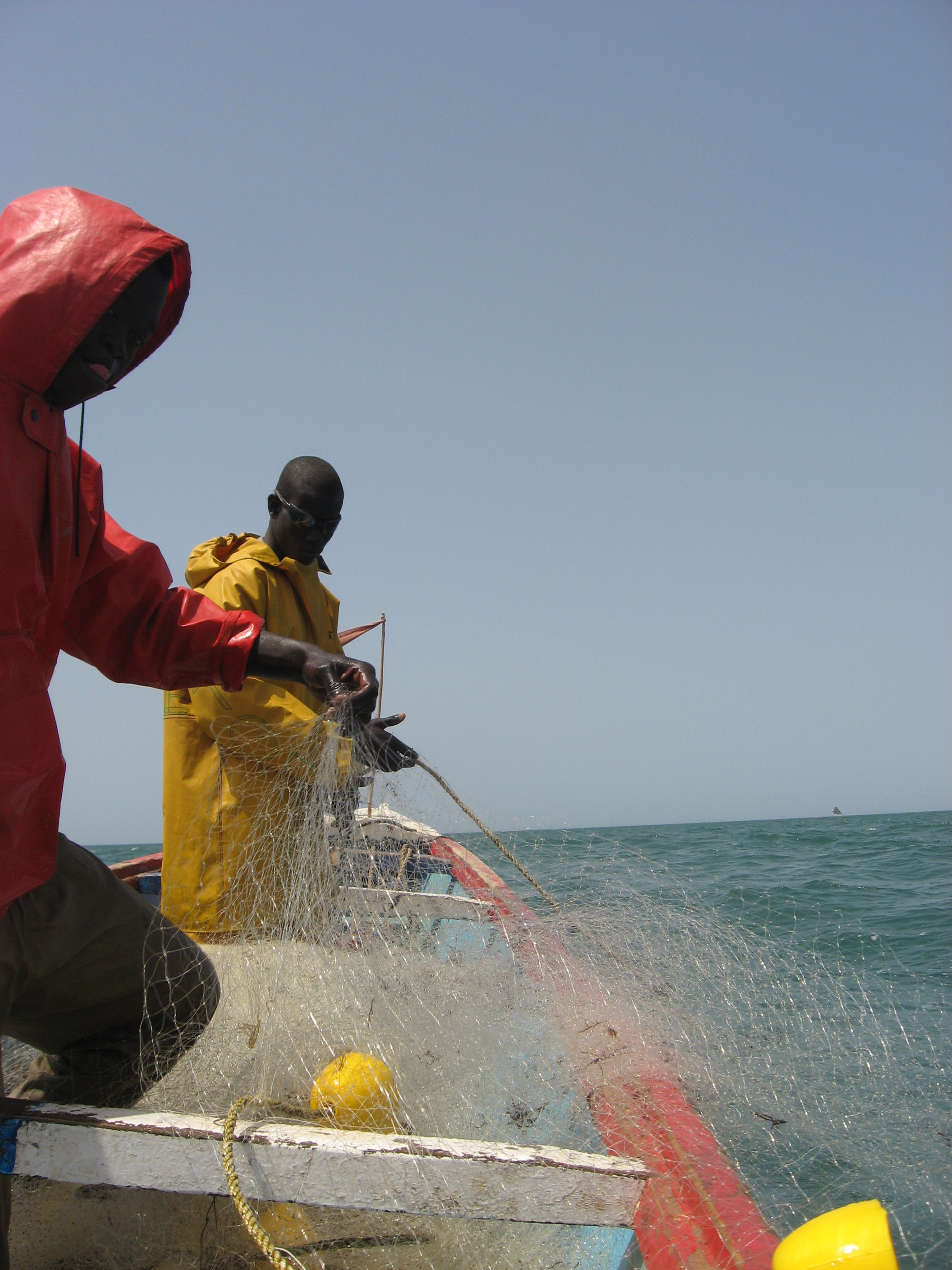

== Notable people ==
- Ayi Kwei Armah, a noted Ghanaian novelist, lives in Popenguine. He is the founder of Ankh Publishing in Popenguine.

=== Personalities born in Popenguine ===
- Hyacinthe Thiandoum Cardinal-Archbishop of Dakar
- Mamadou Diouf, former deputy and former civil administrator
- Mamadou Mansour Thiandoum, Mayor of Popenguine

== See also ==
- Religion in Senegal
