= Antão Gonçalves =

Portuguese explorer

Antão Gonçalves was a 15th-century Portuguese explorer and slave-raider who was the first European to capture Africans in the Rio do Ouro region.

== Biography ==
In 1441, Gonçalves was sent by Henry the Navigator to explore the West African coast in an expedition under the command of Nuno Tristão. As Gonçalves was considerably younger than Tristão, his duty was less exploration than it was hunting the Mediterranean monk seals that inhabit West Africa. After he had filled his small vessel with seal skins, Gonçalves, on his own initiative, decided to capture some Africans to return to Portugal. With nine of his crewmen, Gonçalves captured a tribesmen and a black women who was working as a servant for the group. An alternate record shows that Gonçalves had captured a chief and two of his subjects who were fishing in an area claimed by Portugal. The chief then offered more slaves for his freedom. Gonçalves accepted the offer.

By this time, Tristão had arrived at the same place, and the two crews joined together for another capturing trip, on which they captured 10 tribesmen, one of them a nobleman named Adahu. According to the Chronicle of Zurara, these people spoke "Sahara Azenegue". An Arab which had come with Tristão expedition was sent inland to tell the local populations about ransom negotiations for the captives, as well eventual business they would like to do. About 150 men on foot, as well as 35 on horses and camels went to the coast to meet the expedition. All but three went on hide, attempting to ambush the Portuguese. The trick was perceived, and the expedition quickly went back to the ships. The native people then showed up in the beach, displaying the Arab which had come with the Portuguese, now enslaved by them. After this, Tristão continued exploration southwards while Gonçalves returned to Portugal.

He embarked on another expedition in 1442, taking the nobleman he had captured the year before. Gonçalves hoped to barter the chief for a number of black slaves. He received 10 slaves, some gold dust, and a large number of ostrich eggs. However, this expedition contributed nothing to the cause of exploration; Gonçalves had not even sailed past the Rio do Ouro.

He was granted a new coat of arms for his name.

Not to be mistaken with another Antão Gonçalves, who coasted the Island of Madagascar at the beginnings of the 16th century.

== See also ==
- Portugal in the period of discoveries
- Portuguese Empire
