= Diombos River =

River in Senegal

Coordinates: 13°45′N 16°42′W

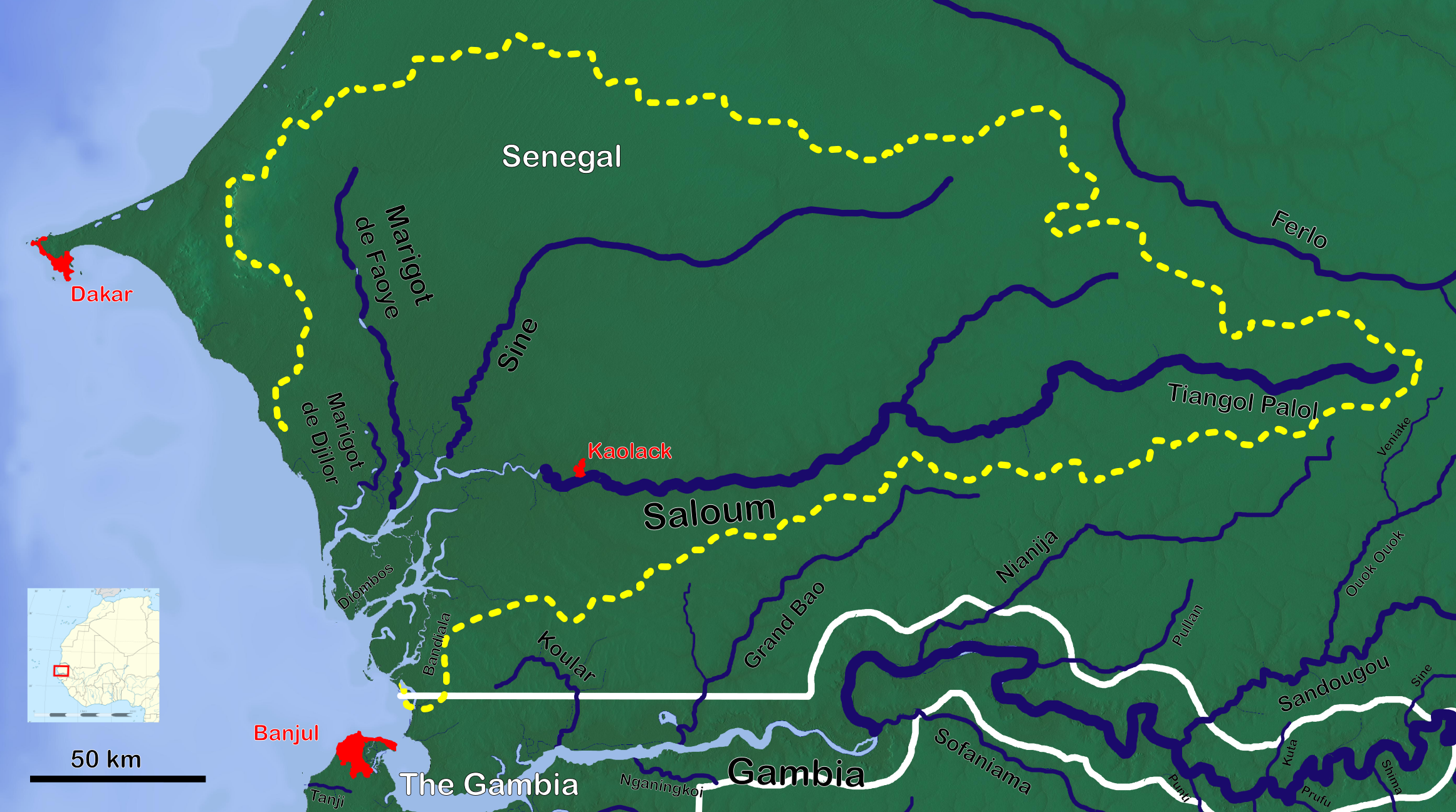

The Diombos is a river in the West African country of Senegal. It is a left-bank, southern distributary of the Saloum River, which flows into the Atlantic Ocean.

== Geography ==
The Diombos branches off from the main river between the towns of Kaolack and Foundiougne, near the villages of Gagué Bokar and Guagué Modi, and flows south. Approximately 56 kilometers further southwest, it empties into the open sea south of Île de Guior and Sangomar Island at the Banc Rouge shoal.
Considering its initially meandering course, its total length is about 78 kilometers. As the Diombos River branches off from the main channel with a width of approximately 110 meters, it narrows to about 60 meters before the dam-bridge combination for the N9 national highway (the actual passage under the road is only 10 meters wide). Further downstream, under the influence of the tidal currents, it forms a funnel-shaped estuary and is 600 to 2000 meters wide for long stretches; the estuary bay on the coast widens to 8,000 meters.

Between Saloum and Diombos, a number of mangrove-fringed islands can be found, namely the Îles du Gandoul archipelago and the large main island, known by various names such as Île du Loog, Île de Foundiougne, or Île de Soum, which is the prefecture of the department of Foundiougne.
