= Television in Cape Verde =

Television was introduced to Cape Verde in 1984, although television experiments have been conducted before that point. For over twenty years, there was only one national television channel, Televisão de Cabo Verde, first known as TEVEC, later TNCV and RTC. Excluding relays of RTP África and TV5MONDE Afrique, the television monopoly was broken in 2007 with the opening of Record Cabo Verde, followed by Televisão Independente de Cabo Verde (TIVER).

Analog transmissions ceased in 2021. The country is served by a digital terrestrial platform owned by Cabo Verde Broadcast that delivers ten channels, including four foreign channels, two of them French (TV5MONDE and France 24) and another two Portuguese (RTP África and RTP Notícias). Alou and Unitel T+ operate subscription television services.

== History ==
Long before the first regular television broadcasts started in Cape Verde, the first attempts at bringing television came at the mercy of Chibeto Faria, a bank manager, who lived in the island of São Vicente. Since Cape Verde had no television station at the time, the closest television stations were from the Canary Islands (RTVE Canarias, broadcasts started in 1964) and Senegal (ORTS, broadcasts started in 1965, regularized in 1972). To receive these signals, Chibeto had to transport his television set by donkey to Monte Verde (approximately 5 kilometers). The television viewers at the time preferred feature films and football matches.

With a growing number of viewers and followers of Chibeto, he decided to look for assistance from technicians to study the feasibility of a television service covering Mindelo with assistance from a French technician. With no money to start work, he started a fundraising campaign to set up the service. This also included the installation of a television transmitter at Monte Verde. Few households had a television set.

Shortly afterwards, in 1975, Hilário Brito, executive director of Cabo Verde Telecom, decided to implement a plan for the introduction of a television service in Praia, the national capital, with the aim of improving the newly independent country's communication infrastructure. The television transmitter at Monte Tchota was his first experience in telecommunications. In his first attempts, he received television signals from the Canary Islands. Like what happened before in Mindelo, the experiences in Monte Tchota had triggered the same effect: potential viewers went there on purpose to watch television. Locals later bought their television sets, with Hilário beginning a process to distribute the signals between Mount Tchota and Praia. Viewers were enticed by the programs coming out of the TVE station in the Canary Islands, but the schedule wasn't fixed, depending on the condition of the reception. Hilário's television station, dubbed "TV Hilário", started producing some content of its own, mixed with pirated content. His television station had no license and the international content was in violation of international property rights.

Some years before the launch of a national television service, poet Corsino Fortes, then Deputy Secretary to the Prime Minister and titular Minister of Social Communications, inspired by the television model of Iceland in which television stations existed and operated in small cities and proved the experimental mode for the country's model. The model worked even in its early years, below and above. In some shows, the signals abruptively interrupted. The station was known for its frequent transmission breakdowns

In the early 80s, RTP signed a protocol with the Cape Verdean government to supply equipment and trained staff for TEVEC, with its launch scheduled for 1983. Corsino Flores set up the project for the television service, beginning investments in equipment and obtaining staff. Studies were being made for the installation of television transmitters in three islands, Sal, São Vicente and Santiago. The national television corporation was given the name Televisão Experimental de Cabo Verde or TEVEC, it started on 12 March 1984, nine years after independence and started operating its regular service on 31 December 1984. It had 22 professionals and broadcast three days a week for several hours.

Over the years, TEVEC grew and increased its frequencies and transmissions. In its early years, the station broadcast four hours a day, from 8pm to midnight, using the SECAM-DK system. TEVEC later dropped its experimental status in 1990, becoming TNCV (Televisão Nacional de Cabo Verde), later RTC when the current Rádiotelevisão Caboverdiana was created in March 1997.

In 2004, a local television station, Televisão do Povo (TVP), opened, using a satellite dish to relay foreign programs and with coverage limited to São Vicente. Owned by Carlos Pulu, it was created to fill in an information cap with island-specific information, and had plans to expand its coverage area to Santo Antão and São Nicolau in late 2008, but quickly closed down. It faced competition from Canal d'Zau, using satellite dishes borrowed by the Municipality of São Vicente.

The television monopoly was broken in the mid-2000s. The preliminary results were revealed in January 2007, for four licenses: Record Cabo Verde with 70%, TIVER with 57%, RTI with 54% and the regional channel Nôs TV with 50%. These four companies were all above the 50% benchmark for achieving operational status. Two companies were left behind as their percentage was lower: Lakakan with 49% and Media Press with 45%. These stations would start broadcasting in a six-month window and were given 15-year licenses.

On 31 March 2007, Record Cabo Verde began operating, TIVER soon followed. RTI was expected to be in operation, but it was later found that its license was rejected.

Grupo Cidade launched its own channel, TV Cidade, on 1 July 2022, on the national DTT network.

== Terrestrial television ==
From 1984 to 2021, Cape Verde operated an analog service using the PAL standard, though early reports say that it used SECAM-DK. The analog service had "shadow areas" with little to no television and radio reception. By 2014, work for the digital terrestrial platform was underway, due to start by June 2015. The launch plan for DTT involved 60 transmitters, using the 39 existing analog ones and 21 new ones built for the purpose.

The launch of the DTT network was subsequently delayed in late 2015 to January or February 2016. Broadcasts finally started in late June 2016, with decoders costing two Cape Verdean contos. It was expected that the first phase of the analog switch-off would start in September 2017. The first phase ended in July 2017, covering 75% of the population on four islands (Santiago, Maio, Sal e São Vicente), surpassing initial expectations. On July 13, 2018, the international feed of RTP3 launched on the platform.

The analog switch-off ended in May 2021; by then, Cape Verde had a digital terrestrial penetration rate of 98%, the highest in West Africa.

== Subscription television ==
Cabo Verde Telecom through its subsidiary CV Multimédia became the first company to offer a pay-TV service, Zap TV Cabo, in 2006, using IPTV/ADSL technology, offering 21 channels at launch. CVXTV, owned by Xiamen Xinnuoli, followed in 2007. The company was later renamed Boom TV. It was later suggested that the company should cease operations and its spectrum used for the terrestrial network, including the clearing of its spectrum for possible HD channels. The company shut down in 2023. Unitel T+ launched its pay-TV service in 2021.

== Channels ==
The list only refers to the channels available at a national and regional scale on terrestrial television and excludes channels such as TCV Internacional or music channels on subscription TV.

Name	Owner	Type	Launched
Televisão de Cabo Verde	Radiotelevisão Caboverdiana	Public-owned	1984
Record Cabo Verde	Record Europa	Private	2007
TIVER	Sociedade de Comunicação para o Desenvolvimento – SCD, SA	Private	2007
RTP África	Rádio e Televisão de Portugal	Public-owned	1998
TV5MONDE Afrique	Several	Public-owned	2003 (Note: Launch year in Cape Verde. Replaced CFI TV.)
RTP Notícias	Rádio e Televisão de Portugal	Public-owned	2018 (Note: Launch year in Cape Verde)
France 24	France Médias Monde	Public-owned	2016 (Note: Launch year in Cape Verde)
Televisão África	Televisão África	Private	2021
TV Cidade	Rádio Cidade	Private	2022
TV Educativa	Ministry of Education	Public-owned	2021
TCSM	Televisão Cidade de Santa Maria	Private	
Sal One	Rádio e Televisão Sal One	Private	2022
