= Mass media in Cape Verde =

Mass media in Cape Verde includes aspects of telecommunications, television and radio.

== Telecommunications ==
In 2011, there were approximately 73,000 main line telephones and 500,000 mobile and cellular phones in use in Cape Verde, corresponding to an average of 1.1 phones per person.

== Television and radio ==
There are three television stations in Cape Verde: one state owned (RTC - TCV) and three foreign owned. RTI Cabo Verde was launched by the Portuguese-based RTI in 2005. On March 31, 2007, Cape Verde established its own version of Record, launched by the Brazilian-based Record (f.k.a. Rede Record). Later that year, a Capeverdean branch of TIVER was launched. Cape Verde has now received TV CPLP, which has been broadcasting programs since 2016. Premium channels include the Capeverdean versions of Boom TV and Zap Cabo Verde, two channels owned by Brazil's Record. Other premium channels are aired in Cape Verde via satellite. One of them is RDP África, the African version of the Portuguese radio station RDP. Satellite channels are common in hotels and villas, but availability is generally limited in the country.

The media is operated by the Capeverdean News Agency (secondarily as Inforpress).

Nationwide radio stations include RCV, RCV+, Radio Kriola, and the religious station Radio Nova. Local radio stations include Rádio Praia, the first radio station in Cape Verde; Praia FM, the first FM station in the nation; Rádio Voz de Ponta d'Água of North Praia; and Radio Morabeza in Mindelo.

Former radio stations include Rádio Clube do Mindelo, which later became Rádio Barlavento. It existed until 1975, before being replaced by Rádio Voz de São Vicente and becoming part of RCV.

== Internet ==
Internet providers and search providers in Cape Verde include SAPO CV, and more recently, Google.

== Print ==
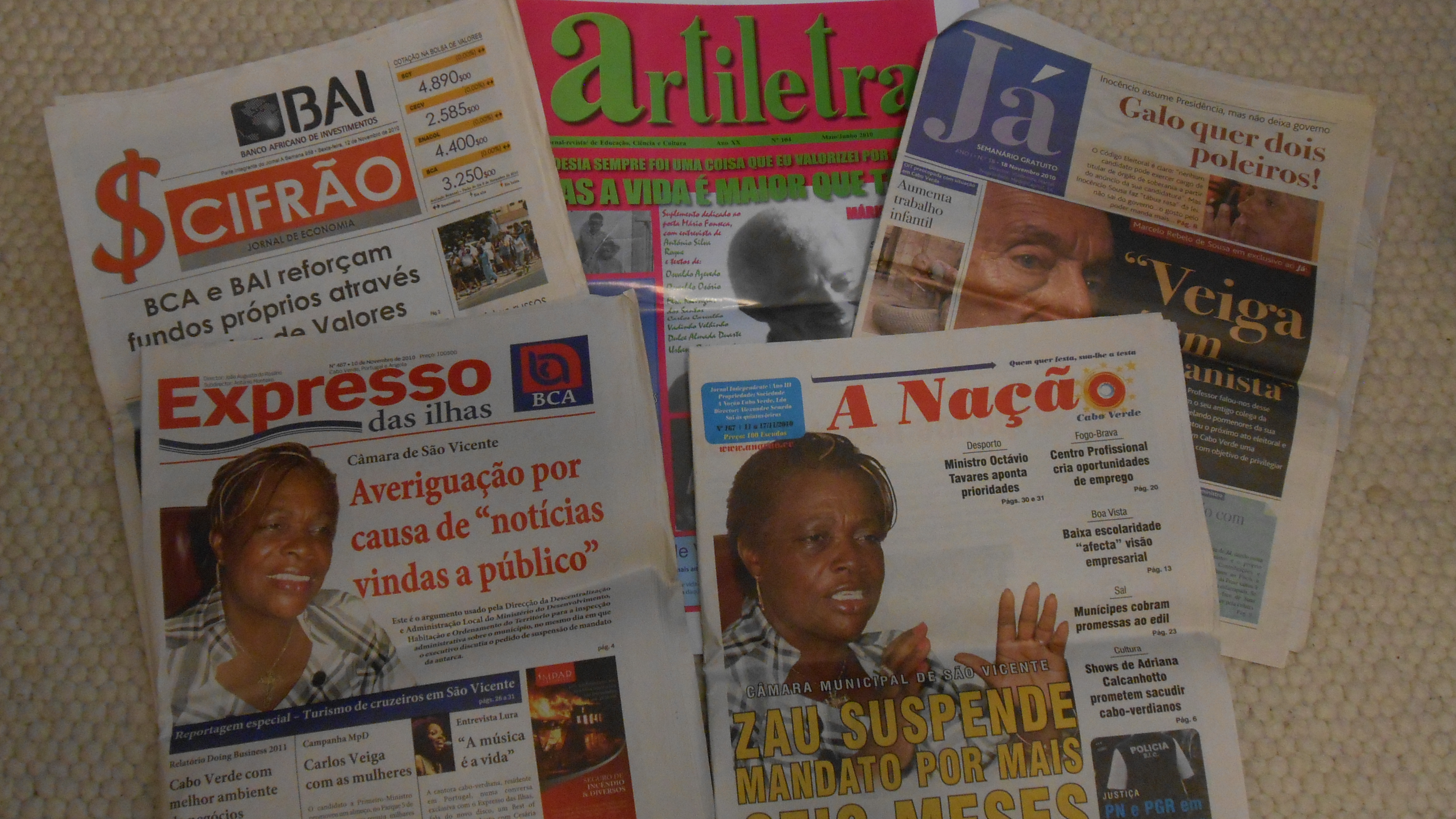
Newspapers of Cape Verde including Expresso das Ilhas, A Nação and Já

Horizonte is a daily newspaper. The government-run Novo Jornal-Cabo Verde is published twice weekly. Weekly periodicals include A Semana, Expresso das Ilhas, Jornal Horizonte, Terra Nova, Boletim Informativo, A Nação (founded in 2007) and A Voz (founded in 2013). Today, many of these national level newspaper sites are also available online, some with subscription. Regional newspapers includes Jornal O Cidadão (São Vicente), Artiletra (São Vicente), a bi-monthly newspaper/periodical, Jornal de São Nicolau and Oceanpress (Sal). Newspapers are generally written in Portuguese, the official language. Some, such as A Semana and Jornal Horizonte, have articles written in Cape Verdean Creole. Online publications tend to be written in English. Newsstands might offer newspapers in English and French, especially at touristic areas of the islands of Sal and Boa Vista. English language papers were first written in the late-19th century, but they were uncommon. Most of them were available in Mindelo, São Vicente, which was one of the primary coaling stations in West Africa. There are also online news sources which are distributed throughout the entire country.

Sports-oriented news sources available includes Criolosport and recently Sports Mídia.

Other new sources including the airline magazine of TACV Fragata.

=== History ===
The first Capeverdean newspaper came in the form of a news journal during the colonial area. Boletim Oficial de Cabo Verde (Official Bulletin of Cape Verde) was first published on 24 August 1842, on the island of Boa Vista. A few decades later, Independente was established on 1 October 1877 in Praia, Santiago. Two more publications followed soon after, with the third being O Correio de Cabo Verde (Cape Verde Post) on 19 April 1879 and the fourth being Echo de Cabo Verde (Echo of Cape Verde, Modern Portuguese: Eco de Cabo Verde) in April 1880. The journals Revista de Cabo Verde and Liberdade both began in Mindelo in 1889.

Around that same time, the journals O Povo Praiense (est. July 1886), O Praiense (est. 1889), and Praia (est. 1889) were established in Praia.

Some more recent news sources, Notícias de Cabo Verde (News from Cape Verde) and Jornal de Cabo Verde (Cape Verde Journal), started publishing in 1931. A newer paper is O Eco de Cabo Verde (Echo of Cape Verde).

== Freedom of speech ==
The Constitution of Cape Verde permits freedom of expression, and the government is said to uphold this right generally. Government authorization is not needed to establish newspapers, other printed publications, or electronic media.

== Online newspapers abroad ==
VozDiPovo-Online is an online newspaper founded in 2004 that is based in Aveiro, Portugal and serves the Capeverdean community there.

== See also ==
- Telecommunications in Cape Verde
- Cinema of Cape Verde
- Literature of Cape Verde

== Bibliography ==
- "Cape Verde: Directory". Africa South of the Sahara 2004. Regional Surveys of the World. Europa Publications. 2004. p. 195. ISBN 1857431839. (Includes information about newspapers, radio, etc.)
- "Cape Verde", Freedom of the Press, USA: Freedom House, 2015, OCLC 57509361, archived from the original on 2017-06-22
- Fernando Cristóvão (Hrsg.): Dicionário Temático da Lusofonia. Texto Editores, Lissabon/Luanda/Praia/Maputo 2006 ISBN 972-47-2935-4, p. 541
- João Nobre de Oliveira: A Imprensa Cabo-Verdiana 1820–1975, Fundação Macau, Macau 1998 ISBN 978-972-65-8017-1
