= List of companies of Cape Verde =

Location of Cape Verde

Cape Verde, officially the Republic of Cabo Verde, is an island country spanning an archipelago of 10 volcanic islands in the central Atlantic Ocean. Located 570 kilometres (350 mi) off the coast of West Africa, the islands cover a combined area of slightly over 4,000 square kilometres (1,500 sq mi).

Most of the nation's GDP comes from the service industry. Cape Verde's economy has been steadily growing since the late 1990s, and it is now officially considered a country of average development, being only the second country to have achieved such transition, after Botswana in 1994. Cape Verde has significant cooperation with Portugal at every level of the economy, which has led it to link its currency (the Cape Verdean escudo) first to the Portuguese escudo and, in 1999, to the euro.

== Notable firms ==
This list includes notable companies with primary headquarters located in the country. The industry and sector follow the Industry Classification Benchmark taxonomy. Organizations which have ceased operations are included and noted as defunct.

S.A. (Sociedade Anónima) roughly corresponds to Ltd.. Most of these companies trade at the Bolsa de Valores de Cabo Verde (BVC).

Notable companies Status: P=Private, S=State; A=Active, D=Defunct
Name	Industry	Sector	Headquarters	Founded	Notes	Status	
A Semana	Consumer services	Publishing	Praia	1991	Newspaper	P	A
Artiletra	Consumer services	Publishing	Mindelo	1991	Newspaper for the island of São Vicente	P	A
Banco Caboverdiano de Negócios	Financials	Banks	Praia	2003	Banking services	P	A
Banco Comercial do Atlântico	Financials	Banks	Praia	1993	Commercial bank	P	A
Banco Interatlântico	Financials	Banks	Praia	1999	Banking services	P	A
Bank of Cape Verde	Financials	Banks	Praia	1975	Central bank	S	A
Binter CV	Consumer services	Airlines	Praia	2014	Private charter airline	P	A
Cabo Verde Express	Consumer services	Airlines	Espargos	1998	Private charter airline	P	A
Cabo Verde Investimentos	Financials	Investment services	Praia	2004	Investments	P	A
Caixa Económica de Cabo Verde	Financials	Banks	Praia	1928	Banking services	P	A
CERIS	Consumer goods	Brewers	Praia	1988	Strela beer, Coca-Cola and others	P	A
Correios de Cabo Verde	Industrials	Delivery services	Praia	1849	Postal services	P	A
Electra	Utilities	Conventional electricity	Mindelo	1982	Electric utility	P	A
ENAPOR	Industrials	Transportation services	Mindelo	1982	Public port authority	P	A
Expresso das Ilhas	Consumer services	Publishing	Praia	1991	Newspaper	P	A
Halcyonair	Consumer services	Airlines	Espargos	2005	Airline, defunct 2013	P	D
IMPAR	Financials	Full line insurance	Praia	1992	Insurance products	P	A
Jornal Horizonte	Consumer services	Publishing	Praia	1988	Newspaper	P	A
Jornal O Cidadão	Consumer services	Publishing	Mindelo	1988	Newspaper for the island of São Vicente	P	A
Oceanpress	Consumer services	Publishing	Santa Maria	2014	Newspaper for the island of Sal	P	A
Rádio Barlavento	Consumer services	Broadcasting & entertainment	Mindelo	1955	Radio, defunct 1974	P	D
Rádio Clube do Mindelo	Consumer services	Broadcasting & entertainment	Mindelo	1947	Radio, defunct 1955	P	D
Record Cabo Verde	Consumer services	Broadcasting & entertainment	Praia	2008	Television	P	A
RTC	Consumer services	Broadcasting & entertainment	Praia	1997	Television and radio	P	A
TACV Cabo Verde Airlines	Consumer services	Airlines	Praia	1958	Charter airline	P	A
Terra Nova	Consumer services	Publishing	Mindelo	1975	Newspaper for the island of São Vicente	P	A

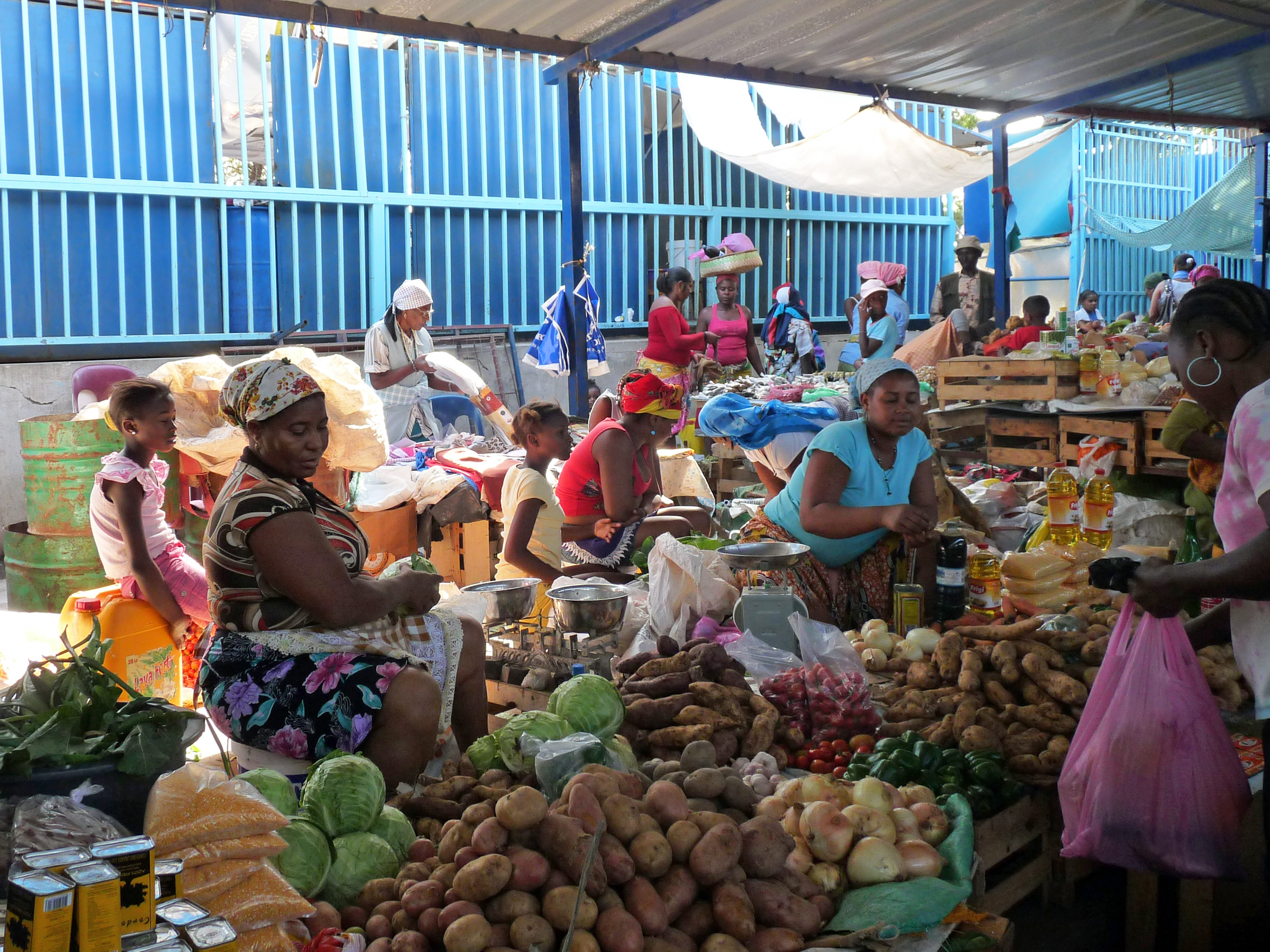
A market in the capital Praia.

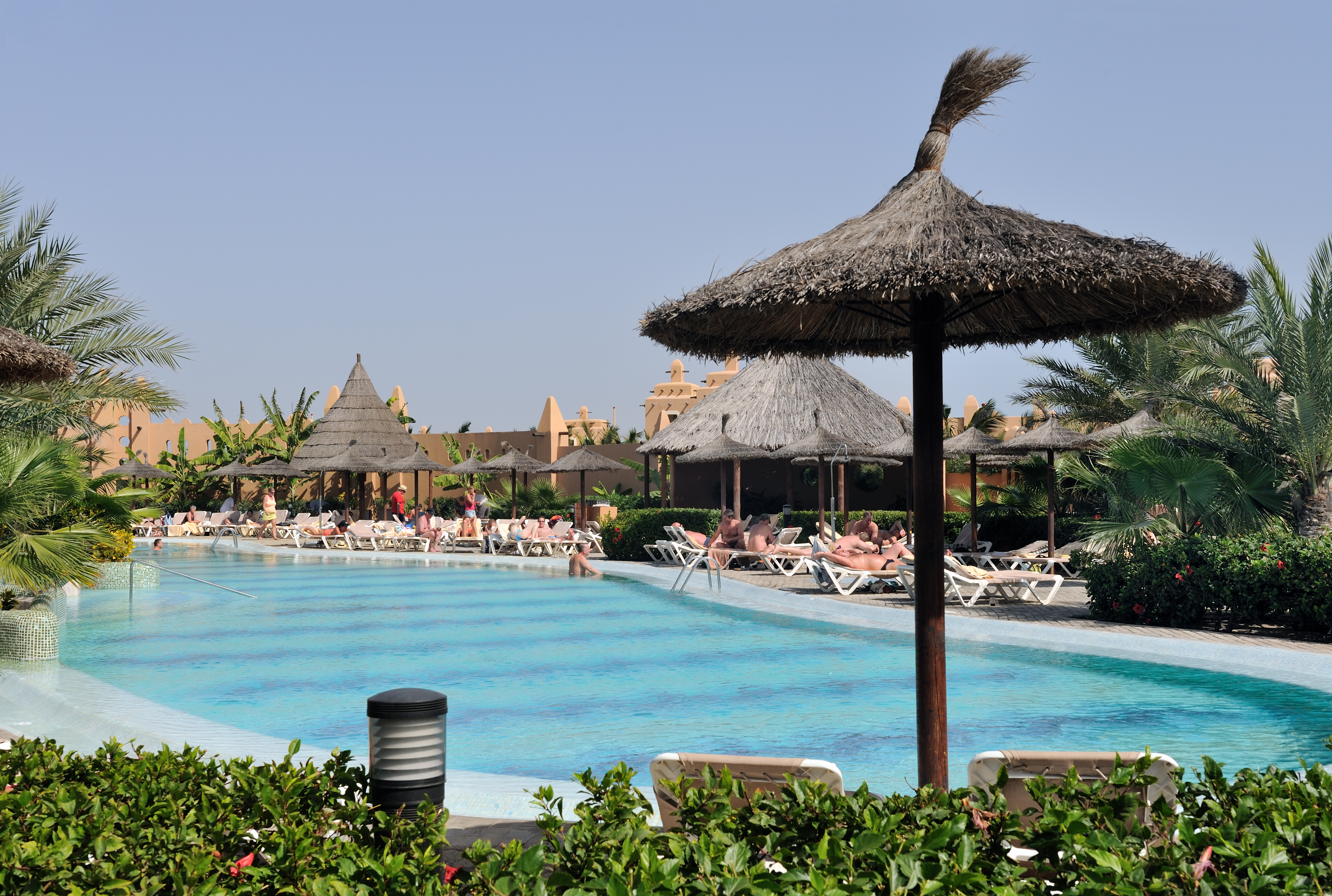
A resort in Sal.

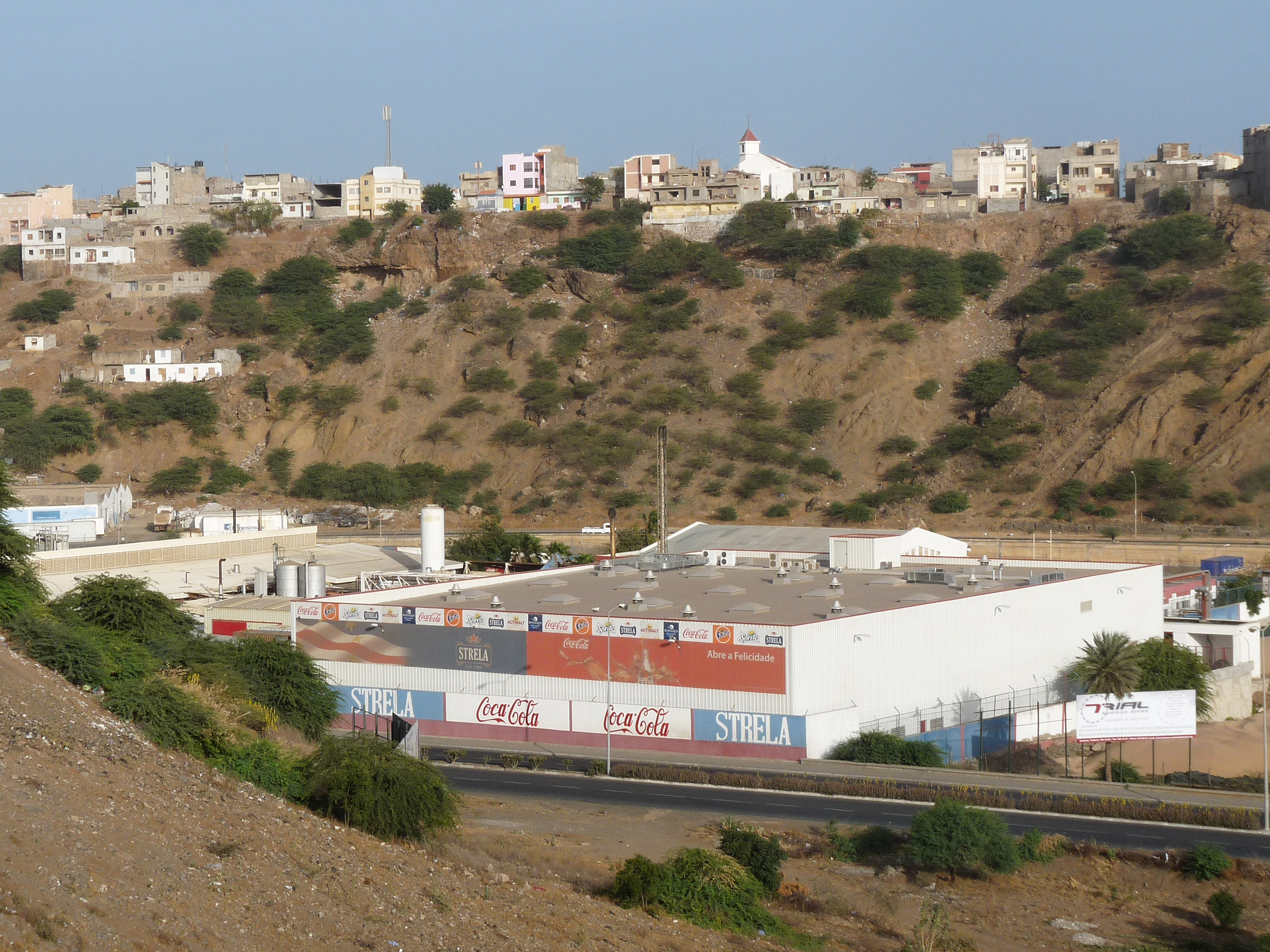
Brewery for Strela.

== See also ==
- List of banks in Cape Verde
