= 1995 in Cape Verde =

- Decades: 1970s; 1980s; 1990s; 2000s; 2010s
- See also: Other events of 1995; Timeline of Cabo Verdean history

The following lists events that happened during 1995 in Cape Verde.

== Incumbents ==
- President: António Mascarenhas Monteiro
- Prime Minister: Carlos Veiga

== Events ==
- February 16: Correios de Cabo Verde established after the dissolution of Empresa Pública dos Correios e Telecomunicaçöes
- April 5 - May 26: Eruption of the volcano Pico do Fogo,

== Arts and entertainment ==
- First edition of annual theatre festival Mindelact
- July 18: Cesária Évora's album Cesária released

== Sports ==
- Boavista Praia won the Cape Verdean Football Championship

== Births ==
- January 1: Rony Cruz, footballer
- January 15: Félix Mathaus, footballer
- January 27: Thierry Graça, footballer
- January 13: Carlos Ponck, footballer
- May 11: Gelson Martins, footballer
- December 16: Flávio dos Santos Dias, footballer
