= 1996 in Cape Verde =

- Decades: 1970s; 1980s; 1990s; 2000s; 2010s
- See also: Other events of 1996; Timeline of Cabo Verdean history

The following lists events that happened during 1996 in Cape Verde.

== Incumbents ==
- President:
  - Pedro Pires
  - António Mascarenhas Monteiro
- Prime Minister:
  - Carlos Veiga

== Events ==
- Municipality of São Miguel established from part of the municipality of Tarrafal on the island of Santiago
- Banco Caboverdiano de Negocios established in Praia
- February 18: Cape Verdean presidential election took place
- October 21: CFN became ISECMAR, now part of the University of Cape Verde

== Sports ==
- CD Travadores won the Cape Verdean Football Championship

== Births ==
- 2 January: Platiny Alves, footballer
- 5 January: Ailton César Duarte Silva, footballer
- 10 January: Vagner Gonçalves, footballer
- 8 June: Kévin Oliveira, footballer
