= RTI =

RTI or Rti may refer to:

== Broadcasters ==
- Radiodiffusion Television Ivoirienne, state broadcaster of Ivory Coast
- Radio Taiwan International, an international radio station in Taiwan
- Reti Televisive Italiane, a subsidiary of Italian media company Mediaset
- Rádio e Televisão Independente, a proposed Portuguese television channel
- Radio Televisión Ichilo, a television station in Bolivia

== Other businesses ==
- RTI International, formerly Research Triangle Institute, a not-for-profit American research organization
- RTI International Metals, an American company producing titanium
- RTI Producciones, a Colombian television production company

== In science and technology ==
=== In computing and telecommunications ===
- Run-time infrastructure (simulation)

=== In medicine ===
- Reproductive tract infection
- Respiratory tract infection
- Reverse-transcriptase inhibitor, a class of antiretroviral drug

=== Other uses in science and technology ===
- Ramp travel index, a measure of an off road vehicle articulation, ability to keep all wheels in contact with the ground over uneven terrain
- Rayleigh–Taylor instability, an instability of an interface between two fluids of different densities which occurs when the lighter fluid is pushing the heavier fluid
- referred-to-input
- Reflectance Transformation Imaging, a computational photographic method that can reveal hidden details about cultural or forensic artifacts
- Receiver Transmitter line card, in the MIDS radio communication standard
- Response Time Index, a measure of the thermal responsiveness of fire sprinklers
- Relative temperature index, UL plastic thermal-aging criteria

== Other uses ==
- Real Time Information, the method of reporting payroll in the UK
- Response to intervention, in education
- Right to Information Act, 2005, India
- Rti (Lučani), a village in Serbia
- Resistance to interrogation, a technique taught to soldiers
