= Unitel =

Unitel may refer to:

== Media and entertainment ==
- Unitel GmbH & Co.KG, German producers and distributor of filmed classical music performances
- Unitel Pictures, Philippine film production company
- Unitel Bolivia, a Bolivian television network

== Telecommunication companies ==
- Unitel (Angola), an Angolan mobile phone network
- Unitel Communications Incorporated, a Canadian telecommunications company later known as AT&T Canada
- Unitel (Mongolia), a Mongolian mobile phone network
- Unitel (Laos) or Star Telecom Co., Ltd, the Lao subsidiary of Viettel Group
- Unitel T+, a Cape Verdan telecommunications company
