= 1999 in Cape Verde =

- Decades: 1970s; 1980s; 1990s; 2000s; 2010s
- See also: Other events of 1999; Timeline of Cabo Verdean history

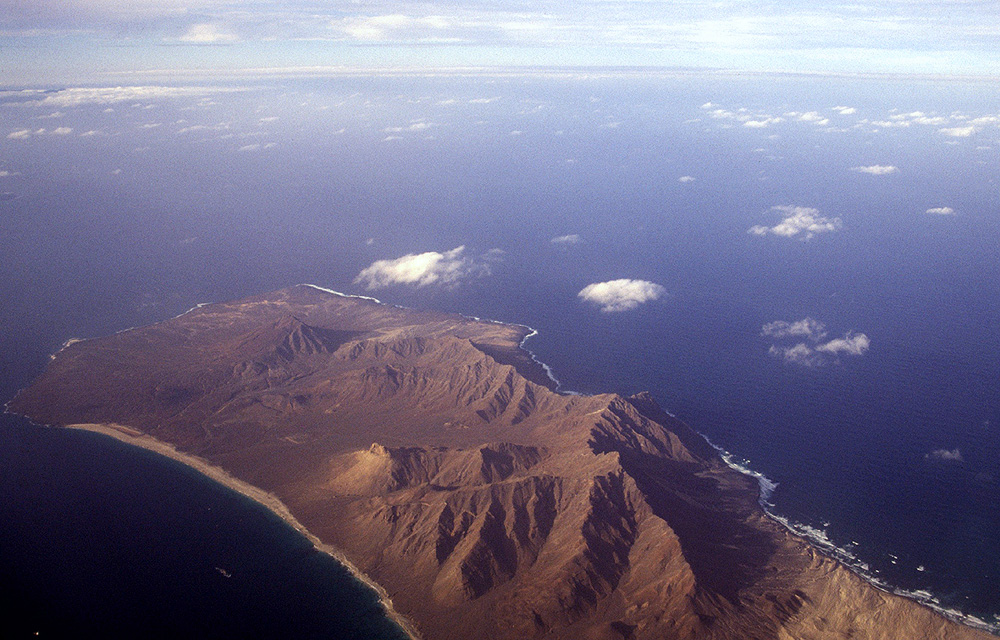
Santa Lucia island in 1999

The following lists events that happened during 1999 in Cape Verde.

== Incumbents ==
- President: António Mascarenhas Monteiro
- Prime Minister: Carlos Veiga

== Events ==
- National Library of Cape Verde first opened in Praia
- July: Banco Inter-Atlântico opened its headquarters in Praia
- 7 August: A domestic TACV Flight 5002 from São Pedro Airport to Agostinho Neto Airport crashed into a mountain on Santo Antão island, killing the 16 passengers and 2 crew members on board.

== Arts and entertainment ==
- May 25: Cesária Évora's seventh album Café Atlantico released

== Sports ==
- GD Amarantes won the Cape Verdean Football Championship
