= Cape Verde Sovereign Fund =

Cape Verdean public financial institution

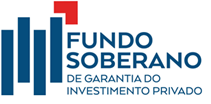
- Official logo of the Fundo Soberano de Garantia do Investimento Privado
- Native name: Fundo Soberano de Garantia do Investimento Privado, S.A. (FSGIP)
- Type: Public guarantee fund
- Industry: Public finance
- Founded: 2019
- Founder: Government of Cape Verde
- Headquarters: Praia, Cape Verde
- Area served: Cape Verde
- Key people: João Carlos Tavares Fidalgo (Chairman)
- Products: Financial guarantees and investment support
- Owner: Government of Cape Verde
- Website: www.fundosoberano.cv

Cape Verde Sovereign Fund is the common designation of the Fundo Soberano de Garantia do Investimento Privado (FSGIP), a public institution established in 2019 by the Government of Cape Verde with the objective of facilitating access to financing for private companies through the provision of guarantees in financial operations.

Headquartered in the city of Praia, the fund was initially endowed with capital of €100 million, with provision for future increases.

Unlike traditional sovereign wealth funds, the FSGIP operates primarily as a financial guarantee instrument, aiming to reduce the risks associated with business financing and facilitate access to capital markets.

== History ==
The FSGIP was established through Law No. 65/IX/2019 of 14 August as part of public policies aimed at strengthening financing mechanisms and promoting private investment in Cape Verde.

In January 2021, the institution's first Board of Directors was appointed through Administrative Order No. 5/2021.

In February 2023, the Board was restructured through Administrative Order No. 7/2023.

In April 2025, a further restructuring took place through Administrative Order No. 9/2025, resulting in the appointment of João Carlos Tavares Fidalgo as Chairman of the Board of Directors.

The fund became operational in 2023.

== Nature and operation ==
The FSGIP was conceived as an instrument to support economic financing, with a focus on providing guarantees for medium- and long-term financial operations.

Its activities focus on reducing risk for lenders and investors, allowing the mobilisation of capital for business projects across different sectors of the economy.

== Structure ==
The governance structure of the fund includes:

- Board of Directors
- Advisory Board
- Sole Auditor

The Board of Directors is responsible for the strategic and operational management of the institution.

== Chairpersons ==
Name	Term
Adalgisa Barbosa Évora Vaz	2021–2023
Pedro Mendes de Barros	2023–2025
João Carlos Tavares Fidalgo	2025–present

== Activities ==
The fund began operations in 2023, focusing on the provision of guarantees for business projects.

Among its publicly reported operations was participation in a bond issuance used to finance a hotel development project in Mindelo, on the island of São Vicente.

== See also ==
- Economy of Cape Verde
- Bank of Cape Verde
