= A Nação =

Cape Verdean newspaper

- Type: Daily
- Format: National
- President: Alexandre Semedo
- Founded: 2007
- Headquarters: Praia, Cape Verde
- Website: www.anacao.cv

A Nação (Portuguese meaning "The Nation") is a Cape Verdean weekly that covers its top stories in the archipelago and local stories ranging from each island. Its headquarters located in the Cape Verdean capital city of Praia and is the fourth oldest newspaper in the nation which published its first issue in 2007, Its current head is Alexandre Semedo.

Its daily circulation is about 5,000. Its current price is 100 escudos and now there may be online subscription.

The newspaper is written in the Portuguese language, most or much of the articles are written in, some articles are also written in Capeverdean Creole. Online, recently, some of its articles can be found in English.

== History ==
The newspaper celebrated its 5th anniversary in 2012 and its 10th anniversary in 2017.

== Contents ==
A Nação also features sports, entertainment, weather and business sections.

== See also ==
- Newspapers in Cape Verde
- List of companies in Cape Verde
