= 2018–19 Austrian Football Second League =

Austrian Football Second League
- Season: 2018–19

The 2018–19 Austrian Football Second League is the 45th season of the Austrian second-level football league and the first one as the Second League. The league has been expanded to 16 teams for this season with one team being promoted to the Austrian Bundesliga and 3 teams being relegated to the Austrian Regionalliga at the end of the season.

== Teams ==
Sixteen teams participated in the 2018–19 season. SV Horn, SKU Amstetten, FK Austria Wien II, SV Lafnitz, SK Vorwärts Steyr, FC Juniors OÖ, SK Austria Klagenfurt and FC Wacker Innsbruck II were promoted either through promotion or application to the new league structure. Relegation was not implemented in the previous season as a result of a decision made to expand the league.

FC Wacker Innsbruck II, FK Austria Wien II, FC Liefering and FC Juniors Oberösterreich are not eligible for promotion.

Location of teams in the 2018–19 Austrian Football First League

Club Name	City	Stadium	Capacity
Austria Lustenau	Lustenau	Reichshofstadion	8,800
FC Blau-Weiß Linz	Linz	Donauparkstadion	2,000
Floridsdorfer AC	Vienna	FAC-Platz	3,000
FK Austria Wien II	Vienna	Austria-Akademie	830
Kapfenberger SV	Kapfenberg	Franz-Fekete-Stadion	12,000
Liefering	Salzburg	Untersberg-Arena	4,128
SV Ried	Ried im Innkreis	Keine Sorgen Arena	7,680
Wacker Innsbruck II	Innsbruck	Tivoli W1	700
Wiener Neustadt	Wiener Neustadt	Stadion Wiener Neustadt	10,000
WSG Wattens	Wattens	Alpenstadion	5,500
FC Juniors OÖ	Pasching	Waldstadion	7,870
SV Horn	Horn	Waldviertler Volksbank Arena	7,870
SKU Amstetten	Amstetten	Ertl Glas Stadion	2,000
SV Lafnitz	Lafnitz	Sportplatz Lafnitz	3,000
SK Vorwärts Steyr	Steyr	Vorwärts-Stadion	6,000
SK Austria Klagenfurt	Klagenfurt	Wörthersee Stadion	32,000

=== Personnel and kits ===
Club	Manager	Captain	Kit Manufacturer	Sponsors
Austria Lustenau	(Austria) Gernot Plassnegger		Uhlsport	
FC Blau-Weiß Linz	(Austria) Thomas Sageder		Uhlsport	
Floridsdorfer	(Austria) Mario Handl		Puma	
FK Austria Wien II	(Austria) Andreas Ogris		Nike	
Kapfenberger	(Austria) Kurt Russ		Erima	
Liefering	(Poland) Janusz Góra & (Austria) Gerhard Struber		Nike	
SV Ried	(Austria) Thomas Weissenböck		Hummel	
Wacker Innsbruck II	(Austria) Thomas Grumser		Macron	
WSG Wattens	(Austria) Thomas Silberberger		Erima	
Wiener Neustadt	(Austria) Roman Mählich		Capelli	
FC Juniors OÖ	(Austria) Ronald Brunmayr			
SV Horn	(Germany) Carsten Jancker			
SKU Amstetten	(Austria) Robert Weinstabl		Puma	
SV Lafnitz	(Austria) Ferdinand Feldhofer		adidas	
SK Vorwärts Steyr	(Austria) Gerald Scheiblehner		Erima	
SK Austria Klagenfurt	(Austria) Franz Polanz		Erreà	

== League table ==
Pos	Team	Pld	W	D	L	GF	GA	GD	Pts	Promotion or relegation
1	WSG Wattens (C, P)	30	19	8	3	59	26	+33	65	Promotion to 2019–20 Austrian Bundesliga
2	SV Ried	30	18	9	3	61	21	+40	63	
3	Austria Lustenau	30	14	8	8	55	34	+21	50	
4	Kapfenberger SV	30	13	7	10	44	40	+4	46	
5	Blau-Weiß Linz	30	14	2	14	46	48	−2	44	
6	FC Juniors OÖ	30	13	3	14	52	55	−3	42	
7	Austria Klagenfurt	30	9	14	7	43	35	+8	41	
8	Floridsdorfer AC	30	11	8	11	35	41	−6	41	
9	SKU Amstetten	30	10	6	14	45	43	+2	36	
10	FC Liefering	30	10	5	15	50	54	−4	35	
11	Austria Wien II	30	9	7	14	46	62	−16	34	
12	SV Lafnitz	30	8	9	13	36	42	−6	33	
13	SV Horn	30	6	7	17	33	62	−29	25	
14	Vorwärts Steyr	30	5	6	19	32	68	−36	21	
15	Wiener Neustadt (R)	30	12	8	10	39	41	−2	44	Relegation to 2019–20 Austrian Regionalliga
16	Wacker Innsbruck II (R)	30	10	11	9	40	44	−4	41	Relegation to 2019–20 Austrian Regionalliga

Source: 2. Liga
Rules for classification: 1) Points; 2) Less matches awarded against; 3) Goal difference; 4) Goals scored; 5) Matches won; 6) Away matches won; 7) Head-to-head points; 8) Head-to-head goal difference; 9) Head-to-head goals scored.
(C) Champions; (P) Promoted; (R) Relegated

== Season statistics ==
=== Top goalscorers ===
Rank	Player	Club	Goals
1	(Brazil) Ronivaldo	Austria Lustenau	26
2	(Austria) David Peham	SKU Amstetten	15
2	(Austria) Marko Raguz	Juniors OÖ	15
3	(Austria) Thomas Sabitzer	Kapfenberger SV	12
3	(Austria) Benjamin Pranter	WSG Wattens	12

2018/19 Goalscorers list

== See also ==
- 2018–19 Austrian Football Bundesliga
- 2018–19 Austrian Cup
