= Inforpress =

News Agency

- Type: News agency
- Owner: Government of Cape Verde
- Founded: 1988; 37 years ago
- Country: Cape Verde
- Website: www.inforpress.publ.cv

Inforpress - Capeverdean News Agency (Portuguese: Inforpress - Agência Cabo-verdiana de Notícias) is the official news agency of Cape Verde. It is headquartered in the capital city of Praia. Its current head is Jacqueline Elisa Barreto de Carvalho which she became in October 2017.

== History ==
Inforpress was founded in 1988 as Cabopress and it changed to its current name in 1998. Inforpress is the elemental name of "Informative Press" and is sometimes known as the "Capeverdean News Agency" but is not the official name.

It is one of the founding members of Aliança das Agências de Informação de Língua Portuguesa (ALP), Alliance of Portuguese-speaking News Agencies, formed in July 1996.

The building is located in Largo de Marconi in the neighborhood of Achada Santo António.

The agency offers news service in text, videos, sounds for radio, information relating to photographies. Also, it provides services to all the organizations of social communications, national and international, inside and outside the country Its news sources are published on line with a free access, but the information package that offers customers (texts and images) are available for subscription. Its videos are used for TV that are edited or unedited. The corporation has dedicated to provide specialized services for public and private companies, state and other institutions, both national and international. Inforpress receives a generalist services about news related to politics, economics, society, sports, culture and environment.

Inforpress has its own television network called Inforpress-TV, a corporation which brings emergency services for television (Emergencia-TV), which is rarely done today.

In autumn of 2014, the Capeverdean government began to merge Inforpress with Rádio Televisão Cabo-Verdiana. In September 2015, Capeverdean president Jorge Carlos Fonseca sanctioned a bill that merged the two companies to create a new entity, Radiotelevisão & Inforpress, Sociedade Anónima (RTCI - Broadcasting, Inforpress and Anonymous Society).

In June 2015, journalist Arminda Barros of Inforpress started a consensus between governments and opposition for the first president of the new entity of media regulation in Cape Verde, the Autoridade Reguladora da Comunicação Social (ARC), the Social Communications Regulator Authority.

== See also ==
- Aliança das Agências de Informação de Língua Portuguesa (ALP), Alliance of Portuguese-speaking News Agencies
- Mass media in Cape Verde
