= List of banks in Cape Verde =

This is a list of commercial banks in Cape Verde, as updated in late 2024 by the Bank of Cape Verde.

== List of commercial banks ==
- Banco BAI Cabo Verde, S.A., part of Banco Angolano de Investimentos Group
- Banco Caboverdiano de Negócios, S.A., majority-owned by insurance group IMPAR
- Banco Comercial do Atlântico, S.A.
- Banco Interatlântico, S.A., part of CGD Group
- Banco de Fomento Internacional - BFI Bank, S.A.
- Caixa Económica de Cabo Verde, S.A., state-owned
- Ecobank Cabo Verde, S.A., part of Ecobank Group
- International Investment Bank, S.A. (formerly Banco Internacional de Cabo Verde, S.A. / Banco Espírito Santo de Cabo Verde), owned by Bahrain-based iiB Group Holdings WLL

Banks in liquidation

- Banco BIC Cabo Verde, S.A., formerly Banco Português de Negócios (IFI), S.A.
- Banco Privado Internacional, S.A.

== See also ==
- List of banks in Africa
