= Boom TV (Cape Verde) =

Defunct subscription television operator

Boom TV was a subscription television operator in Cape Verde which operated between 2007 and 2023. It was established with help of a company from Xiamen, later sold off and shut down in 2023. It broadcast entirely on digital terrestrial television.

== History ==
On 15 April 2007, Xiamen Xinnuoli announced CVXTV, represented by its Cape Verdean subsidiary Cabo Verde Xinnuoli de Serviços de Teledifusão Digital, SA. The company announced a 30 April launch and six in-house channels: CVXTV Cinema 1, CVXTV Cinema 2 (both in Portuguese and Spanish), CVXTV Education (Portuguese, French, Spanish and English), CVXTV Cartoon (Portuguese and Spanish), CVXTV Music World (Portuguese and Spanish) and CVXTV XXX (optional adult channel). The company was also negotiating with BBC World, TVE Internacional TV5MONDE and others to deliver their channels on its platform. The service was available only in Praia. In its first ten days of operation, CVXTV only got 150 subscribers. CVXTV president Li Shu Ying announced that CVXTV would soon begin broadcasting a sports channel. All subscribers had opted for the basic package, which by then had added VH1.

At an unknown date, the company changed its name to Boom Multimédia, consequently, the service name became Boom TV. Its coverage as of 2018 was still limited to the island of Santiago, where Praia is located. The company downlinked its channels from satellites, and later relayed them to its 12 transmitting stations across the island. Its multiplexes were broadcast on eight UHF frequencies unused by analog television (47, 49, 51, 53, 55, 57, 59, 61). The Cape Verdean government announced plans to use the entire spectrum for an entirely free-to-air, nationwide digital terrestrial television platform. As of 2018, the platform proper had twelve channels, five of them occupied (Televisão de Cabo Verde, RTP África, Televisão Independente de Cabo Verde, Record Cabo Verde, TV5MONDE Afrique) and seven reserved for future use. The remaining 28 slots (eight an MUX A and all twenty on MUX B) were used by Boom TV's pay-TV service. Several proposals were made to rearrange the platform, giving it a third multiplex (enabling Sistema Terra Verde to have a slot), as well as new players and regional channels. There was also the hypothesis of reducing the amount of channels by introducing pay-TV services to MUX B and the mooted MUX C, the latter of which outside of Boom TV's control.

It carried the Portuguese pornographic channel HOT, fact that caused a deliberation from regulator ARC in 2021 for airing its service free-to-air during the morning, in violation of local media laws.

On 3 August 2023, Boom TV announced that it would cease operations effective 31 August, also showing signs of dissatisfaction regarding pirating of its services, except for municipal satellite dishes.
