= 2014 Copa Colombia =

Copa Postobón 2014

Tournament details
- Country: Colombia
- Teams: 36

Final positions
- Champions: Deportes Tolima (1st title)
- Runners-up: Santa Fe
- 2015 Copa Sudamericana: Deportes Tolima

Tournament statistics
- Top goal scorer(s): Óscar Santos (10 goals)

The 2014 Copa Colombia, officially the 2014 Copa Postobón for sponsorship reasons, was the 12th edition of the Copa Colombia, the national cup competition for clubs of DIMAYOR. It began on June 29 and ended on November 12. The tournament comprised a total of 36 teams. The winner, Deportes Tolima, who defeated Santa Fe 3–2 on aggregate score in the final, earned a berth to the 2015 Copa Sudamericana.

== Group stage ==
The 36 teams were divided into six groups based on each separate region of Colombia. Each group is played in home-and-away round-robin format. The group winners and runners-up, along with the four best third-placed teams, advance to the Round of 16. The matches were played from June 29 to August 27.

=== Group A ===
Team	Pld	W	D	L	GF	GA	GD	Pts	JUN	VAL	RCA	UAU	BAR	UMA
Junior	10	6	3	1	20	6	+14	21		3–2	1–1	3–0	2–0	1–1
Valledupar	10	5	4	1	17	7	+10	19	1–0		3–0	1–1	0–0	2–0
Real Cartagena	10	3	4	3	13	12	+1	13	0–0	1–5		0–1	0–0	7–0
Uniautónoma	10	4	1	5	10	13	−3	13	0–2	1–2	0–1		3–1	1–0
Barranquilla	10	3	4	3	7	11	−4	13	1–4	0–0	1–1	2–1		1–0
Unión Magdalena	10	0	2	8	4	22	−18	2	0–4	1–1	1–2	1–2	0–1	

Legend: Blue = home team win; Yellow = draw; Red = away team win.

=== Group B ===
Team	Pld	W	D	L	GF	GA	GD	Pts	NAC	MED	ENV	JAG	AD	RIO
Atlético Nacional	10	6	3	1	20	12	+8	21		3–0	3–3	1–0	2–1	2–2
Ind. Medellín	10	6	3	1	16	9	+7	21	2–1		2–0	2–1	0–0	3–0
Envigado	10	3	4	3	12	12	0	13	0–1	1–1		0–0	0–0	4–2
Jaguares	10	2	5	3	7	9	−2	11	1–1	1–3	2–1		1–0	1–1
Águilas Doradas	10	1	5	4	12	14	−2	8	1–3	2–2	1–2	0–0		6–3
Dep. Rionegro (Note: Leones F.C. since July 28.)	10	0	4	6	11	22	−11	4	2–3	0–1	0–1	0–0	1–1	

Legend: Blue = home team win; Yellow = draw; Red = away team win.

=== Group C ===
Team	Pld	W	D	L	GF	GA	GD	Pts	BOY	PAT	CUC	ALP	BUC	RSA
Boyacá Chicó	10	5	5	0	11	4	+7	20		0–0	1–1	0–0	2–1	2–1
Patriotas	10	5	4	1	10	8	+2	19	0–0		1–1	1–0	2–1	2–0
Cúcuta Deportivo	10	4	5	1	13	6	+7	17	0–1	1–1		1–1	0–0	3–0
Alianza Petrolera	10	2	4	4	10	11	−1	10	0–1	4–0	0–2		1–1	2–2
Atl. Bucaramanga	10	2	3	5	9	13	−4	9	1–1	1–2	0–2	3–0		1–0
Real Santander	10	1	1	8	7	18	−11	4	0–3	0–1	1–2	0–2	3–0	

Legend: Blue = home team win; Yellow = draw; Red = away team win.

=== Group D ===
Team	Pld	W	D	L	GF	GA	GD	Pts	SFE	EQU	LLA	BOG	MIL	EXR
Santa Fe	10	9	0	1	21	9	+12	27		3–1	2–0	3–1	1–0	4–1
La Equidad	10	4	4	2	14	11	+3	16	1–2		2–2	1–0	1–0	3–0
Llaneros	10	4	2	4	11	11	0	14	3–1	1–1		0–1	2–1	0–1
Bogotá	10	4	2	4	10	11	−1	14	1–2	1–1	1–0		0–1	2–2
Millonarios	10	2	1	7	8	13	−5	7	0–1	2–2	1–2	1–2		1–0
Expreso Rojo	10	2	1	7	7	16	−9	7	1–2	0–1	0–1	0–1	2–1	

Legend: Blue = home team win; Yellow = draw; Red = away team win.

=== Group E ===
Team	Pld	W	D	L	GF	GA	GD	Pts	COR	AME	CAL	PAS	UPO	DEP
Cortuluá	10	4	5	1	12	8	+4	17		0–0	0–0	2–0	1–1	2–0
América	10	3	5	2	14	8	+6	14	2–2		2–2	0–1	2–1	4–0
Deportivo Cali	10	3	5	2	11	9	+2	14	0–1	0–0		0–1	1–1	2–1
Deportivo Pasto	10	4	2	4	12	11	+1	14	3–1	0–3	1–1		4–0	1–1
Univ. Popayán	10	3	3	4	10	14	−4	12	1–1	1–0	1–3	1–0		3–0 (Note: Awarded)
Depor	10	2	2	6	9	18	−9	8	1–2	1–1	1–2	2–1	2–0	

Legend: Blue = home team win; Yellow = draw; Red = away team win.

=== Group F ===
Team	Pld	W	D	L	GF	GA	GD	Pts	TOL	QUI	OCA	HUI	FOR	PER
Deportes Tolima	10	7	0	3	18	10	+8	21		4–2	3–0	2–1	1–0	3–0
Deportes Quindío	10	5	2	3	15	13	+2	17	1–2		2–1	4–2	1–0	2–1
Once Caldas	10	5	1	4	16	14	+2	16	1–0	2–1		2–1	0–0	5–2
Atlético Huila	10	4	1	5	14	14	0	13	0–2	1–1	2–0		1–0	2–1
Fortaleza	10	3	3	4	7	10	−3	12	2–1	0–0	1–4	2–1		0–0
Deportivo Pereira	10	2	1	7	10	19	−9	7	3–0 (Note: Awarded)	0–1	2–1	0–3	1–2	

Legend: Blue = home team win; Yellow = draw; Red = away team win.

=== Ranking of third-placed teams ===
Grp	Team	Pld	W	D	L	GF	GA	GD	Pts
C	Cúcuta Deportivo	10	4	5	1	13	6	+7	17
F	Once Caldas	10	5	1	4	16	14	+2	16
E	Deportivo Cali	10	3	5	2	11	9	+2	14
D	Llaneros	10	4	2	4	11	11	0	14
A	Real Cartagena	10	3	4	3	13	12	+1	13
B	Envigado	10	3	4	3	12	12	0	13

== Knockout phase ==
Each tie in the knockout phase is played in home-and-away two-legged format. In each tie, the team which has the better overall record up to that stage host the second leg, except in the round of 16 where the group winners automatically host the second leg. In case of a tie in aggregate score, neither the away goals rule nor extra time is applied, and the tie is decided by a penalty shoot-out.

=== Bracket ===
Round of 16
La Equidad	0	2	2 (3)
Patriotas	0	2	2 (4)
Once Caldas	2	1	3
Boyacá Chicó	1	0	1
Deportivo Cali	1	1	2 (2)
Atlético Nacional	2	0	2 (3)
Independiente Medellín	0	2	2
Deportes Tolima	1	4	5
Valledupar	3	1	4
Cortuluá	1	1	2
Llaneros	1	1	2 (2)
Junior	1	1	2 (4)
América	0	0	0
Deportes Quindío	1	0	1
Cúcuta Deportivo	1	0	1
Santa Fe	2	2	4

Quarterfinals
Patriotas	2	4	6
Once Caldas	2	1	3
Atlético Nacional	2	0	2
Deportes Tolima	2	2	4
Valledupar	2	2	4
Junior	3	4	7
Deportes Quindío	0	2	2
Santa Fe	2	2	4

Semifinals
Patriotas	0	1	1
Deportes Tolima	0	2	2
Junior	0	0	0
Santa Fe	0	1	1

Final
Deportes Tolima	2	1	3
Santa Fe	0	2	2

=== Round of 16 ===
First legs: September 4, 9, 10, 11; Second legs: September 17, 18, 19.

Team 1	Agg.	Team 2	1st leg	2nd leg
La Equidad	2–2 (3–4 p)	Patriotas	0–0	2–2
Once Caldas	3–1	Boyacá Chicó	2–1	1–0
Deportivo Cali	2–2 (2–3 p)	Atlético Nacional	1–2	1–0
Independiente Medellín	2–5	Deportes Tolima	0–1	2–4
Valledupar	4–2	Cortuluá	3–1	1–1
Llaneros	2–2 (2–4 p)	Junior	1–1	1–1
América	0–1	Deportes Quindío	0–1	0–0
Cúcuta Deportivo	1–4	Santa Fe	1–2	0–2

=== Quarterfinals ===
First legs: October 1, 2; Second legs: October 8.

Team 1	Agg.	Team 2	1st leg	2nd leg
Patriotas	6–3	Once Caldas	2–2	4–1
Atlético Nacional	2–4	Deportes Tolima	2–2	0–2
Valledupar	4–7	Junior	2–3	2–4
Deportes Quindío	2–4	Santa Fe	0–2	2–2

=== Semifinals ===
First legs: October 22; Second legs: October 29.

Team 1	Agg.	Team 2	1st leg	2nd leg
Patriotas	1–2	Deportes Tolima	0–0	1–2
Junior	0–1	Santa Fe	0–0	0–1

=== Final ===
First leg: November 5; Second leg: November 12.

Team 1	Agg.	Team 2	1st leg	2nd leg
Deportes Tolima	3–2	Santa Fe	2–0	1–2

== Top goalscorers ==
Rank	Name	Club	Goals
1	(Colombia) Óscar Santos	Valledupar	10
2	(Colombia) Michael Rangel	Santa Fe	9
3	(Colombia) Yessy Mena	Junior	8
4	(Colombia) Jefferson Cuero	Santa Fe	7
4	(Paraguay) Leonardo Villagra	La Equidad	7
4	(Colombia) Wilfrido de La Rosa	Deportes Tolima	7

Source: Copa Postobón
