= Banco Comercial do Atlântico =

- Company type: Commercial banking
- Founded: September 1, 1993
- Headquarters: Praia, Santiago, Cape Verde
- Products: Commercial banking
- Website: www.bca.cv

The Banco Comercial do Atlântico (Portuguese meaning the "Atlantic Commercial Bank", abbreviation: BCA) is a Cape Verdean commercial bank. The headquarters of the company are located at Praça Alexandre Albuquerque, in Praia, the capital of Cape Verde. The bank has 34 branches spread over all 9 inhabited Cape Verdean islands.

== History ==
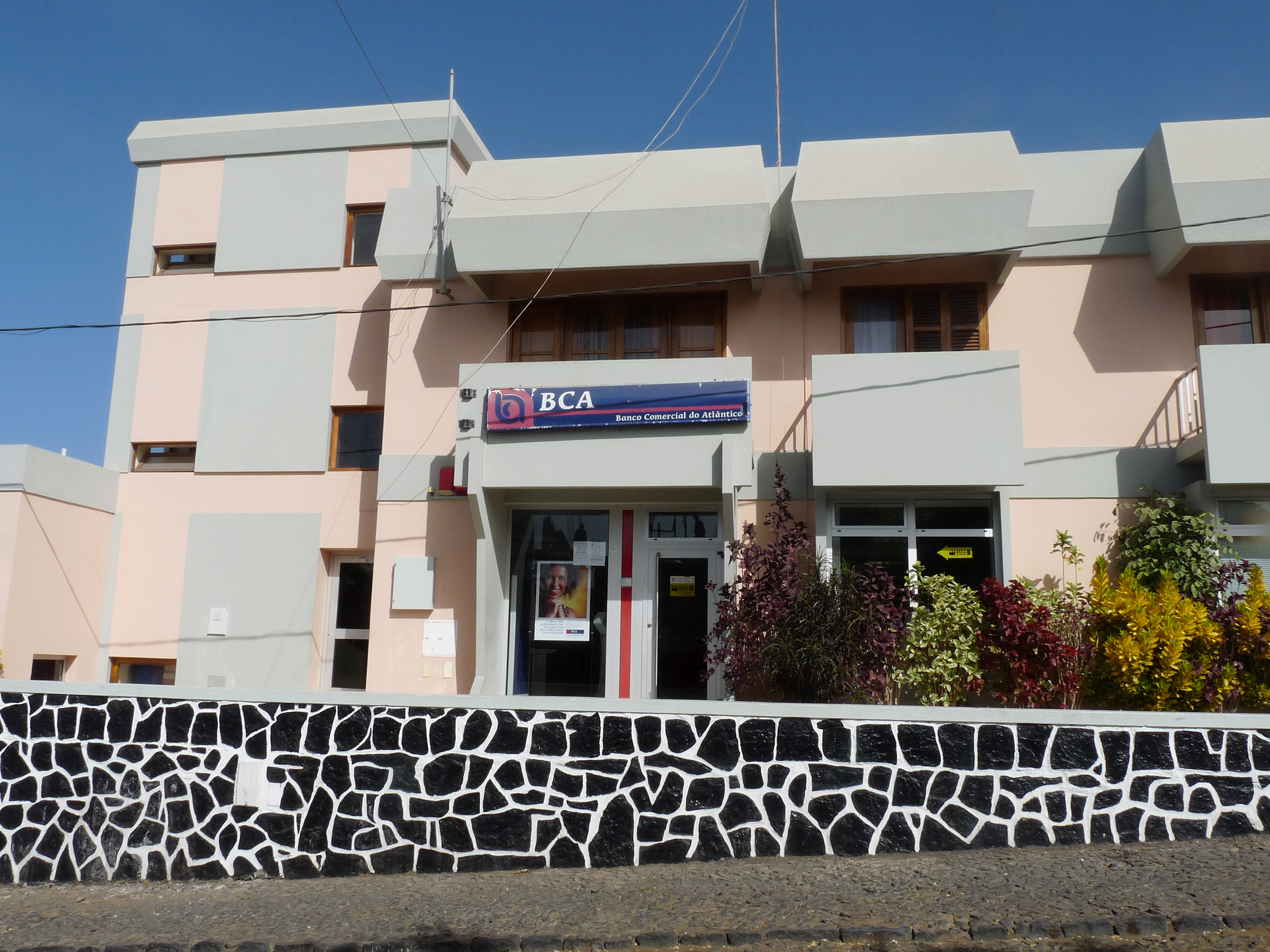
A BCA branch in São Filipe on the island of Fogo

The bank was created on September 1, 1993, when the government split off the commercial banking functions from the Bank of Cape Verde into the newly established Banco Comercial do Atlântico. Privatization of BCA was authorised in 1998, and the group formed by Caixa Geral de Depósitos and Banco Interatlântico was selected as a strategic partner in February 2000. In 2019 CGD/BI sold 52.65% of the shares of BCA. The National Institute of Social Security owns 10%.

== See also ==
- List of companies in Cape Verde
- List of banks in Cape Verde
