= João Carlos Tavares Fidalgo =

Cape Verdean economist and financial manager

João Fidalgo
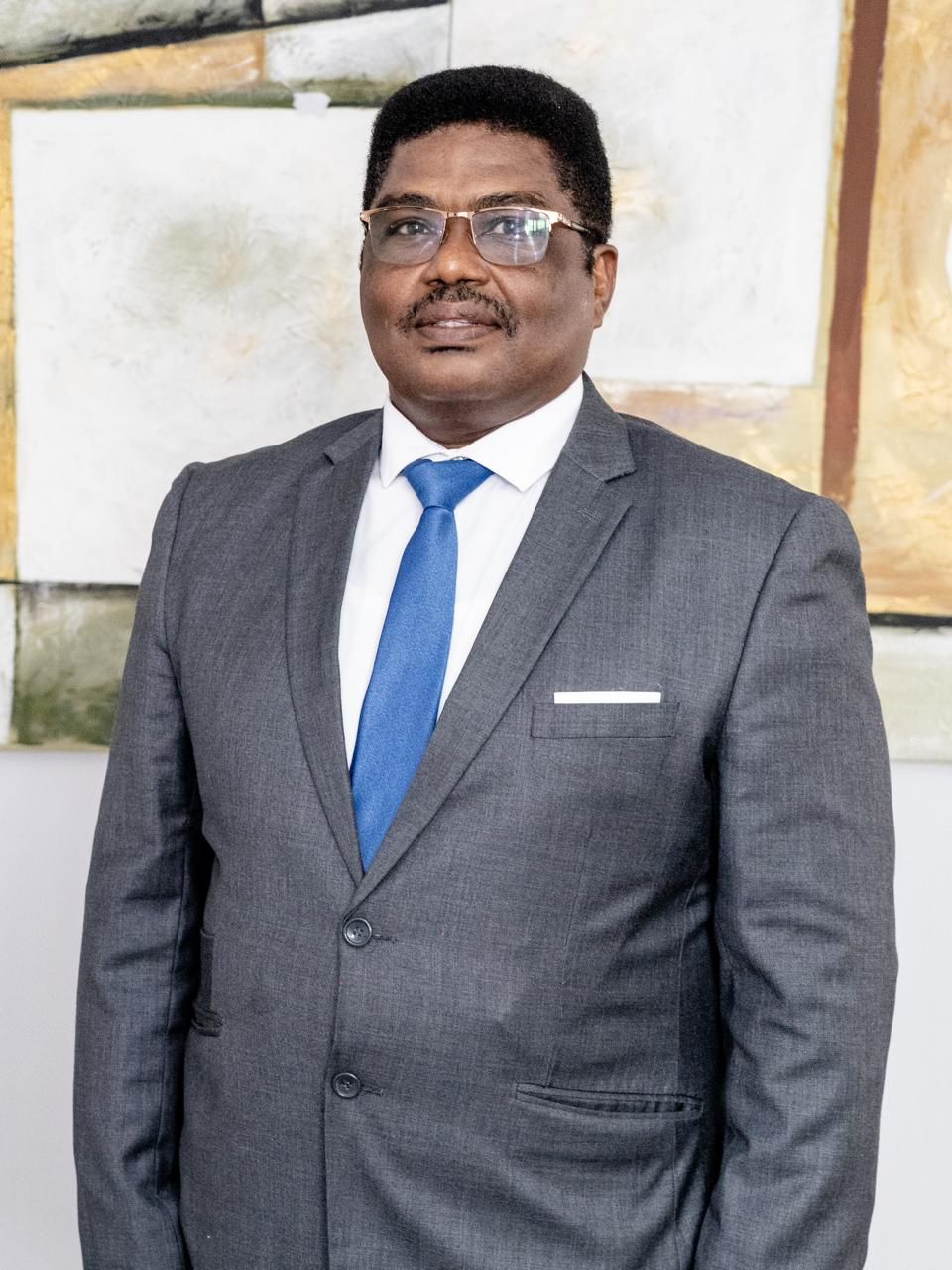
- João Carlos Tavares Fidalgo in 2025
- Born: João Carlos Tavares Fidalgo; 25 September 1966 (age 59); Praia, Santiago, Cape Verde, Cape Verde
- Education: ISCTE – University Institute of Lisbon
- Occupations: Economist, financial manager and public administrator
- Employer: Fundo Soberano de Garantia do Investimento Privado
- Known for: Chairmanship of the Private Investment Guarantee Sovereign Fund
- Title: Chairman of the Board of Directors
- Website: https://fundosoberano.cv/

João Carlos Tavares Fidalgo (born 25 September 1966 in Praia, Santiago, Cape Verde) is a Cape Verdean economist, financial manager and public administrator. He is the chairman of the Board of Directors of the Private Investment Guarantee Sovereign Fund (FSGIP), a public financial institution in Cape Verde linked to the mobilisation of guarantees for the financing of private investment.

Throughout his career, he has been linked to the Bank of Cape Verde, the national banking sector and financial supervision, and has also held management and liquidation roles at Novo Banco, S.A. in Cape Verde.

== Early life and education ==
João Carlos Tavares Fidalgo was born in the city of Praia, on the island of Santiago, Cape Verde. He holds a degree in economics, a master's degree in Business Management and an MBA in Global Management.

In 2007, he completed a master's degree in management at ISCTE – University Institute of Lisbon, in Portugal, with a dissertation on business financing in Cape Verde and the role of the banking sector.

=== Further training ===
During his professional career, Fidalgo attended several international specialised programmes in banking supervision, financial stability, risk management, microfinance and anti-money laundering.

Year	Institution	Area of training
2000	International Monetary Fund (IMF), Washington, D.C.	Banking risk regulation and supervision
2001	Monetary Authority of Macau	Banking and insurance assessment
2008	Banque de France	Risk regulation and supervision
2011	Bank of Portugal	Financial stability
2012	ATTF – Agence de Transfert de Technologie Financière	Risk implementation and analysis (Basel II)
2015	GIABA	Risk assessment and anti-money laundering
2015	Boulder Microfinance Programme, Italy	Microfinance
2019	House Training Luxembourg	Risk management in microfinance
2019	European Investment Bank (EIB)	Supervision, regulation and microfinance
2019	European Investment Bank (EIB)	Digital economy and financial transformation challenges

== Professional career ==
=== Bank of Cape Verde ===
Fidalgo developed much of his career at the Bank of Cape Verde (BCV), where he held positions in financial supervision, legal affairs and microfinance.

Period	Position
1997–1999	Coordinator of the Banking Supervision Area
1999–2013	Director of the Financial Institutions Supervision Department
2000–2004	Member of the Exchange Cooperation Monitoring Commission
2002–2004	Director of the Legal Department
2016–2018	Coordinator of the Microfinance Office

=== Academic activity ===
Alongside his work in the financial sector, Fidalgo taught in Cape Verdean higher education institutions in areas related to economics, banking, financial control and risk analysis.

Period	Institution	Subjects taught
2006–2011	Jean Piaget University of Cape Verde	Financial control, banking and insurance risk analysis, financial management and banking management
2007–2011	ISCEE University	Economics and financial control

=== Novo Banco ===
In 2017, in the context of the intervention of the Bank of Cape Verde in Novo Banco, S.A., Fidalgo assumed the roles of chairman of the board of directors and of the Liquidation Commission of the institution.

Period	Position	Institution
2017–2021	Chairman of the board of directors and of the Liquidation Commission	Novo Banco, S.A.

=== Private Investment Guarantee Sovereign Fund ===
In January 2021, he was appointed executive director of the Private Investment Guarantee Sovereign Fund.

In July 2022, he was reappointed by a new government order.

In April 2025, through Portaria No. 9/2025, he was appointed chairman of the Board of Directors of the Private Investment Guarantee Sovereign Fund.

During his tenure, the Fund strengthened institutional cooperation with national and international financial entities.

Period	Position
2021–2025	Executive director
2025–present	Chairman of the Board of Directors

== See also ==
- Private Investment Guarantee Sovereign Fund
- Bank of Cape Verde
- Economy of Cape Verde
