= Oceanpress =

Cape Verde newspaper

- Type: Weekly
- Format: Regional
- Founded: 2014
- Headquarters: Santa Maria, Sal, Cape Verde
- Website: Official website

Oceanpress (Portuguese meaning "The Week") is a weekly newspaper published in the island of Sal, Cape Verde and is headquartered in Santa Maria.

== Overview ==
Oceanpress is the only newspaper in Sal. Its slogan includes Noticias de Cabo Verde which also features national stories on paper and online.

The newspaper published its first number in 2014 making it the newest newspaper publication in the archipelago.

== Contents ==
Oceanpress features top stories as well as sports from the island and across and outside the archipelago, weather, businesses, arts and entertainment and more, from the island as well as from Cape Verde. It features pages about news stories, newspaper pictures and sports online.

== See also ==
- Newspapers in Cape Verde
- List of companies in Cape Verde
