= VozDiPovo-Online =

- Type: Online
- Format: Cape Verdean
- Owner: Amílcar Tavares
- Founded: 5 July 2004
- Headquarters: Aveiro, Portugal
- Website: Official website

VozDiPovo-Online (Capevedean Creole (main usage) for Voice of the People) is a Capeverdean online newspaper that covers top stories from Cape Verde and is based in Aveiro, Portugal. It serves the Capeverdean community in Portugal and has articles written in Portuguese and Capeverdean Creole and rarely English. Its founder is Amílcar Tavares, who is the current writer and editor-in-chief.

== Information ==
The main topics includes stories from other Lusophone countries (even secondary), the CPLP, the remainder of Africa at the continental level, world stories and some stories from other parts of the Solar System. It also covers other topics including society, culture, economy and sports. The newspaper is divided into sections including Cape Verde, the Forum, National football (soccer) teams, Opinion Forms, GigaVoz and the Letter's Voice.

== Writers ==
Some of its writers include Amilcar Aristides Monteiro, Edson Medina, Fernando Elísio Freire, José Maria Veiga, Lamanary Pina, Luís Carlos Silva and Onuana Varelis.

== See also ==
- Newspapers in Cape Verde
- List of newspapers in Portugal
