= 2001 in Cape Verde =

- Decades: 1980s; 1990s; 2000s; 2010s; 2020s
- See also: Other events of 2001; Timeline of Cabo Verdean history

The following lists events that happened during 2001 in Cape Verde.

== Incumbents ==
- President:
  - António Mascarenhas Monteiro
  - Pedro Pires
- Prime Minister:
  - Gualberto do Rosário
  - José Maria Neves

== Events ==
- Jean Piaget University of Cape Verde established in Praia
- January 14: Cape Verdean parliamentary election took place
- February 1: José Maria Neves becomes Prime Minister of Cape Verde
- February 11-26: Cape Verdean presidential election took place
- March 22: Pedro Pires becomes President of Cape Verde

== Arts and entertainment ==
- Vasco Martins' fourth symphony titled Buda Dharma (Budda Dharma) was completed
- June 5: Cesária Évora's album São Vicente di Longe' released

== Sports ==
- Onze Unidos won the Cape Verdean Football Championship

== Deaths ==
- Orlando Pantera (b. 1967)
