= Electra (company) =

Electric and water utility company of Cape Verde

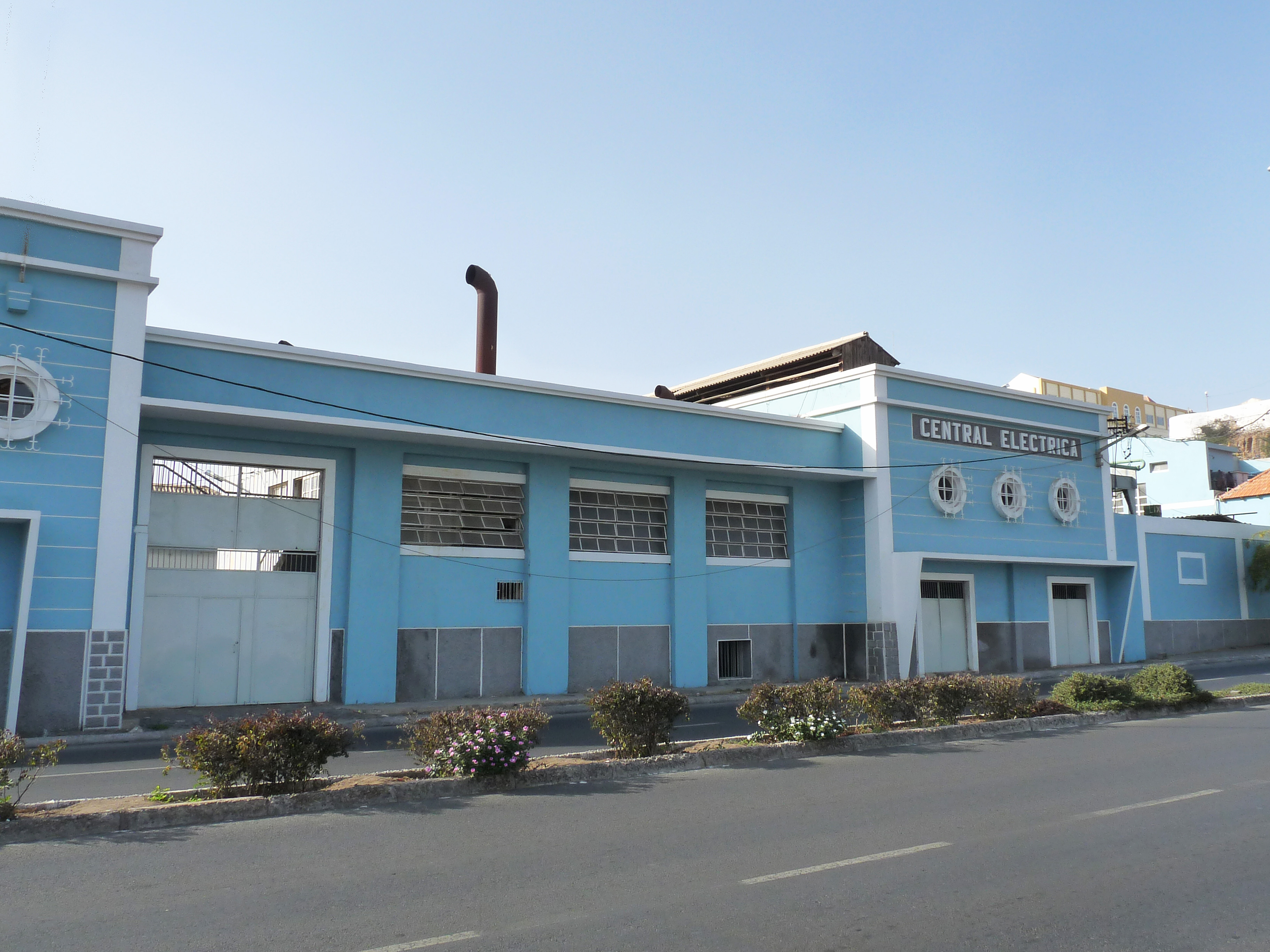
- Power plant in Praia
- Company type: S.A.
- Founded: April 17, 1982
- Headquarters: Av. Dr. Baltazar Lopes da Silva, Mindelo, Cape Verde
- Products: electricity, water
- Website: www.electra.cv

Electra is the main electricity and water company in Cape Verde. It was founded as a public company on April 17, 1982 (under decree-law no. 37/1982) by the merger of Electricidade e Água do Mindelo (EAM - Mindelo Electricity and Water), Central Eléctrica da Praia (CEP - Praia Central Electricity) and Electricidade e Água do Sal (EAS - Sal Electricity and Water). In 1998 it was converted into a public limited company. In December 1999 the majority of the stocks was sold to Portuguese companies: 30.6% to Electricidade de Portugal and 20.4% to Águas de Portugal. Since 2013, the company consists of three entities:

- the main company Electra SA, with headquarters in Mindelo
- the regional company Electra Norte, covering the islands São Vicente, Sal, Santo Antão and São Nicolau, with headquarters in Mindelo
- the regional company Electra Sul, covering the islands Santiago, Fogo, Maio and Brava, with headquarters in Praia

Electra serves all islands of Cape Verde except Boa Vista, where electricity and water are produced and distributed by the public-private company Águas e Energia de Boavista.

== See also ==
- List of companies in Cape Verde
