= Olavo Correia =

Cape Verdean economist and politician

Olavo Avelino Garcia Correia
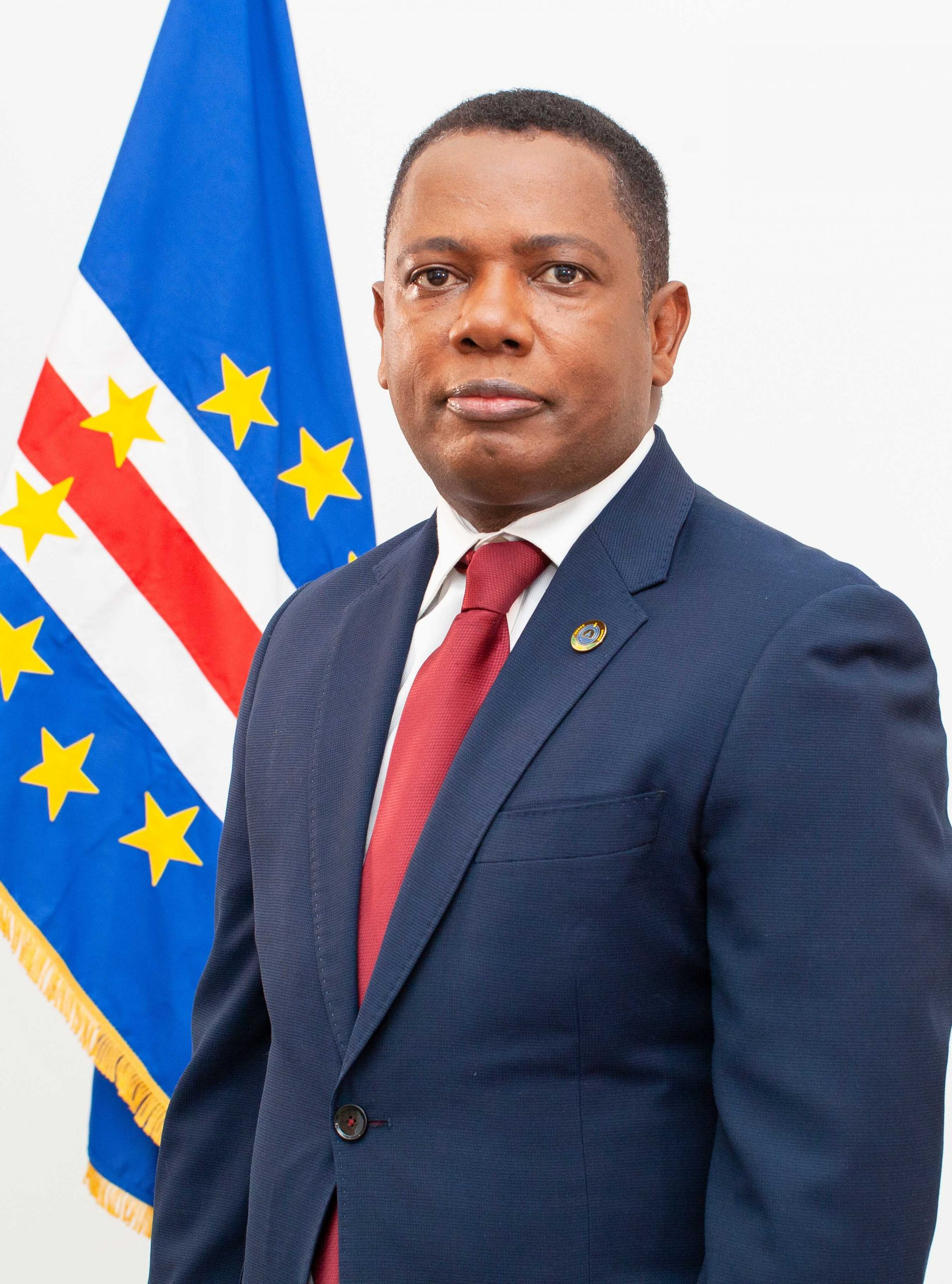
- Olavo Correia, Deputy Prime Minister of Cape Verde.

Deputy Prime Minister of Cape Verde (2021 – present).

Minister of Finance (2025 – present).

Minister of Finance and Business Development (2016 – 2025).

Minister of Digital Economy (2018 – present).

Personal details
- Born: February 10, 1967 (age 59) Praia, Santiago Island, Cape Verde
- Party: MpD
- Education: Economics studies in Berlin, Germany; postgraduate studies in Business Management in Riedenburg, Bavaria
- Occupation: Politician
- Profession: Economist

Olavo Avelino Garcia Correia (born 10 February 1967, Praia) is a Cape Verdean economist and politician. He currently serves as Deputy Prime Minister of Cape Verde, Minister of Finance and Minister of Digital Economy in the government led by Ulisses Correia e Silva.

== Early life and education ==
Olavo Correia was born in the city of Praia, on the island of Santiago. He pursued higher education in Germany, studying economics in Berlin. He later completed postgraduate studies in Business Management in Riedenburg, Bavaria.

== Professional career ==
Correia began his professional career at the Bank of Cape Verde, where he worked in the departments of Markets and Economic Studies and Statistics.

In 1997 he was appointed Director-General of the Treasury and later served as Secretary of State assisting the Minister of Finance.

Between 1999 and 2003 he served as Governor of the Bank of Cape Verde.

He later worked in the financial and business sectors, including as a board member of the Tecnicil Group and managing director of Banco Montepio Geral Cabo Verde.

Correia has also served as a visiting professor of economics at the Instituto Superior de Ciências Jurídicas e Sociais.

== Political activity ==
In April 2016 he joined the government led by Ulisses Correia e Silva as Minister of Finance and Business Development.

Since 2018 he has also overseen the portfolio of the Digital Economy.

In 2021 he was appointed Deputy Prime Minister of Cape Verde.

In February 2025, following a government reorganisation published in the official gazette, the ministry was renamed Ministry of Finance, replacing the previous designation of Ministry of Finance and Business Development.

== Other activities ==
Throughout his career he has held several institutional roles, including member of the Advisory Council of the Bank of Cape Verde, member of the Council of the Republic, and president of the EPIF Football Integral Preparation School Foundation.

In 2022 he was elected President of the Board of Governors of the ECOWAS Bank for Investment and Development (EBID).
