= Caixa Económica de Cabo Verde =

Cape Verdean commercial bank

- Company type: Commercial bank
- Founded: May 18, 1928
- Headquarters: Praia, Cape Verde
- Website: www.caixa.cv

The Caixa Económica de Cabo Verde is a Cape Verdean commercial bank. Its headquarters are at Avenida Cidade de Lisboa in Praia. It was established in 1928 as Caixa Económica Postal. In 1985 it was transformed into an autonomous financial institution named Caixa Económica de Cabo Verde. In 1993 it became a limited liability company.

== See also ==
- List of companies in Cape Verde
- List of banks in Cape Verde
