= 2000 in Cape Verde =

- Decades: 1980s; 1990s; 2000s; 2010s; 2020s
- See also: History of Cape Verde; List of years in Cape Verde

The following lists events that happened during 2000 in Cape Verde.

== Incumbents ==
- President: António Mascarenhas Monteiro
- Prime Minister:
  - Carlos Veiga
  - Gualberto do Rosário

== Events ==
- Cape Verde ratified two UN protocols, the First Optional Protocol to the International Covenant on Civil and Political Rights and the Second Optional Protocol to the International Covenant on Civil and Political Rights, aiming at the abolition of the death penalty
- February: Museu da Tabanka opened in the center of Assomada
- June 16 census: Population: 428,079
- July 30: Prime Minister Carlos Veiga resigns, Gualberto do Rosário becomes acting Prime Minister

== Sports ==
- Winter: the Boa Vista Opening Tournament held its first edition
- Winter: the Fogo Opening Tournament held its first edition
- Winter: the Sal Island Super Cup held its first edition
- May 4-14: The 2000 Amílcar Cabral Cup was held in Praia
- FC Derby won the Cape Verdean Football Championship

== Births ==
- January 3: Kenny Rocha, footballer
