= Cabo Verde Investimentos =

Cape Verdean agency

- Type: State owned company
- Industry: Economic development, Investments
- Founded: August 27, 1990
- Headquarters: Praia, Cape Verde
- Owner: Government of Cape Verde
- Number of employees: 29
- Website: www.cvinvest.cv

Cabo Verde Invesimentos (CI) (Portuguese for Cape Verdean Investments) is a Cape Verdean agency promoting national and foreign investments and exports. Among its main objectives are the promotion of conditions conducive to the realization of national and foreign investment projects as well as the promotion of the export of Cape Verdean goods and services.

== History ==
The company was first named as PROMEX (Promoção Turística, do Investimento e das Exportações - Touristic, Investment and Exportations Promotions) formed on August 27, 1990 under law no. 69/9, it was altered on January 21, 1992. A new name was accepted under resoluon number 21/2004 on September 21 which merged IADE (Instututo de Apoio a Desenvolvimento) Empresarial (Company Development Business Institute) and PROMEX and would become CI (Cabo Verde Investimentos).

The new name was made into CI under the resolution of the Ministry of Councils's law no. 21/2004 on September 27 creating the Cabo Verde Investimentos - Agência Cabo-Verdiana that promotes investments.

Today the organization makes up of 29 employees including the Board of Directors.

== Missions ==
- Promoting Cape Verde as a destination of investments in tourism
- Promoting the development of competitive advantages in the country
- Promoting business programs in product exports and services
- Identifying and attracting the outer investor
- Contributing for the reduction

== Activity areas ==
Cabo Verde Investimentos is the first contact point for investments in cape Verde. Its organization is responsible for promoting and facilitating investments in the country. Its main function is the stimulation of development, expansion and growth in its economy promoting the country with a competitive business. center. With its purpose which created the electronic platform “Balcão Único de Investimento” ("Single Investment Counter"). The platform will print more efficiency and usage in investment process between CI and its clients and other investors, public and private organizations, project promoters of national and foreign investments The investments are ensured that they are completed within 75 days.

There are two forms which the same submits the investment project into approval, in presence or distance, having the last with the support of the CI's institutional since.

CI has supported a number of successful companies and enterprise to establish in the country including hotel providers such as RIU, Hilton and The Resort Group.

Overall, countries that invest in Cape Verde were the countries of the European Union including Spain, Italy, the United Kingdom, Ireland and Portugal. Recently other countries invested into the country including Angola, Brazil and some other African countries.

== See also ==
- List of companies of Cape Verde
