= 1997 in Cape Verde =

- Decades: 1970s; 1980s; 1990s; 2000s; 2010s
- See also: Other events of 1997; Timeline of Cabo Verdean history

The following lists events that happened during 1997 in Cape Verde.

== Incumbents ==
- President: António Mascarenhas Monteiro
- Prime Minister: Carlos Veiga

== Events ==
- Cape Verde ratified the UN treaty, the International Convention on the Protection of the Rights of All Migrant Workers and Members of Their Families
- October 5: Museu Etnográfico da Praia (Praia Ethnographic Museum) first opened

== Arts and entertainment ==
- March 18: Cesária Évora's album Cabo Verde released
- May: National television channel TCV was established

== Sports ==
- Sporting Clube da Praia won the Cape Verdean Football Championship

== Births ==
- 23 February: Márcio Rosa, footballer
- 15 July: Erin Pinheiro, footballer
