= Ronivaldo =

Ronivaldo is a male given name. Notable people with the name include:

- Ronivaldo Conceição (born 1972), Brazilian squash player
- Ronivaldo (footballer) (born 1989), full name Ronivaldo Bernardo Sales, Brazilian football forward
- Ronivaldo Cruz (born 1995), Cape Verdean football centre-back
