= 1998 in Cape Verde =

- Decades: 1970s; 1980s; 1990s; 2000s; 2010s
- See also: Other events of 1998; Timeline of Cabo Verdean history

The following lists events that happened during 1998 in Cape Verde.

== Incumbents ==
- President: António Mascarenhas Monteiro
- Prime Minister: Carlos Veiga

== Events ==
- Bolsa de Valores de Cabo Verde (Cape Verdean Stock Exchange) established in Praia
- Cabo Verde Express airline established
- May 11: Gualberto do Rosário becomes Deputy Prime Minister
- September 28: a TACV de Havilland Canada DHC-6 Twin Otter (registered D4-CAX) crash-landed at Francisco Mendes International Airport in Praia, killing one
- November: Labour and Solidarity Party (Partido de Trabalho e Solidariedade, PTS) established

== Sports ==
- CS Mindelense won the Cape Verdean Football Championship

== Births ==
- June 14: Jovane Cabral, footballer
