= Kontinuasom =

2009 film

- Poster for the film
- Directed by: Óscar Martínez
- Screenplay by: Francisco Pascual
- Produced by: Útopi ASAD Animasur. RTCV (Radio Televisión Cabo Verde)
- Cinematography: David Dominguez
- Edited by: Noemi García Irene Cardona Raquel Conde
- Release date: 2009
- Running time: 80 minutes
- Countries: Cape Verde; Spain

Kontinuasom is a 2010 documentary film which was released in Cape Verde and Spain. It was directed by Oscar Martinez. The film describes the musical heritage and culture of Cape Verde.

== Synopsis ==
Beti is a dancer in the Raiz di Polon company in Cape Verde. She receives an offer from Lisbon to join a Cape Verde music show and start a new career there. The offer unchains the deep-set Cape Verde conflict in her: identity built on the Diaspora century after century. Doubts, nostalgia, uprooting, they all soar over her and accompany her decision. The same dilemma that surrounds all Cape Verdeans, the yearning to leave, the yearning to return. Expressed and brought together around music, hallmark of the people of Cape Verde.

== Production ==
Kontinuasom was shot from 2008 to 2010. Scenes were shot in both Cape Verde and Lisbon. It was produced by ASAD, Útopi, Animasur. It was funded by AECID. The music was generated live, and included native Cape Verdean and Portuguese genres, including batuka and morna.

== Reception ==
The film won the Fifai Le Port Award, and the International Film Festival of Africa and the Reunion Islands for being the best documentary. The Minister of Higher Education, Science and Innovation, António Leão de Aguiar Correia e Silva (a member of the cabinet of José Maria Neves) declared the Kontinuasom a "national cultural value and audiovisual heritage of Cape Verde, for its artistic, cultural and social values and for the participation in the dissemination of Cape Verdean culture in the world".
