= TCV Internacional =

Televisão de Cabo Verde
- Country: Cape Verde
- Broadcast area: Cape Verde

Programming
- Language: Portuguese
- Picture format: 16:9; HDTV

Ownership
- Owner: Rádiotelevisão Caboverdiana

History
- Launched: May 3, 2013; 13 years ago

TCV Internacional, also known as TCVi, is the international channel of Rádiotelevisão Caboverdiana. Its programming consists exclusively of programs produced for Televisão de Cabo Verde. Launched in 2013 and marketed by French company Thema, it targets Portugal, Angola and Mozambique; in Portugal, it is available as a premium channel since its inception.

== History ==
A schedule proposal was made by TCV director Waldemar Pires in February 2013 for Thema, its commercial partner. Subsequently, its French partner announced that TCV Internacional would be distributed using the Eutelsat W2A satellite for interested providers.

TCV Internacional started broadcasting at 5:33pm Cape Verde Time (7:33pm in Lisbon), 33 minutes later than initially planned, after one month of experimental broadcasts. The channel launched with a special ceremony with the president of Cape Verde Luís Neves and launched on three Portuguese TV providers, ZON, MEO and Cabovisão, as a free preview throughout May before starting subscription broadcasts. Later, it was announced that it would expand to France - via Thema - and later to Angola and South Africa.

In 2022, RTC announced that it would relaunch TCV Internacional to better serve the diaspora, and use it as a potential new source of revenue for the corporation.
