= Televisão Independente de Cabo Verde =

- Company type: Private
- Industry: Television
- Founded: 2007
- Headquarters: Praia, Cape Verde
- Key people: Rui Pereira
- Owner: Sociedade de Comunicação para o Desenvolvimento – SCD, SA
- Website: tiver.cv

Televisão Independente de Cabo Verde (TIVER) is a Cape Verdean private television channel established in 2007 by Rui Pereira.

== History ==
In 2006, the Cape Verdean government announced bids for private television channels, revealing the results in January 2007, giving licenses to Record Cabo Verde and TIVER.

In early December 2014, its staff began a one-week strike because of unpaid salaries. The measures were applied due to corporate restructuring, lacking the logistic abilities to restore some of its staff.

As of 2015, when Cape Verde was implementing its digital terrestrial television network, its analog terrestrial coverage was limited to on transmitter on the island of São Vicente and two on Santiago. As part of the realignment for the DTT network, TIVER was given a slot on a free-to-air multiplex, contrasting the extant proposal which paired it with other free-to-air channels available.

A team of TIVER journalists won the 2021 Cape Verde National Journalism Awards for their social reports.
