= Banco Caboverdiano de Negócios =

Commercial bank in Cape Verde

- Type: Commercial bank
- Founded: 2003
- Headquarters: Av. Amílcar Cabral, Praia, Cape Verde
- Key people: Luís Vasconcelos Lopes
- Website: https://bcn.cv/pt_PT/

The Banco Caboverdiano de Negócios (Portuguese meaning "Capeverdean Business Bank") is a Cape Verdean commercial bank. Its headquarters are at Avenida Amílcar Cabral, in the city centre of Praia. The current president of its board of directors is Luís Vasconcelos Lopes.

== History ==
The company was founded in 2003 as Banco Totta de Cabo Verde (BTCV) — a local subsidiary of the Portuguese Banco Totta & Açores acquired by Banco Santander in 2000. In October 2004 BTCV was acquired by the Cape Verdean company Sociedade para o Estudo e Promoção do Investimento, and in February 2005 its name was changed to the current Banco Caboverdiano de Negócios.

In 2017 IMPAR acquired the majority of BCN shares.

== See also ==
- List of companies in Cape Verde
- List of banks in Cape Verde
