= Relative thermal index =

Index of resistance to thermal degradation

The Relative thermal index (RTI) is a characteristic parameter related to the ability of plastic materials to resist thermal degradation.

The RTI is part of the longterm thermal aging program (LTTA) described in the UL 746B standard from UL.

During the process of the UL 746B program, the degradation in hot air of certain properties of the material like dielectric and mechanic strength, is investigated with regards to thermal-aging. For a full study, the candidate material (B) is aged together with a reference material A (control) with already known RTI value in the same ovens. The RTI is the rounded temperature in degrees C, at which the properties of B have decreased to 50 percent of their initial value in about the same amount of time (correlation time) than it takes for A at its own RTI value. A maximum correlation time of 60.000 hours is considered acceptable for many electrical applications, however it may also become as low as 5.000 hours according to UL 746B. If a material has not been investigated (yet), the RTI shown is based on the generic class (polymer type) of the material.

Though the RTI is an index, it is given in Celsius units. The UL 746B standard distinguishes between three sub-categories of the RTI:

- Electrical RTI which relates to electrical insulating performance.
- Mechanical impact RTI which relates to mechanical performance with impact
- Mechanical strength RTI which relates to mechanical performance without impact

There is also the RTI Elongation (by means of Elongation at break) for films and other nonrigid materials.

== Literature ==
- UL 746B, 5. Ed.: Polymeric Materials – Long Term Property Evaluations
- N. Navarro: Predicting Elevated Temperature Ratings of Polymeric Materials in C. White et al.: Service Life Prediction of Exterior Plastics, New York: Springer (2014), ISBN 9783319060330
- G. Mediratta, et al. Over Time and Under Heat, Polycarbonates Hold Up: Plastics Eng. 67 (7) (2011), p. 24
