= TV Cidade (Cape Verde) =

- Type: Private
- Industry: Television
- Founded: 1 July 2022
- Headquarters: Praia, Cape Verde
- Owner: Cidade Comunicações, S.A.
- Website: tvcidade.cv

TV Cidade is a Cape Verdean privately owned television channel owned by Cidade Comunicações, S.A., also known as Rádio TV Cidade. It is the TV version of Rádio Cidade, offering a schedule consisting largely of music videos.

== History ==
Cidade Comunicações received its license from the regulator ARC in January 2022. On 30 June, it was publicly unveiled in a ceremony featuring Secretary of State Lourenço Lopes regarding the growth of the audiovisual sector in Cape Verde. The following evening (1 July) at 8pm, broadcasts started, in high definition on the terrestrial platform.

The station was notified on 19 January 2023 to build its own schedule and create its own news operation within a 120-day period.

== Programming ==
In addition to music videos, the station also covers local music festivals such as the Santo Amaro Festival and special events such as the Sportsmídia Gala.

As of 2023, the station lacked a regular programming other than music videos, and was notified by ARC on the issue, having lacked a "diversified" schedule during prime time.
