= Platiny Alves =

Cape Verdean footballer (born 1996)

Platiny
Personal information
- Full name: Platiny Mário Lopes Alves
- Date of birth: 2 January 1996 (age 30)
- Place of birth: Cape Verde
- Position: Midfielder

Team information
- Current team: Career break

Youth career
- 2013–2015: Gil Vicente

Senior career*
Years	Team	Apps	(Gls)
2015–2016	Gil Vicente	13	(0)
- * Club domestic league appearances and goals as of 20 March 2016

Platiny Mário Lopes Alves (born 2 January 1996) simply Platiny, is a Cape Verdean professional footballer who last played for Gil Vicente F.C. as a midfielder. He is currently having a career break due to a charge of documentation forgery.

== Football career ==
On 21 January 2015, Platiny made his professional debut with Gil Vicente in a 2014–15 Taça da Liga match against Marítimo.
