= Unitel T+ =

Cape Verdean telecommunication company

- Industry: Telecommunications
- Founded: 21 December 2007
- Headquarters: Praia, Cape Verde
- Products: Telecommunications services Internet services
- Website: www.uniteltmais.cv

Unitel T+ is a Cape Verdean telecommunications company owned by Angolan company Unitel.

== History ==
The company started operating on 21 December 2007 as T+, breaking Cabo Verde Telecom's monopoly in the mobile sector.

In October 2012, T+ was acquired by Unitel's subsidiary Unitel International. In 2020, it won a litigation against CVTelecom for the installation of an undersea cable in Praia. In 2021, it launched its television platform, Casa+ TV. With its launch, SPI International started providing its channels to the new market. As of 2023, it had more subscribers than CVT/Alou in the islands of Boavista, Sal and Santiago.
