= Artiletra =

- Cover of the 68th edition of the newspaper, from June/July, 2005.
- Type: bi-monthly
- Format: A3
- Owner(s): Larissa Rodrigues and João Baptista Rodrigues
- Publisher: Gráfica da Praia
- Editor: Vadinho Velhinho
- Founded: April 15, 1991
- Language: Portuguese
- Headquarters: Mindelo on the island of São Vicente, Cape Verde
- Website: artiletra.blogspot.com

Artiletra (a portmanteau of the Portuguese expression "Arte e Letra", meaning "Art and Letter") is a Cape Verdean bi-monthly newspaper/magazine. It is headquartered in Mindelo, and is the most circulated non-generalist newspaper in Cape Verde. Artiletra features articles and essays, as well as literary fiction (short stories and poetry), often by prominent Cape Verdean writers, covering topics such as the Cape Verdean culture, education, and science.

On April 15, 2001, the newspaper celebrated its 10th anniversary, on April 15, 2016, it celebrated its 25th anniversary.

== Notable writers ==
One of the notable writers included Gualberto do Rosário who was also a politician.

== See also ==
- Mass media in Cape Verde
