= Televisão Educativa (Cape Verde) =

Cape Verdean television channel

- Type: Private
- Industry: Television
- Founded: 1 October 2020
- Headquarters: Praia, Cape Verde
- Owner: Rádio Televisão Educativa (Ministry of Education of Cape Verde)
- Website: radioeducativa.gov.cv/tv

Televisão Educativa (abbreviated TV Educativa or TVE) is a Cape Verdean publicly-owned television channel owned by Rádio Televisão Educativa. The channel mainly airs televised classes, which, at its beginning, were also seen on other television channels.

== History ==
The idea of an educational television channel was first mooted as early as 2009, where the Ministry of Education was hypothesizing the creation of Rádio Televisão Educativa for distance learning during the then-upcoming 2009-2010 school year. The ministry already owned a radio station.

A television license was given to RTE on 8 September 2020. When the pandemic broke out earlier in the year, the ministry conducted its first television tests by producing TV classes for existing channels to mitigate the lack of classes, giving impulse to the project. With the new school year, its classes were meant to be complementary to the ones in schools. Broadcasts started on 1 October; on 7 October, Maria da Luz Rodrigues Andrade solicited a request to regulator ARC to become its director, this was subsequently approved on 27 October.

In 2022, after the pandemic subsided, the project was kept as it was useful to bring educational content to every school-age student in the country.

== Programming ==
At launch time, in addition to televised classes, the channel was set to carry children and youth programming, mostly entertainment and sports, a news program showing a youthful view of national and international events, documentaries and "formative programs with a strong emphasis on the area of citizenship". Programming had a phased launch, with its newscast not premiering until December 2020 and in-house production of classes until January 2021.
