= IMPAR =

- Company type: Insurance
- Founded: 1992
- Headquarters: Praia, Cape Verde
- Website: www.impar.cv

IMPAR is a leading insurance company of Cape Verde. Its headquarters are on Avenida Amílcar Cabral in Praia. It has 11 offices in the islands of Santiago, São Vicente, São Nicolau, Santo Antão, Sal, Boa Vista and Fogo. It was established in January 1992 as the first private insurance company of Cape Verde.

IMPAR Group consists of Seguradora IMPAR and Banco Caboverdiano de Negócios.

== See also ==
- List of companies in Cape Verde
