= Ailton (Cape Verdean footballer) =

Cape Verdean footballer (born 1996)

Ailton Silva
Personal information
- Full name: Ailton César Duarte Silva
- Date of birth: 5 January 1996 (age 30)
- Place of birth: Mindelo, Cape Verde
- Position: Forward

Team information
- Current team: Sporting Braga B

Youth career
- 2013–2015: Gil Vicente
- 2015: Sporting Braga

Senior career*
| Years | Team | Apps | (Gls) |
| 2015 | Gil Vicente | 0 | (0) |
| 2015– | Sporting Braga B | 4 | (0) |
| 2015–2016 | → Trofense (loan) | 24 | (3) |
- * Club domestic league appearances and goals as of 21 September 2016

Ailton César Duarte Silva (born 5 January 1996) is a Cape Verdean footballer who plays for S.C. Braga B, as a forward.

== Career ==
On 21 January 2015, Ailton made his professional debut with Gil Vicente in a 2014–15 Taça da Liga match against Marítimo.
