= Flavio Dos Santos Dias =

Cape Verdean footballer (born 1995)

Flavio
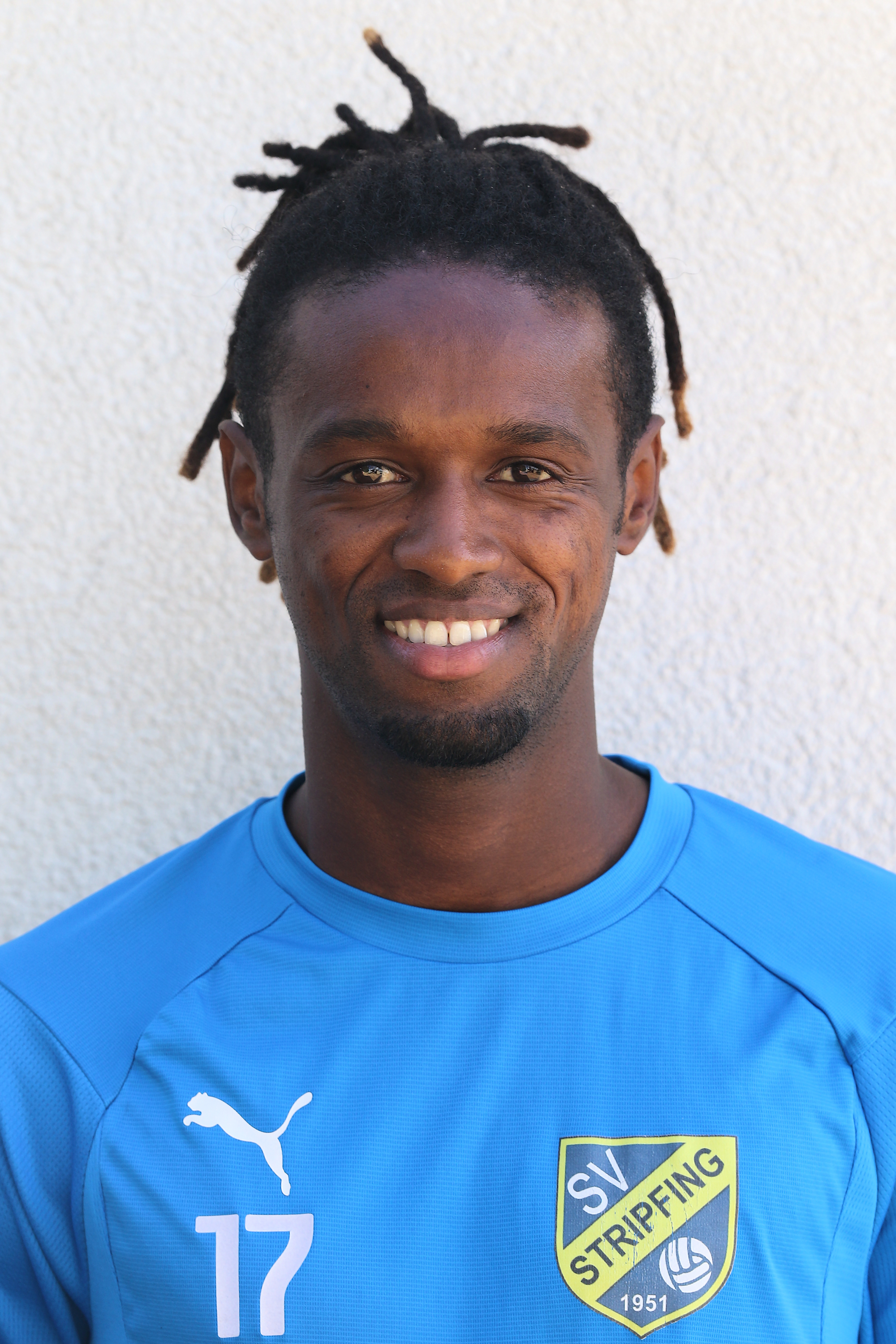

Personal information
- Full name: Flavio Dos Santos Dias
- Date of birth: December 16, 1995 (age 30)
- Place of birth: Cape Verde
- Height: 1.76 m (5 ft 9 1/2 in)
- Position: Winger

Team information
- Current team: Floridsdorfer AC
- Number: 13

Youth career
- –2014: Sporting CP

Senior career*
Years	Team	Apps	(Gls)
2014–2015	Admira Wacker II	19	(1)
2015	→ SV Stripfing (loan)	6	(1)
2015–2018	Floridsdorfer AC	69	(6)
2018–2020	SV Ried	5	(0)
2019	→ SKU Amstetten (loan)	12	(0)
2019–2020	→ SV Stripfing (loan)	17	(6)
2020–	Floridsdorfer AC	147	(13)
- * Club domestic league appearances and goals as of 17 May 2026

Flavio dos Santos Dias (born December 16, 1995) is a Cape Verdean footballer who plays as a winger for Austrian 2. Liga club Floridsdorfer AC.

== Club career ==
On 7 September 2020, he returned to Floridsdorfer AC, after having formerly played for the club from 2015 to 2018.
