= Óscar Santos =

Cape Verdean banker politician

- Born: Óscar Humberto Évora Santos; September 8, 1960 (age 65)
- Occupation: Governor
- Years active: 1991-present
- Organization: Bank Of Cape Verde

Óscar Humberto Évora Santos (b. September 8, 1960) in Lém Ferriera, Cabo Verde is a Cape Verdean politician and the Governor of the central Bank of Cape Verde.

Santos was the president of Praia city council from 2016 to 2020. He began serving as Governor of Banco de Cabo Verde on 4 January 2021.

== Early life ==
Oscar holds a Bachelor's degree in Economic Theory and Quantitative Methods and Master's degree in Economics, Specialization in Business and Finance, from American University.

== Career ==
He worked with the World Bank in 1994 and the United Nations in 2000.

Oscar served as Mayor of Praia from 2016 to 2020,
