= Corsino Fortes =

Cape Verdean writer, poet and diplomat

- Born: Corsino António Fortes; 14 February 1933; Mindelo, Cape Verde
- Died: 24 July 2015 (aged 82); Mindelo, Cape Verde
- Education: University of Lisbon
- Occupations: Writer, poet and diplomat

Corsino António Fortes (14 February 1933 – 24 July 2015) was a Cape Verdean writer, poet and diplomat. He served as the first Ambassador of Cape Verde to Portugal from 1975 until 1981, following his country's independence.

== Biography ==
Fortes was born in Mindelo on Cape Verde's São Vicente island in 1933. He is a graduate in law of the University of Lisbon (1966), chaired the Association of Cape Verde Writers (2003–2006) and is the author of some of the most significant works of Cape Verdean literature. He has worked as a teacher and a lawyer and he served as Cape Verde's ambassador to Portugal. He was a judge in Angola in the capital Luanda and Benguela and joined several governments in the Cape Verde Republic. He represented the PAICV.

Corsino Fortes's first book Pão & Fonema (Bread & Phoneme), which appeared in 1974, made an immediate impact. 1974 was a momentous year for Portugal and its African colonies as it was the year in which the authoritarian Estado Novo regime was overthrown, an act that began the process that led to the decolonisation of the Cape Verde Islands in 1975. Not long afterwards, he was the first Cape Verdean ambassador to Portugal for a year. He became the first ever Cape Verdean ambassador to France on August 25, 1976, and served until December 2, 1981, which was succeeded by André Corsino Tolentino.

When Corsino Fortes was deputy secretary to the Prime Minister and Minister of Social Communications, he inspired a television model of Iceland in which television stations existed and operated in small cities and proved the experimental mode for the country's model, a few years before RTC started television broadcasting in 1997.

After Pão & Fonema, he published Arvore e Tambor (Tree and Drum) in 1986. Both Pão e Fonema and Árvore e Tambor expressed a new conscience of reality in Cape Verde and a new traditional and cultural works on the archipelago. He finished what he had long seen as a trilogy in 2001 with Pedras de Sol & Substância which was collected with the previous two books under the title A Cabeça Calva de Deus (The bald head of God), they were sagas on the freedom to the people. Sinos de Silencio was his last book, published in 2015.

In the final years of his life, he was interviewed along with Tomé Varela da Silva on December 3, 2008, in Nós Fora dos Eixos, later by RTC, the national television network in February 2010, later at a Brazilian university with Christina Ramalho on September 26, 2010 and by the country's major weekly newspaper A Semana in October 2013. Cosino Fortes died in Mindelo, Cape Verde, on July 24, 2015, at the age of 82. He was survived by three children.

== Works ==
- Pão & Fonema (1974)
- Árvore & Tombor (1986)
- Pedras de Sol & Substância (2001)
- A cabeça calva de Deus (2001)
- Sinos de Silencio (2015)

Some of his poems are a part of the Tertúlia poem collection featuring poems made by other poets.

Two of his poems De boca a barlavento (The Barlavento Mouth) and De boca concêntrica na roda do sol can be found on the CD Poesia de Cabo Verde e Sete Poemas de Sebastião da Gama (2007) by Afonso Dias.

Preceded by Position created	Cape Verdean ambassador to France; 1976-1981	Succeeded by André Corsino Tolentino
