= RTC (Cape Verde) =

Radio and television station in Cape Verde

Coordinates: 14.9098°N 23.5156°W

Radiotelevisão Caboverdiana
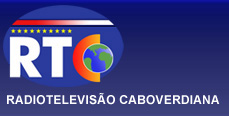
- Current RTC logo
- Type: Public
- Industry: Television, Radio
- Founded: 1 August 1997
- Headquarters: Rua 13 de Janeiro; Praia, Cape Verde
- Key people: José Emanuel Tavares Moreira
- Owner: Government of Cape Verde
- Website: rtc.cv

The Radiotelevisão Caboverdiana is Cape Verde's first radio and television station broadcasting local programs from Cape Verde, Portugal and Brazil as well as the rest of the world especially France. It is a publicly owned company and enterprise and is located in the Capeverdean capital city of Praia, in the southern part in the middle of Achada Santo António RTC also has a few buildings, it also has offices in São Vicente (serving the northwestern part), Sal (serving the northeastern part), São Filipe on Fogo Island (serving the southwestern part) and Assomada in Santa Catarina (serving Northern Santiago and possibly Maio). The building size is very small. The radio building is in the south on Rua 13 de Janeiro and the television station is in the north. Its current president is José Emanuel Tavares Moreira.

The station also broadcasts news, sports, television shows and recently broadcasts football coverages from Portugal and also from Brazil as well as Latin America but rarely around the world. The radio channel is branded as RCV, originally broadcast during the later part of the day and the evening in its early years and then most of the day and the evening, now it is a 24-hour radio station. The TV channel is branded as TCV and it is also available in Portugal in the principal cable and IPTV platforms as a premium channel under the name TCV Internacional. As of the late 2000s, TCV broadcast from noon to midnight. The first and only youth radion station is known as RCV+, Radio Cabo Verde Jovem which broadcasts from 7 AM until 10 PM.

== History and information ==
=== Radio ===
The radio services in Cape Verde began in the 1930s making it the first in the nation, first known as Rádio Colonial Portuguesa (Portuguese Colonial Radio, equivalent to RDP in what were its colonies), it began broadcasting news, sporting events including soccer games from the nation and Cape Verde. After independence from Portugal on 5 July 1975, its overseas section of RDP was no more and radio broadcasts as RCV began. Years later, more radio affiliates were made on other islands, one of the stations was Rádio Voz de São Vicente.

=== Television ===
Long before the first regular television broadcasts started in Cape Verde, the first attempts at bringing television came at the mercy of Chibeto Faria, a bank manager, who lived in the island of São Vicente. Since Cape Verde had no television station at the time, the closest television stations were from the Canary Islands (broadcasts started 1964) and Senegal (broadcasts started 1965, regularized around 1973). To receive these signals, Chibeto had to transport his television set by donkey to Monte Verde (approximately 5 kilometers). The television viewers at the time preferred feature films and football matches.

With a growing number of viewers and followers of Chibeto, he decided to look for assistance from technicians to study the feasibility of a television service covering Mindelo with assistance from a French technician. With no money to start work, he started a fundraising campaign to set up the service. This also included the installation of a television transmitter at Monte Verde. Few households had a television set.

Shortly afterwards, Hilário Brito, executive director of Cabo Verde Telecom, decided to implement a plan for the introduction of a television service in Praia, the national capital, with the aim of improving the newly independent country's communication infrastructure. The television transmitter at Monte Tchota was his first experience in telecommunications. In his first attempts, he received television signals from the Canary Islands. Like what happened before in Mindelo, the experiences in Monte Tchota had triggered the same effect: potential viewers went there on purpose to watch television. Locals later bought their television sets, with Hilário beginning a process to distribute the signals between Mount Tchota and Praia. Viewers were enticed by the programs coming out of the TVE station in the Canary Islands, but the schedule wasn't fixed, depending on the condition of the reception. Hilário's television station, dubbed "TV Hilário", started producing some content of its own, mixed with pirated content. His television station had no license and the international content was in violation of international property rights.

Corsino Flores set up the project for the television service, beginning investments in equipment and obtaining staff. The national television corporation was given the name Televisão Experimental de Cabo Verde or TEVEC, it started on 12 March 1984, nine years independence and started operating its regular service on 31 December 1984. It had 22 professionals and broadcast three days a week for several hours.

Over the years, TEVEC grew and increased its frequencies and transmissions. In its early years, the station broadcast four hours a day, from 8pm to midnight, using the SECAM-DK system.

Some years before the foundation, poet Corsino Fortes, then Deputy Secretary to the Prime Minister and titular Minister of Social Communications, inspired a television model of Iceland in which television stations existed and operated in small cities and proved the experimental mode for the country's model. The model worked even in its early years, below and above. In some shows, the signals abruptively interrupted. The station was known for its frequent transmission breakdowns

On 1 June 1990 (June 23, according to some sources), the name TNCV (Televisão Nacional CaboVerdiana) marked a new era in Capeverdean television and no longer became experimental, it consolidated the idea of a national television that reflects culture and the making by its people. A second studio started construction and added several operators and capacitors began.

=== Later history ===
In March 1997, the former radio and television corporations were merged under the current Rádio Televisão de Cabo Verde e Empresas Públicas (RTC-EP). The network was founded in May 1997 by the Minister of Social Communications José António dos Reis. It merged with Radio Nacional de Cabo Verde (RNCV) and Televisião Nacional CaboVerdiana (TNCV). The radio station was named RTC FM and the television channel, RTC.

The network was the first to broadcast elections, the 2001 federal elections, parliamentary and the presidential.

It had broadcast the World Cup games in which is one of the few international games seen, there were no international coverages except for the African sporting events until the 2000s. The network also broadcasts the FIBA World Championship games.

=== Recent history ===
It was the sole broadcasting television station and later the main station until 31 March 2008, when Record Cabo Verde started its broadcast.

A few of its programs are being aired on TV CPLP, a television station aired in lusophony countries.

=== Accords and protocols ===
Accords and protocols were made over the years. The first accord was with Radiodifusão Portuguesa in 2001 followed by Cubavisión in 2003 and an Austrian network in 2005 along with Rádio Moçambique. The first protocol was Televisão Pública de Angola, TPA in 2002, followed by French networks TV5 Monde (in Memorandum of Understanding) and CFI in 2006 and TVI, Televisão Independente SA and RTP in 2007, with radio stations including Rádio Atlântico FM (broadcasting related to Cape Verde) in 2006 and Rádio Voz de Ponta d’Água in 2007. One cooperation protocol was with a private university, Jean Piaget University of Cape Verde in 2006.

== Programs ==
Other programs includes sports coverage of some of the clubs of each island, the top clubs including Sporting Clube da Praia, Boavista Praia, Académica da Praia, CS Mindelense, FC Derby, Académica do Sal, Académica do Porto Novo, Académica do Fogo and Sporting Clube do Porto Novo, many of the regional matches are broadcast locally on radio and television. Almost every Cape Verdean Football Championships matches are aired on RCV and TCV, every championship semifinal and final matches, it once did with several national cup finals and super cup matches. Also the basketball games are aired on RCV and TCV, it may have broadcasting volleyball games.

Its main television programs include Tribuna VIP (VIP Tribune) which includes sports highlights.

Each year, the network broadcasts parts of several music festivals including Praia da Gamboa in Santiago in April or May, Baía das Gatas in São Vicente in August and Santa Maria in the island of Sal in September.

=== List of programs ===
- Regiões (Regions)
- Tribuna VIP (VIP Tribune) - sports program

== Coverage ==
With national coverage in open signal, RTC transmits in the city of Praia and other islands of the archipelago. Here are a list of signals that cover in Cape Verde:

Island	Transmitter
Santo Antão	Porto Novo
São Vicente	Monte Verde
São Nicolau	Southeast of Ribeira Brava
Sal	Monte Curral
Boa Vista	near Ponta do Norte
Maio	Monte Lume
Santiago (South)	Palmarejo-Monte Vermelho
Santiago (South)	Monte Tchota
Santiago (North)	Monte Tchota
Fogo - Mosteiro	Monte Tchota (via Santiago transmitter)
Fogo - São Filipe	Congresso
Brava	Nossa Senhora do Monte

== In the filming industry ==
The broadcasting station made a film with Spain's Útopi ASAD Animasur titled Kontinuasom which was released in 2009.

== Presidents ==
- Horácio Moreira Semedo (in 2008)
- José Emanuel Tavares Moreira (current)

== Communications staff ==
- Júlio Rodrigues (director of television)
- Anatólio Lima (director of radio)
- Palo - soundman until 1989 at the radio station

== Employees ==
- Elisângelo Ramos - reporter for RCV radio network since 1996

== See also ==
- List of television stations in Africa
- List of companies in Cape Verde
