= Banco Interatlântico =

Commercial bank in Cape Verde

- Company type: Commercial banking
- Founded: July 1999
- Headquarters: Praia, Santiago, Cape Verde
- Website: www.bi.cv

Banco Interatlântico is a Cape Verdean commercial bank. Its headquarter is at Avenida Cidade de Lisboa in Praia. The bank was established in July 1999 as a subsidiary of the Portuguese Caixa Geral de Depósitos. The CGD Group now owns 70% of Banco Interatlântico.

== See also ==
- List of companies in Cape Verde
- List of banks in Cape Verde
