= Rádio e Televisão Independente =

Proposed television channel in Portugal

Rádio e Televisão Independente, Sociedade Cooperativa de Responsabilidade Limitada (RTI) was the first proposal for a private television channel in Portugal, at a time when only the public sector was allowed to have television channels. It was created in 1978 but the project was shelved by 1980 without even launching.

== History ==
In May 1978, RTI was registered by a group of people politically connected to the Portuguese right and far-right, among them, former RTP president João Tomás Rosa. RTI proposed three solutions to the government: the creation of a third television channel by means of a state license, the exploitation of the entirety of the pre-existing second RTP channel or the intention to deliver its signal on cable television, which did not exist in Portugal at the time. Its staff also showed interest in becoming television producers. RTI presented a 24-page dossier on the outline of the network.

Per a letter written from Vitorino Rosa to then-President Ramalho Eanes on June 15, 1977, proponents determined a schedule running from 6:30pm to 11pm on weekdays (starting at 2pm on weekends). The international news segment (o que aconteceu hoje) was limited to a reading of news headlines from newspapers.

RTI's staff criticized RTP for being a "Salazarist-Caetanist-Gonçalvist-Soarist television monopoly". One of its mentors, Tomás Rosa, which was one of RTP's first post-Carnation presidents, left his post at the state broadcaster on March 1, 1977 due to alleged censorship on Telejornal after being responsible for a signing of a document together with 22 journalists. RTI was structured as a co-operative due to article 38, number 6 of the media law strictly forbidding private companies from owning television channels.

== Aftermath ==
In 1979, RTI was dissolved thanks to the approval of a new Television Law on November 29 that year (Law nº.75/79), which defined television as a "public service of the Portuguese people" and that "the public television service cannot be objected to private property". The law suggested that a special concession was given to the public, private and co-operative sectors merely for the exploitation of television programs.

New private television stations other than RTI were suggested starting in 1980 with the granting of a television channel owned by the Patriarchy of Lisbon with coverage limited to the Greater Lisbon area. The idea was more feasible than a national channel because of cost issues, but caused a scandal at the Church.

Private television only started in 1992 with Sociedade Independente de Comunicação in October 1992, followed by Televisão Independente in February 1993.
