= Correios de Cabo Verde =

National postal service company of Cape Verde

Coordinates: 14.9172°N 23.5075°W

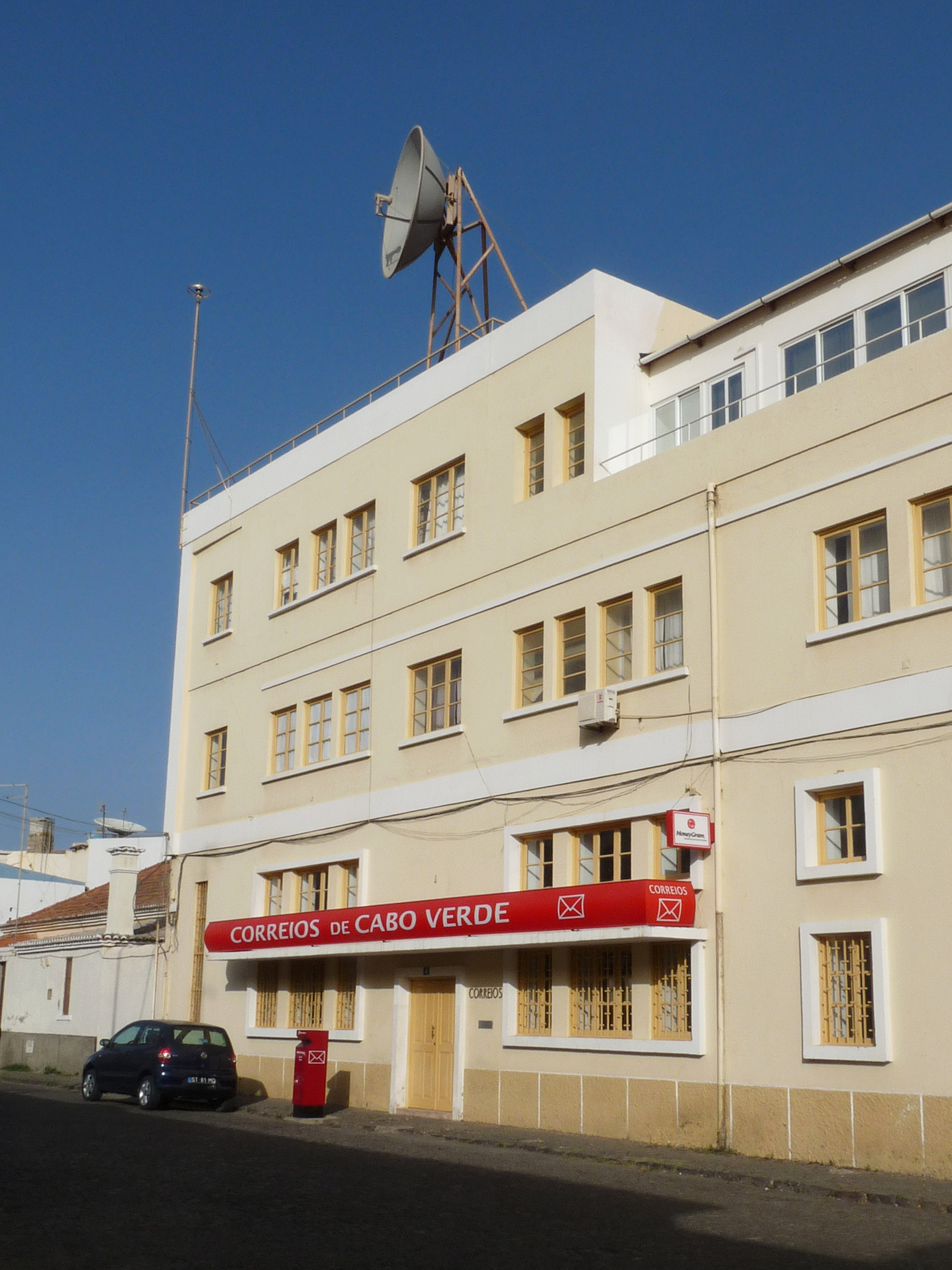
- Headquarters of Correios de Cabo Verde (Post of Cape Verde or Cape Verde Post)
- Type: SARL
- Industry: Logistics
- Founded: 1 January 1995
- Headquarters: Rua Cesário de Lacerda 2, 7600 Praia, Cape Verde
- Website: www.correios.cv

Correios de Cabo Verde (Portuguese pronunciation: [kuˈʁɐjuʒ ðɨ ˈkabu ˈveɾdɨ], lit. 'Post of Cape Verde', abbr. CCV) is the company responsible for postal service in Cape Verde. The headquarters of the company are in the city centre of Praia, at Rua Cesário Lacerda, nº 2.

== History ==
During Portuguese rule in Cape Verde which lasted until 1975, all postal services were done by Correios de Portugal (Portuguese Post). Its first post office was opened in Praia in 1849. Under law no. 9-A/95 made on 16 February 1995, the public company of posts and telecommunications (Empresa Pública dos Correios e Telecomunicaçöes, (CTT-EP) was split into two: Correios de Cabo Verde (postal service) and Cabo Verde Telecom (telecommunications). Both became anonymous societies with limited responsibility.

== Street names and numbers ==
More than 90% of Cape Verdean roads do not have names. As such, most people use community post boxes. To enable delivery at home, the Open Location Code system invented by Google has officially been adopted by the Cape Verdean post, including a system on their website to officially link their home location with personal data at the post office.

== See also ==
- List of postal codes in Cape Verde
