= Alou (telecommunications company) =

Cape Verdean telecommunication company

- Industry: Telecommunications
- Founded: 16 February 1995
- Headquarters: Praia, Cape Verde
- Products: Telecommunications services Internet services
- Number of employees: 400
- Website: www.alou.cv

Alou, formerly known as Cabo Verde Telecom (or CV Telecom) is a telecommunications and Internet service provider of Cape Verde. It was established in 1995.

== History ==
CVT was created from the separation of the existing Posts, Telephones and Telegraphs company of Cape Verde into two separate companies, one for postal services (Correios de Cabo Verde) and one for telecommunications (Cabo Verde Telecom) on 16 February 1995. The state alienated 40% in December 1999 to Portugal Telecom Internacional, becoming a shareholder on 29 March 2000, following an intergovernmental agreement between the two countries.

In 2006, CVTelecom launched its IPTV service, ZAP, with a €2.8 million investment, launching with 21 channels. On 13 March 2009, Benfica TV was added to its offer. Interest in the channel was keen, due to the high number of SL Benfica supporters in the country.

CVT was affected by a judicial decision that affected Portugal Telecom and its subsequent sale to Altice. By March 2015, it was awaiting a decision from the courts. Until 2019, the company was owned by the Brazilian company Oi, which had acquired most of PT's international assets, but sold it in 2019 for €23.5 million (US$26,3 million), ending its litigation. Since then, all of its shares have been owned by Cape Verdeans, 82% in the public sector and the remaining 18% by private shareholders.

On 3 November 2022, CVTelecom announced the merger of all of its assets (CV Multimédia (ZAP) and CV Móvel would be integrated into CV Telecom). No staff was set to be fired because of the merger. The new commercial brand, Alou, launched on 3 October 2023.
