= Rony Cruz =

Cape Verdean footballer (born 1995)

Personal information
- Full name: Ronivaldo Delgado Cruz
- Date of birth: 1 January 1995 (age 31)
- Place of birth: Cape Verde
- Height: 1.89 m (6 ft 2 1/2 in)
- Position: Centre back

Youth career
- 2012–2013: Benfica
- 2013–2014: Oeiras

Senior career*
Years	Team	Apps	(Gls)
2014	Oeiras	2	(0)
2014–2015	Atlético Reguengos	31	(1)
2015–2017	Farense	43	(1)
2017	Arandina	0	(0)
- * Club domestic league appearances and goals as of 26 November 2017

Ronivaldo "Rony" Delgado Cruz (born 1 January 1995) is a Cape Verdean professional footballer who last played for Spanish club Arandina CF as a defender.

== Football career ==
On 12 September 2015, Cruz made his professional debut with Farense in a 2015–16 LigaPro match against Sporting Covilhã.
