= Televisão de Cabo Verde =

- Country: Cape Verde
- Broadcast area: Cape Verde

Programming
- Language: Portuguese
- Picture format: 16:9; HDTV

Ownership
- Owner: Rádiotelevisão Caboverdiana

History
- Launched: 12 March 1984; 42 years ago

Televisão de Cabo Verde is the oldest television channel in Cape Verde, owned by public company RTC. TCV airs local and international programming; since 2013, its local output became available abroad on TCV Internacional.

== History ==
=== Early experiments ===
Long before the first regular television broadcasts started in Cape Verde, the first attempts at bringing television came at the mercy of Chibeto Faria, a bank manager, who lived in the island of São Vicente. Since Cape Verde had no television station at the time, the closest television stations were from the Canary Islands (RTVE Canarias, broadcasts started in 1964) and Senegal (ORTS, broadcasts started in 1965, regularized in 1972). To receive these signals, Chibeto had to transport his television set by donkey to Monte Verde (approximately 5 kilometers). The television viewers at the time preferred feature films and football matches.

With a growing number of viewers and followers of Chibeto, he decided to look for assistance from technicians to study the feasibility of a television service covering Mindelo with assistance from a French technician. With no money to start work, he started a fundraising campaign to set up the service. This also included the installation of a television transmitter at Monte Verde. Few households had a television set.

Shortly afterwards, in 1975, Hilário Brito, executive director of Cabo Verde Telecom, decided to implement a plan for the introduction of a television service in Praia, the national capital, with the aim of improving the newly independent country's communication infrastructure. The television transmitter at Monte Tchota was his first experience in telecommunications. In his first attempts, he received television signals from the Canary Islands. Like what happened before in Mindelo, the experiences in Monte Tchota had triggered the same effect: potential viewers went there on purpose to watch television. Locals later bought their television sets, with Hilário beginning a process to distribute the signals between Mount Tchota and Praia. Viewers were enticed by the programs coming out of the TVE station in the Canary Islands, but the schedule wasn't fixed, depending on the condition of the reception. Hilário's television station, dubbed "TV Hilário", started producing some content of its own, mixed with pirated content. His television station had no license and the international content was in violation of international property rights.

=== TEVEC ===
In the early 80s, RTP signed a protocol with the Cape Verdean government to supply equipment and trained staff for TEVEC, with its launch scheduled for 1983. Corsino Flores set up the project for the television service, beginning investments in equipment and obtaining staff. Studies were being made for the installation of television transmitters in three islands, Sal, São Vicente and Santiago. The national television corporation was given the name Televisão Experimental de Cabo Verde or TEVEC, it started on 12 March 1984, nearly nine years after independence and started operating its regular service on 31 December 1984. It had 22 professionals and broadcast three days a week for several hours.

Over the years, TEVEC grew and increased its frequencies and transmissions. In its early years, the station broadcast four hours a day, from 8pm to midnight, using the SECAM-DK system.

Some years before the foundation, poet Corsino Fortes, then Deputy Secretary to the Prime Minister and titular Minister of Social Communications, inspired a television model of Iceland in which television stations existed and operated in small cities and proved the experimental mode for the country's model. The station worked in its early years with highs and lows. Transmission breakdowns, however, were frequent.

=== TNCV ===
On 1 June 1990 (June 23, according to some sources), the name TNCV (Televisão Nacional CaboVerdiana) marked a new era in Capeverdean television and no longer became experimental, it consolidated the idea of a national television that reflects culture and the making by its people. A second studio started construction and added several operators and capacitors began.

=== RTC and TCV ===
In March 1997, the former radio and television corporations were merged under the current Rádio Televisão de Cabo Verde e Empresas Públicas (RTC-EP). The network was founded in May 1997 by the Minister of Social Communications José António dos Reis. It merged with Radio Nacional de Cabo Verde (RNCV) and Televisião Nacional CaboVerdiana (TNCV). The radio station was named RTC FM and the television channel, RTC. The current name for the channel was adopted in 1999.

The network was the first to broadcast elections, the 2001 federal elections, parliamentary and the presidential.

It had broadcast the World Cup games in which is one of the few international games seen, there were no international coverages except for the African sporting events until the 2000s. The network also broadcasts the FIBA World Championship games.

Excluding RTP África, it was the only local television channel in Cape Verde until the launch of TIVER and Record Cabo Verde in 2007.

On 13 May 2009, marking its 25th anniversary, TCV doubled its daily airtime from six hours to twelve. The goal was largely to increase local productions and reduce the dependence on Brazilian telenovelas and Portuguese football matches. A news bulletin at 1pm was added, joining the existing 8pm and 11pm bulletins.

Work was underway in July 2010 on a €1 million project to digitize TCV's equipment to improve its productions, the quality of its signal and expand from a twelve-hour schedule to 24 hours. The plan oversaw the creation of a new studio using improved technologies.

On 20 October 2022, RTC announced a nearly €1 million project to convert the channel to high definition, to be installed by Portuguese company Pantalha and due for the first quarter of 2023.
