= Bank of Cape Verde =

Monetary Authority of Cape Verde

Bank of Cape Verde Banco de Cabo Verde

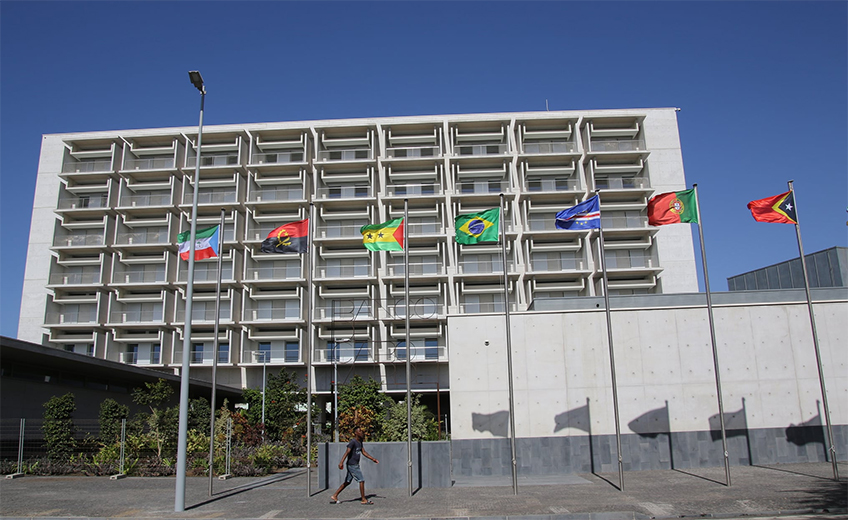
- Central bank of: Cape Verde
- Headquarters: Av. Amílcar Cabral, Praia, Cape Verde
- Coordinates: 14.9188°N 23.5091°W
- Established: 29 September 1975
- Ownership: 100% state ownership
- Governor: Óscar Humberto Évora Santos
- Currency: Cape Verdean escudo CVE (ISO 4217)
- Reserves: 490 million USD
- Website: www.bcv.cv

The Bank of Cape Verde (Portuguese: Banco de Cabo Verde) is Cape Verde's central bank. Its headquarter is located on Avenida Amílcar Cabral, in the national capital of Praia on the island of Santiago. Its current governor is João António Pinto Coelho Serra, who is in office since December 2014.

== Governors ==
- Corentino Santos, 1975-1984
- Amaro da Luz, 1984-1991
- Oswaldo Sequeira, 1991-1999
- Olavo Correia, 1999-2004
- Carlos Burgo, 2004-2014
- João Serra, 2014-2020
- Óscar Humberto Évora Santos, 2021 -

== History ==
The government established the Bank of Cape Verde in 1975, as a bank that combined commercial banking and central banking functions. The government created the bank by nationalizing the operations of the Portuguese colonial and overseas bank, Banco Nacional Ultramarino, which had established its first branch in Cape Verde in 1865. In 1993, the government split off the commercial banking functions into the newly established Banco Comercial do Atlântico.

== See also ==
- Economy of Cape Verde
- List of central banks
- List of financial supervisory authorities by country
