= Record Cabo Verde =

Television channel in Cape Verde

- Company type: Private
- Industry: Television
- Founded: 31 March 2007
- Headquarters: Praia, Cape Verde
- Key people: Luiz Claudio Costa (president)
- Owner: Grupo Record
- Website: recordcaboverde.com

Record Cabo Verde is a channel of Record in Cape Verde. It is the first Brazilian based channel to have its own version in Cape Verde. The network was launched on 31 March 2007.

The channel was created as part of a government project to end the local terrestrial television monopoly in Cape Verde (excluding RTP África) in January 2007. The station was the highest-ranked of the three national bids, receiving a 70% rate, ahead of TIVER (57%) and RTI (54%).

Its station is in the west of the city in the northern part of Cidadela in Praia and located off the road linking with Ribeira Grande and Porto Mosquito and the Circular Road. Nearly a kilometer west is the Jean Piaget University of Cape Verde.

The network may have now recently broadcasting sports programs from Cape Verde apart from football (soccer).

The network first broadcast the 2011 federal elections, the parliamentary and the presidential.

== Programming ==
- Balanço Geral
- CV no Ar
- Eco Musical
- Ponto de Vista (Point of View)
- Fala Cabo Verde
- Record Shopping
- Tudo a Ver (ALl for To)
- Contacto Directo (Direct Contact, also known as Contato Direito)
- Pikinotes Sabe Tcheu

=== Fala Cabo Verde ===
Its own version equivalent to Fala Brasil is titled Fala Cabo Verde. The Capeverdean version of the news program is the main news broadcast. It is aired Weeknights (Monday to Friday) at 19h30. It is reported by Silvana Gomes and coordinated by Elisabete Dias.

=== Eco Musical ===
Edneia Barros presents the daily format of the Cape Verdean version of Eco Musical. It shows exclusive interviews of main celebrities in Capeverdean Music and highlights of what happens in showbiz.

The songs are aired on Eco Top with the best music videos which is part of the multicultural program.

== Coverage ==
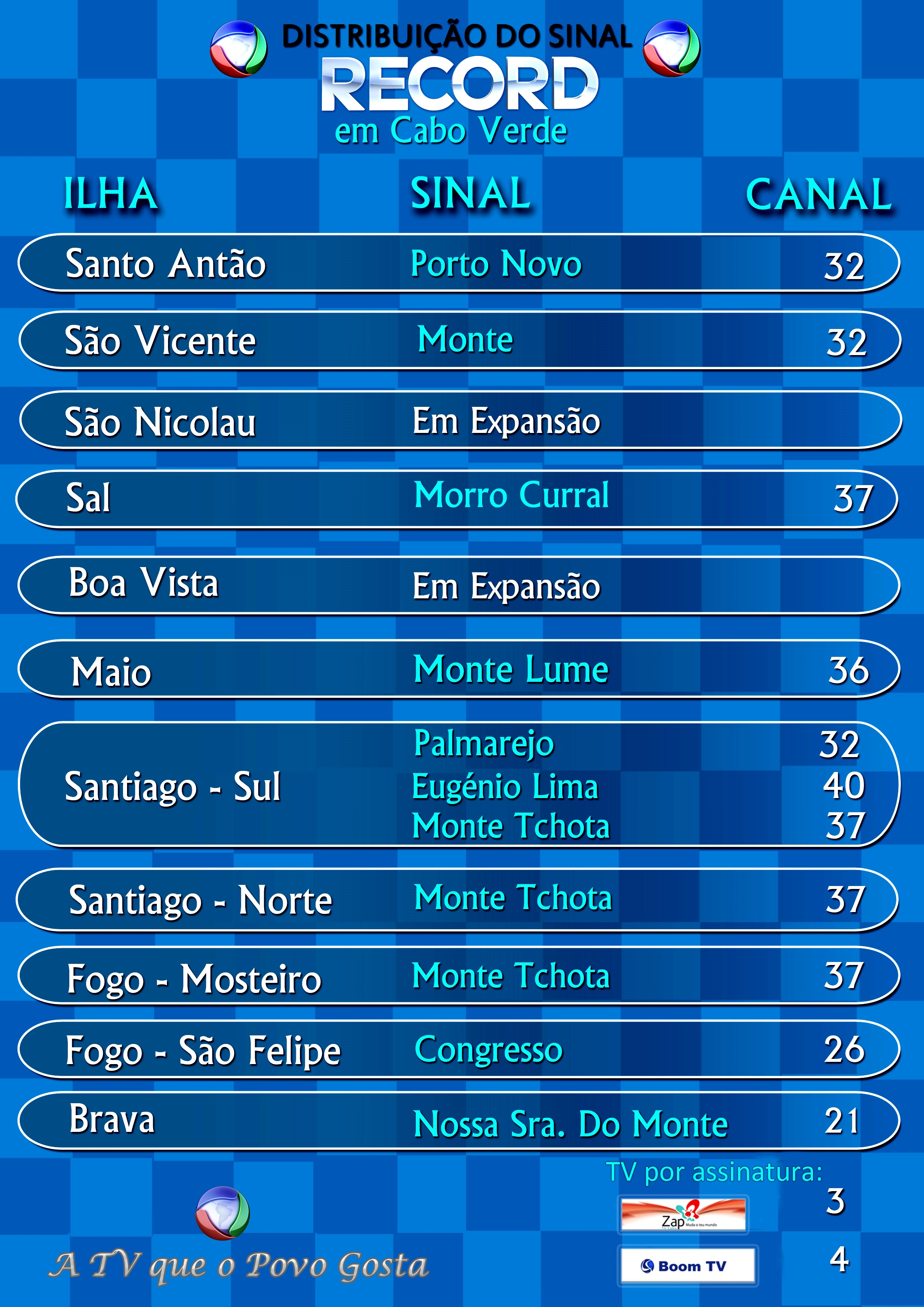
Record CV's open signals in the early 2010s

With national coverage in open signal, Record TV Cabo Verde transmits in the city of Praia and other islands of the archipelago. It serves up to 89% of the population and about 75–80% of the area of the nation. Signals goes as far into the ocean up to around 50 km distant as it is heard on several ferry boats, but not merchant ships. Here are a list of signals that currently cover in Cape Verde:

Up to 2014, analogue signals into Santo Antão were aired from Mindelo on channel 32. Sal had a single analogue signal. From Monte Verde's towers, Santa Luzia, the islets of Raso and Branco and the shoreline areas of São Nicolau receives transmitters to the areas, the east of São Nicolau receives its signals from Monte Curral near Espargos as the island has a transmitter but does not broadcasts Record Cabo Verde. West Fogo's analog signal spreads into northeast Brava and the northern islets. The rest of the island has its own signal at Nossa Senhora do Monte, first at channel 21, changed to channel 24.

Boa Vista remains an island without its own signal, its broadcasts are from nearby Santa Maria. Tarrafal de Monte Trigo has no signals received there, Topo da Coroa has no single transmitter located in the vicinity. While due to its high elevation, Chã das Caldeiras and area does not receive signals.

Recently digital signals has been put which is on channel 2, currently airing in the islands of São Vicente, Sal and Santiago. Record Cabo Verde and other Capeverdean channels may have a plan that will have all their signals in digital format as to many other countries including Europe, Asia, the Americas and most of Australasia.

A likely probability is that Record Cabo Verde is now available on satellite television.

Until the shutdown of analog terrestrial television in 2021, this was Record Cabo Verde's transmitter network:

Island	Tramsmitter	Channel
Santo Antão	Porto Novo	24
Santo Antão	Paul (Note: located not at Pico da Cruz)	41
Santo Antão	Ponta do Sol	7
São Vicente	Monte Verde	32
São Nicolau	Southeast of Ribeira Brava	
Sal	Espargos-Monte Curral	37
Sal	Santa Maria	50
Boa Vista	Southern Sal (via Sal transmitter)	50
Maio	Cidade do Maio-Monte Lume	36
Santiago (South)	Praia – Palmarejo/Monte Vermelho/Cidadela	32
Santiago (South)	Praia – Eugénio Lima/Paiol/Fazenda	40
Santiago (South)	Monte Tchota	37
Santiago (North)	Monte Tchota	37
Fogo – Mosteiro	Monte Tchota (via Santiago transmitter)	37
Fogo – São Filipe	Congresso	26
Brava	Furna (via São Filipe, Fogo transmitter)	26
Brava	Nossa Senhora do Monte	21
