= List of governors of dependent territories in the 16th century =

This is a list of territorial governors in the 16th century (1501–1600) AD, such as the administrators of colonies, protectorates, or other dependencies. Where applicable, native rulers are also listed.

A dependent territory is normally a territory that does not possess full political independence or sovereignty as a sovereign state yet remains politically outside of the controlling state's integral area. The administrators of uninhabited territories are excluded.

== England ==
Kingdom of England
English overseas possessions
- Monarchs

British Isles

- Guernsey, Crown dependency

- British monarchs are the Dukes of Normandy
- Governors

- Edward Weston, Governor (1486–1509)
- Richard Weston, Governor (1509–1541)
- Francis Weston, co-Governor (1533–1536)
- Richard Long, Governor (1541–1545)
- Peter Mewtis, Governor (1545–1553)
- Leonard Chamberlain, Governor (1553–1561)
- Francis Chamberlain, Governor (1561–1570)
- Thomas Leighton, Governor (1570–1609)

- Bailiffs

- John Martin, Bailiff (1499–1510)
- James Guille, Bailiff (1511–1537)
- Thomas Compton, Bailiff (1538–1544)
- John Haryvell, Bailiff (1545–1549)
- Hellier Gosselin, Bailiff (1549–1562)
- Thomas Compton, Bailiff (1562–1570)
- Guillaume de Beauvoir, Bailiff (1571–1581)
- Thomas Wigmore, Bailiff (1581–1588)
- Louis de Vic, Bailiff (1588–1600)

- Lordship of Ireland, a papal fief of England

- English monarchs are the Lords of Ireland
- Lord Deputy of Ireland

- Gerald FitzGerald, 8th Earl of Kildare (1496–1513)
- Gerald FitzGerald, 9th Earl of Kildare (1513–1518)
- Sir Maurice Fitzgerald
- Thomas Howard, Earl of Surrey (1520–1522)
- Piers Butler, 8th Earl of Ormonde (1522–1524)
- Gerald FitzGerald, 9th Earl of Kildare (1524–1529)
- Sir William Skeffington (1529–1532)
- Gerald FitzGerald, 9th Earl of Kildare (1532–1534)
- Sir William Skeffington (1534–1535)
- Leonard Grey, 1st Viscount Grane (1536–1540)

- Kingdom of Ireland, effectively a client state of England

- English monarchs are the Monarchs of Ireland
- Lord Deputy of Ireland

- Anthony St Leger (1540–1548)
- Edward Bellingham (1548–1549)
- Lord Justices (1549–1550)
- Anthony St Leger (1550–1551)
- James Croft (1551–1552)
- Lord Justices (1552–1553)
- Anthony St Leger (1553–1556)
- Thomas Radclyffe, 3rd Earl of Sussex (1556–1558) (Lord Lieutenant 1560–1564)
- Sir Nicholas Arnold(1564–1565)
- Sir Henry Sidney (1565–1571) (1575–1578)
- William FitzWilliam (1571–1575) (1588–1594)
- Arthur Grey, 14th Baron Grey de Wilton (1580–1582)
- Sir John Perrot (1584–1588)
- William Russell, 1st Baron Russell of Thornhaugh (1594–1597)
- Thomas Burgh, 7th Baron Strabolgi (1597)
- Robert Devereux, 2nd Earl of Essex (Lord Lieutenant of Ireland 1599)

North America

- Roanoke Colony

- Governors

- Walter Raleigh, Lord and Governor (1585–c.1590)

- Ralph Lane, Acting Governor (1585–1586)
- John White, Acting Governor (1587)

== France ==
Ancien Régime of France
French colonial empire
- Heads of state

North America

- New France

- Lieutenant generals

- Jean-François Roberval, Lieutenant general (1541–1543)
- vacant (1543–1598)
- Marquis de la Roche-Mesgouez, Lieutenant general (1598–1603)

== Portugal ==
Kingdom of Portugal
Portuguese colonial empire
Monarchs

=== Africa ===
- Portuguese Angola

- Governors

- Paulo Dias de Novais, Donatario (1575–1589)
- Luís Serrão, Governor (1589–1591)
- André Ferreira Pereira, Governor (1591–1592)
- Francisco de Almeida, Governor (1592–1593)
- Jerónimo de Almeida, Governor (1593–1594)
- João Furtado de Mendonça, Governor (1594–1602)

- Portuguese Cape Verde

- Santiago

- Rodrigo Afonso, Captains (1473–1505)

- Ribeira Grande

- Captains

- Sebastião Álvares de Landim, Captain (1508–?)
- Fernão Mendes, Captain (1515–c.1516)
- João Alemão, Captain (1517–?)
- João Correia de Souza, Captain (1536–?)
- António Correia de Souza, Captain (1544–?)
- Manuel de Andrade, Captain (1555–?)
- Constantino de Bragança, Captain (1562–?)

- Boa Vista

- Captains

- Rodrigo Afonso, Captain (1497–1505)
- Pêro Correia, Captain (1505–?)
- António Correia, Captain (?–1542)
- Maria Correia, Captain (1542–?)

- Alcatrazes Islands

- Captains

- Afonso Ribeiro, Captain (1504–?)
- Rodrigi Varela, Captain (1508–?)

- Praia

- Captains

- André Rodrigues dos Mosquitos, Captain (1526–1527)
- Gomes Balieiro, Captain (1527–?)
- Manuel Correia, Captain (1570–?)

- Fogo

- Captains

- João de Meneses Vasconcellos, conde de Penela, Captain (1528–1529)
- Afonso de Meneses, conde de Penela, Captain (1528–?)

- Sal, Santa Luzia and Brava

- Captains

- Luís Pereira, Captain (1542–?)
- Martinho Pereira, Captain (1553–?)

- Santo Antão

- Gonçalo de Sousa, Captains (1548–?)

- Governors of Cape Verde

- Pêro de Guimarães, Corregedor (?–1517)
- João Alemão, Corregedor (1517–1521)
- Leonis Correia, Corregedor (1521–1527)
- Gaspar Correia, Corregedor (1527–1534)
- Estêvão de Lagos, Corregedor (1534–1536)
- André Feio, Corregedor (1536–1541)
- Simão Afonso, Corregedor (1539–1541)
- Pêro Moniz, Corregedor (1541–1544)
- António Ferreira, Corregedor (1544–1547)
- Pêro de Araujo, Corregedor (1547–1550)
- Jorge Pimentel, Corregedor (1550–1556)
- Manuel de Andrade, Corregedor (1556–1559)
- Luís Martins de Evangelho, Corregedor (1559–1560)
- Gregório Martins Caminha, Corregedor (1560–1562)
- Bernardo de Alpoim, Corregedor (1562–1571)
- António Velho Tinoco, Corregedor (1571–1577)
- Cristóvão Soares de Mello, Corregedor (1577–1579)
- Diogo Dias Magro, Corregedor (1579–1584)
- Gaspar de Andrade, Corregedor (1584–1588)
- Amador Gomes Raposo, Corregedor (1588–1588)
- Duarte Lobo da Gama, Governor (1588–1591)
- Brás Soares de Melo, Governor (1591–1595)
- Francisco Lobo da Gama, Governor (1597–1603)

- Portuguese São Tomé

- Captains, Governors

- Fernão de Melo, Captain (1499–c.1510)
- unspecified (c.1510–c.1516)
- Diogo de Alcáçova, Captain (c.1516–c.1517)
- João de Melo, Captain (c.1517–1522)
- Vasco Estevens, Captain (1522–?)
- unspecified (?–1531)
- Henrique Pereira, Captain (1531–c.1535)
- unspecified (c.1535–1541)
- Diogo Botelho Pereira, Captain (1541–1545)
- Francisco de Barros de Paiva, Captain (1546–c.1554)
- Pedro Botelho, Captain (c.1558–?)
- unspecified (?–1560)
- Cristóvão Dória de Sousa, Captain (1560–1564)
- Francisco de Gouveia, Captain (1564–1569)
- Francisco de Pavia Teles, Captain (1569–1571)
- Diogo Salema, Captain (1571–1575)
- António Monteiro Maciel, Captain (1575–c.1582)
- unspecified (c.1582–c.1584)
- Francisco Fernandes de Figueiredo, Captain (c.1584–1586), Governor (1586–1587)
- Miguel Teles de Moura, Governor (1587–1591)
- Duarte Peixoto da Silva, Governor (1591–1592)
- Francisco de Vila Nova, Acting Governor (1592–1593)
- Fernandes de Meneses, Governor (1593–1597)
- Vasco de Carvalho, Governor (1597–c.1598)
- João Barbosa da Cunha, Acting Governor (c.1598–1601)

- Portuguese Moçambique

- Captains major, Captains general

- Captaincy of Sofala under Viceroy of India

- Sancho de Tovar, Captain major (1501–1505)
- Pêro de Anaia, Captain major (1505–1506)
- Manuel Fernandes de Meireles, Acting Captain major (1506)
- Nuno Vaz Pereira, Captain major (1506–1507)

- Captaincy of Sofala and Moçambique under Viceroy of India

- Vasco Gomes de Abreu, Captain major (1507–1508)
- Rui de Brito Patalim, Acting Captain major (1508–1509)
- António de Saldanha, Captain major (1509–1512)
- Simão de Miranda de Azevedo, Captain major (1512–1515)
- Sancho de Tovar, Acting Captain major (1512–1515)
- Cristóvão de Távora, Captain major (1515–1518)
- Sancho de Tovar, Captain major (1518–1521)
- Diogo de Sepúlveda, Captain major (1521–1525)
- Lopo de Almeida, Captain major (1525–1528)
- António da Silveira de Meneses, Captain major (1528–1531)
- Vicente Pegado, Captain major (1531–1538)
- Alexio Chicorro, Captain major (1538–1541)
- João de Sepúlveda, Captain major (1541–1548)
- Fernão de Sousa de Távora, Captain major (1548–1551)
- Diogo de Mesquita, Captain major (1551–1553)
- Diogo de Sousa, Captain major (1553–1557)
- Sebastião de Sá, Captain major (1557–1560)
- Pantaleão de Sá, Captain major (1560–1564)
- Jerónimo Barreto, Captain major (1564–1567)
- Pedro Barreto Rolim, Captain major (1567–1569)

- Captaincy-general of Moçambique

- Francisco Barreto, Captain general (1569–1573)
- Vasco Fernandes Homem, Acting Captain general (1573–1577)
- Fernando Monroi, Acting Captain general (1577)
- Simão de Silveira, Acting Captain general (1577)
- Pedro de Castro, Captain general (1577–1582)
- Nuno Pereira, Captain general (1582–1586)
- Jorge Telo de Meneses, Captain general (1586–1589)
- Lourenço de Brito, Captain general (1589–1590)
- Pedro de Sousa, Captain general (1590–1595)
- Nuno da Cunha Ataíde, Captain general (1595–1598)
- Álvaro Abranches, Captain general (1598–1601)

- Portuguese Tangier

- Governors

- Lopo Vaz de Azevedo, Governor (1490?–1501)
- João de Meneses, Governor (1501–1508)
- Duarte de Meneses, Governor (1508–1521)
- Henrique de Meneses, Governor (1521–1522)
- Duarte de Meneses, from Évora, Governor (1522–1533)
- Gonçalo Mendes Sacoto, Governor (1533–1536)
- Duarte de Meneses, Governor (1536–1539)
- João de Meneses, Governor (1539–1546)
- Francisco Botelho, Governor (1546–1548)
- Pedro de Meneses, Governor (1548–1550)
- João Álvares de Azevedo, Governor (1550–1552)
- Luís de Loureiro, Governor (1552–1553)
- Fernando de Menezes, Governor (1553)
- Luís da Silva de Meneses, Governor (1553–1554)
- Bernardim de Carvalho, Governor (1554–1564)
- Lourenço de Távora, Governor (1564–1566)
- João de Meneses, Governor (1566–1572)
- Rui de Carvalho, Governor (1572–1573)
- Diogo Lopes da Franca, Governor (1573–1574)
- António of Portugal, Governor (1574)
- Duarte de Meneses, Viceroy of Portuguese India, Governor (1574–1578)
- Pedro da Silva, Governor (1578)
- Jorge de Mendonça, Governor (1578–1581)
- Francisco de Almeida, Governor (1581–1590)
- Belchior da França, Simão Lopes de Mendonça, Governor (1590–1591)
- Aires de Saldanha, Governor (1591–1599)
- António Pereira Lopes de Berredo, Governor (1599–1605)

=== Asia ===
- Portuguese India

=== South America ===
- Colonial Brazil

- Governors general

- Tomé de Sousa, Governor general (1549–1553)
- Duarte da Costa, Governor general (1553-1558)
- Mem de Sá, Governor general (1558-1572)
- Luís de Brito de Almeida, Governor general (1573-1578, Bahia)
- Cristóvão de Barros, Governor general (1572-1574, Rio de Janeiro)
- Lourenço da Veiga, Governor general (1578-1581)
- António Barreiros, Interim Governor general (1581-1583)
- Manuel Teles Barreto, Governor general (1583-1587)
- António Barreiros, Interim Governor general (1587-1591)
- D. Francisco de Sousa, Governor general (1591-1602)

== Spain ==
Habsburg Spain
Spanish colonial empire
Monarchs

=== Caribbean ===
- Colony of Santiago

- Governors

- Juan de Esquivel, Governor (1510–1514)
- Francisco de Garay, Governor (1514–1523)
- Pedro de Mazuelo, Governor (1523–1526)
- Juan de Mendegurren, Governor (1526–1527)
- Santino de Raza, Governor (1527–1531)
- Gonzalo de Guzman, Governor (?–1532)
- Manuel de Rojas, Governor (1532–?)
- Gil González Dávila, Governor (1533?–1534?)
- Manuel de Rojas, Governor (1536–?)
- Pedro Cano, Governor (1539?)
- Francisco de Pina, Governor (1544?)
- Juan González de Hinojosa, Governor (1556?)
- Pedro Cano, Governor (1558?)
- Blas de Melo, Governor (1565?)
- Juan de Gaudiel, Governor (1567?–1572?)
- Hernán Manrique de Rojas, Governor (1575?)
- Iñigo Fuentes, Governor (?–1577)
- Rodrigo Núñez de la Peña, Governor (1577–1578)
- Lucas del Valle Alvarado, Governor (1578–1583?)
- Diego Fernández de Mercado, Governor (1586?)
- Lucas del Valle Alvarado, Governor (1591?)
- García del Valle, Governor (1596?)
- Fernando Melgarejo Córdoba, Governor (1596–1606)

=== Europe ===
- Spanish Netherlands

- Governors

- Engelbert II of Nassau, Governor (1501-1504)
- William de Croÿ, Governor (1504-1507)
- Margaret of Austria, Governor (1507-1530)
- Mary of Austria, Governor (1531-1555)
- Emmanuel Philibert of Savoy, Governor (1555-1559)
- Margaret of Parma, Governor (1559-1567)
- Fernando Álvarez de Toledo, Governor (1567-1573)
- Luis de Requesens y Zúñiga, Governor (1573-1576)
- John of Austria, Governor (1576-1578)
- Alexander Farnese, Governor (1578-1592)
- Peter Ernst I von Mansfeld-Vorderort, Governor (1592-1594)
- Ernest of Austria, Governor (1594-1595)
- Pedro Henriquez de Acevedo, Governor (1595-1596)
- Albert of Austria, Governor (1596-1598)

=== North America ===
- Azcapotzalco part of the Triple Alliance of the Aztec Empire (1428-1521)
  1. Don Carlos Oquiztzin, Tlatoani (English: "Ruler" or "King") (1499-1520?)
- Cuauhnahuac dependency of Aztec Empire (1403=1520)
  - Tehuehuetzin, Tlatoani (ruler or governor) (before 1491–1504)
  - Itzohuatzin (or Yoatzin), Tlatoani (?-1520)
- Ecatepec
  - Part of the Triple Alliance of the Aztec Empire (1428-1521)

- Chimalpilli II, 4th Tlatoani (1498-1520)

  - Dependency of New Spain (1521-1547)

- Diego de Alvarado Huanitzin, 5th Tlatoani (1520–1539)
1. Don Diego Quauhpotonqui, 6th Tlatoani (1539-1547)

- New Spain complete list —
- Governor of the West Indies

- Diego Velázquez de Cuéllar, governor-general of Cuba (1518–1524)

- Governors of New Spain

- Hernán Cortés, governor and captain-general (1521, 1521–1524, 1526)
- Cristóbal de Tapia, governor (1521)
- Alonso de Estrada, Rodrigo de Albornoz, Alonso de Zuazo, Triumvirate (1524)
- Gonzalo de Salazar, Pedro Almíndez Chirino, Alonso de Zuazo, Triumvirate (1524–1525)
- Gonzalo de Salazar, Pedro Almíndez Chirino, Alonso de Estrada, Rodrigo de Albornoz, Alonso de Zuazo, Triumvirate (1525)
- Gonzalo de Salazar, Pedro Almíndez Chirino, Alonso de Zuazo, Triumvirate (1525)
- Gonzalo de Salazar, Pedro Almíndez Chirino, Triumvirate (1525–1526)
- Alonso de Estrada, Rodrigo de Albornoz, Triumvirate (1526)
- Luis Ponce de León, Triumvirate (1526)
- Marcos de Aguilar, Governor (1526–1527)
- Alonso de Estrada, Gonzalo de Sandoval, Luis de la Torre, Triumvirate (1527)
- Alonso de Estrada, Luis de la Torre, Triumvirate (1527–1528)
- Nuño Beltrán de Guzmán, Juan Ortiz de Matienzo, Diego Delgadillo, Triumvirate (1528–1529)
- Juan Ortiz de Matienzo, Diego Delgadillo, Triumvirate (1529–1531)
- Sebastián Ramírez de Fuenleal, Vasco de Quiroga, Juan de Salmerón, Alonso de Maldonado, Francisco Ceinos, Triumvirate (1531–1535)

- Viceroys

- Antonio de Mendoza, Viceroy (1535–1550)
- Luís de Velasco, Viceroy (1550–1564)
- Gastón de Peralta, Viceroy (1566–1567)
- Alonso Muñoz and Luis Carrillo, Viceroys (1567–1568)
- Martín Enríquez de Almanza, Viceroy (1568–1580)
- Lorenzo Suárez de Mendoza, Viceroy (1580–1583)
- Pedro Moya de Contreras, Viceroy (1584–1585)
- Álvaro Manrique de Zúñiga, Viceroy (1585–1590)
- Luis de Velasco, Viceroy (1590–1595, 1607–1611)
- Gaspar de Zúñiga, Viceroy (1595–1603)

Tenochtitlan (dependency of New Spain)

- Juan Velázquez Tlacotzin, 13th Tlatoani (1525-1526)
- Andrés de Tapia Motelchiuh, 14th Tlatoani (1525–1530)
- Pablo Xochiquentzin, Cuauhtlatoani (Eagle Captain) (1536)
- Diego de Alvarado Huanitzin, 15th Tlatoani of Mexico-Tenochtitlan and 1st governor of San Juan Tenochtitlan (1539–1541)
- Diego de San Francisco Tehuetzquititzin, 16th Tlatoani of Mexico-Tenochtitlan and 2nd governor of San Juan Tenochtitlan (1541-1554)
- Esteban de Guzmán, judge of San Juan Tenochtitlan (1554-1557)
- Cristóbal de Guzmán Cecetzin, 17th Tlatoani of Mexico-Tenochtitlan and 3rd governor of San Juan Tenochtitlan (1557-1562)
- Luis de Santa María Nanacacipactzin, 18th Tlatoani of Mexico-Tenochtitlan and 4th governor of San Juan Tenochtitlan (1563–1565)

=== South America ===
- Governorate of New Castile

- Governors

- Francisco Pizarro, Governor (1528–1541)
- Cristóbal Vaca de Castro, Governor (1541–1544)
- Gonzalo Pizarro, usurper Governor (1544–1548)

- Viceroyalty of Peru

- Viceroys

- Blasco Núñez Vela, Viceroy (1544–1546)
- Pedro de la Gasca, Viceroy (1546–1549)
- Antonio de Mendoza, Viceroy (1550–1551)
- Melchor Bravo de Saravia, Viceroy (1552–1556)
- Andrés Hurtado de Mendoza, Viceroy (1556–1561)
- Diego López de Zúñiga, Viceroy (1561–1564)
- Juan de Saavedra, Viceroy (1564)
- Lope García de Castro, Viceroy (1564–1569)
- Francisco de Toledo, Viceroy (1569-1581)
- Martín Enríquez de Almanza, Viceroy (1581–1583)
- Cristóbal Ramírez de Cartagena, Viceroy (1584)
- Fernando Torres de Portugal y Mesía, Viceroy (1584–1589)
- García Hurtado de Mendoza, Viceroy (1590–1596)
- Luis de Velasco, Viceroy (1596–1604)

== See also ==
- List of state leaders in the 16th century
- List of state leaders in the 16th-century Holy Roman Empire
- List of state leaders in 16th-century South Asia
