= List of governors of dependent territories in the 15th century =

This is a list of territorial governors in the 15th century (1401–1500) AD, such as the administrators of colonies, protectorates, or other dependencies. Where applicable, native rulers are also listed.

A dependent territory is normally a territory that does not possess full political independence or sovereignty as a sovereign state yet remains politically outside of the controlling state's integral area. The administrators of uninhabited territories are excluded.

== England ==
Kingdom of England
English overseas possessions
- Monarchs

- Guernsey, Crown dependency

- British monarchs are the Dukes of Normandy
- Governors

- Edward of Norwich, in appanage, Governor (1415)
- John of Lancaster, Governor (1430)
- Humphrey, Duke of Gloucester, Governor (1435)
- Henry Beauchamp, Governor (1446)
- William Bertram and Nicholas Hault, Governors (1447)
- John Nanfan, Governor (1453)
- Geffrey Wallifly, Governor (1470)
- John Tichefilde, Governor (1482)
- Duarte Brandão, Governor (1482–1485)
- Edward Weston, Governor (1486–1509)
- John Avril, Governor (1488)
- William Weston, Governor

- Bailiffs

- Gervais de Clermont, Bailiff (1387–1411)
- James Cocquerel, Bailiff (1412–1432)
- Thomas de la Court, Bailiff (1433–1445)
- John Henry, Bailiff (1446–1447)
- Guillaume Cartier, Bailiff (1447–1465)
- Thomas de la Court, Bailiff (1466–1469)
- Pierre de Beauvoir, Bailiff (1470–1479)
- Edmund de Cheney, Bailiff (1480–1481)
- Nicholas Fouaschin, Bailiff (1481–1482)
- John Blondel, Bailiff (1483–1498)
- John Martin, Bailiff (1499–1510)

- Lordship of Ireland, a papal fief of England

- English monarchs are the Lords of Ireland
- Lords Deputy of Ireland

- Sir John Stanley: 1399–1402 (second term)
- Thomas of Lancaster, 1st Duke of Clarence: 1402–1405 (aged 13)
- James Butler, 3rd Earl of Ormond: 1405
- Gerald FitzGerald, 5th Earl of Kildare: 1405–1408
- Thomas of Lancaster, 1st Duke of Clarence: 1408–1413
- Sir John Stanley: 1413–1414 (third term)
- Archbishop of Dublin: 1414
- John Talbot, 1st Earl of Shrewsbury: 1414–1421 (first term)
- James Butler, 4th Earl of Ormond: 1419–1421 (first term)
- Edmund Mortimer, 5th Earl of March: 1423–1425
- John Talbot, 1st Earl of Shrewsbury: 1425 (second term)
- James Butler, 4th Earl of Ormond: 1425–1427
- Sir John Grey: 1427–1428
- John Sutton, later 1st Lord Dudley: 1428–1429
- Sir Thomas le Strange: 1429–1431
- Thomas Stanley, 1st Baron Stanley: 1431–1436
- Lionel de Welles, 6th Baron Welles: 1438–1446
- John Talbot, 1st Earl of Shrewsbury: 1446 (third term)
- Richard Plantagenet, Duke of York: 1447–1460 (Lord Deputy:Thomas FitzGerald, 7th Earl of Kildare)
- George Plantagenet, Duke of Clarence: 1462–1478 (Lords Deputy:Thomas FitzGerald, 7th Earl of Desmond/Thomas FitzGerald, 7th Earl of Kildare)
- John de la Pole, 2nd Duke of Suffolk: 1478
- Richard of Shrewsbury, Duke of York: 1478–1483 (aged 5. Lord Deputy:Gerald FitzGerald, 8th Earl of Kildare)
- Edward of Middleham: 1483–1484 (aged 11. Lord Deputy:Gerald FitzGerald, 8th Earl of Kildare)
- John de la Pole, Earl of Lincoln: 1484–1485
- Jasper Tudor, 1st Duke of Bedford| 1485–1494 (Lord Deputy:Gerald FitzGerald, 8th Earl of Kildare)
- Henry, Duke of York: 1494–?1519 (Aged 4. Lords Deputy: Sir Edward Poynings/Gerald FitzGerald, 8th Earl of Kildare/Gerald FitzGerald, 9th Earl of Kildare)

== Portugal ==
Kingdom of Portugal
Portuguese colonial empire
Monarchs

- Portuguese Cape Verde

- Pêro Lourenço, Corregedor (1481–?)

- Santiago

- Captains

- Diogo Afonso, Captain (1462–1473)
- Rodrigo Afonso, Captain (1473–1505)

- Ribeira Grande

- Captains

- Antonio de Noli, Captain (1462–1496)
- Branca de Aguiar, Captain (1497–?)

- Boa Vista

- Rodrigo Afonso, Captain (1497–1505)

- Alcatrazes Islands

- João de Santarém, Captain (1484–?)

- Portuguese São Tomé

- Captains, Governors

- João de Paiva, Captain (1485–1490)
- João Pereira, Captain (1490–1493)
- Álvaro de Caminha, Captain (1493–1499)
- Fernão de Melo, Captain (1499–c.1510)

- Portuguese Tangier

- Governors

- Rodrigo Afonso de Melo, Governor (1471–1484?)
- Manuel de Melo, Governor (1484?–1486)
- João de Meneses, Governor (1486–1489)
- Fernão Martins Mascarenhas, Interim Governor (1487–1489)
- Manuel Pessanha, Interim Governor (1489–1490)
- Lopo Vaz de Azevedo, Governor (1490?–1501)

== Mexico ==
- Tlacala Federation
  - Xicotencatl I (1425-1522), tlatoani of Tizatlan

=== Aztec Empire ===
- Cuauhnahuac
  - Miquiuix, Tlatoani (ruler or governor) (1398-1433)
  - Cuauhtototzin, Tlatoani (1433-?)
  - Tehuehuetzin, Tlatoani (before 1491-1504)
- Teotlatzinco
  - Tochihuitzin coyolchiuhqui, (late 14th-mid 15th centuries) Tlatoani and poet, son of Itzcoatl
- Tepechpan
  - Cuacuauhtzin, Tlatoani and poet (c. 1410-1443)
- Texcoco (altepetl)
  - Nezahualcoyotl (tlatoani), architect, and poet (1402-1472)
  - Nezahualpilli, tlatoani and poet (1464-1515)
  - Cacamatzin, tlatoani and poet (1494-1520)

== See also ==
- List of state leaders in the 15th century
- List of state leaders in the 15th-century Holy Roman Empire
- List of state leaders in 15th-century South Asia
