= Colonial governors by century =

These are lists of territorial governors by century and by year, such as the administrators of colonies, protectorates, or other dependencies. Where applicable, native rulers are also listed.

For the purposes of these lists, a current dependency is any entity listed on these lists of dependent territories and other entities. A dependent territory is normally a territory that does not possess full political independence or sovereignty as a sovereign state yet remains politically outside the controlling state's integral area. This latter condition distinguishes a dependent territory from an autonomous region or administrative division, which forms an integral part of the parent state. The administrators of uninhabited territories are excluded.

== Lists ==
- List of governors of dependent territories in the 21st century
- List of governors of dependent territories in the 20th century
- List of governors of dependent territories in the 19th century
- List of governors of dependent territories in the 18th century
- List of governors of dependent territories in the 17th century
- List of governors of dependent territories in the 16th century
- List of governors of dependent territories in the 15th century
