= António Lopes dos Santos =

Portuguese army general and colonial administrator (1919–2009)

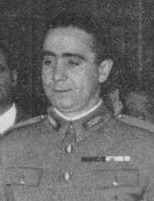

120th Governor of Macau
- In office 17 April 1962 – 24 November 1966
- President: Américo Tomás
- Prime Minister: António de Oliveira Salazar
- Preceded by: Jaime Silvério Marques
- Succeeded by: José Manuel de Sousa e Faro Nobre de Carvalho

Governor of Cape Verde
- In office 1969–1974
- President: Américo Tomás
- Prime Minister: Marcelo Caetano
- Preceded by: Leão Maria Tavares Rosado do Sacramento Monteiro
- Succeeded by: Basílio Pina de Oliveira Seguro

Personal details
- Born: 28 December 1919 Portugal
- Died: 11 May 2009 (aged 89) Lisbon, Portugal

Chinese name
- Traditional Chinese: 羅必信
- Simplified Chinese: 罗必信
Transcriptions
Standard Mandarin
- Hanyu Pinyin: Luó Bìxìn
Yue: Cantonese
- Jyutping: lo4 bit1 seon3

António Adriano Faria Lopes dos Santos (28 December 1919 – 11 May 2009) was a Portuguese army general and colonial administrator.

== Biography ==
He held top military posts both before and after the 1974 Carnation Revolution. He was district governor of Portuguese Mozambique from 1959 until 1962. He was Governor of Macau from 17 April 1962 until July 1966, and chief of staff of Macau's garrison. He was appointed the Senior Assistant to the Portuguese Guinea Commander in Chief under Governor António de Spínola from 1968 until 1970. He was military commander in Portuguese Guinea between 1968 and 1970. He was governor of Portuguese Cape Verde from 13 March 1969 until 1974.

Following the 25 April 1974 Carnation Revolution in Portugal, Antonio Lopes dos Santos became Deputy Army Chief of Staff of the Portuguese Army. He also became head of both the Military Studies Centre and the Military Disciplinary High Council. Lopes dos Santos last official appointment was as the director of the Portuguese National Defense Institute. He remained involved in relations between Macau and Portugal, and was the president of the Jorge Álvares Foundation from 2000 until his death in 2009. He also served as the head of the Portugal-China Friendship Association (AAPC).

Political offices
Preceded by Jaime Silvério Marques	Governor of Macau; 1962–1966	Succeeded by José Manuel Sousa Faro Nobre Carvalho
Preceded by Leão Maria Tavares Rosado do Sacramento Monteiro	Governor of Cape Verde; 1969–1974	Succeeded by Basílio Pina de Oliveira Seguro
