= Togolese nationality law =

National Assembly of Togo
- Long title: Ordonnance 78-34 du 7 septembre 1978 portant Code de la nationalité togolaise
- Enacted by: Government of Togo
- Status: Current legislation

Togolese nationality law is regulated by the Constitution of Togo, as amended; the Togolese Nationality Code, and its revisions; the Code of Persons and Family; the Children's Code; and various international agreements to which the country is a signatory. These laws determine who is, or is eligible to be, a national of Togo. The legal means to acquire nationality, formal legal membership in a nation, differ from the domestic relationship of rights and obligations between a national and the nation, known as citizenship. Nationality describes the relationship of an individual to the state under international law, whereas citizenship is the domestic relationship of an individual within the nation. Togolese nationality is typically obtained under the principal of jus sanguinis, i.e. by birth in Togo or abroad to parents with Togolese nationality. It can be granted to persons with an affiliation to the country, or to a permanent resident who has lived in the country for a given period of time through naturalization.

== Acquisition of nationality ==
Nationality can be acquired in Togo at birth or later in life through naturalization.

=== By birth ===
Those who acquire nationality at birth include:

- Children born in Togo who are habitual residents in the country to two parents also born in Togo;
- Children born abroad to a Togolese father acquire nationality automatically;
- Children born to a Togolese mother and a father who is unknown, or with unknown nationality or who is stateless, must follow an administrative procedure to acquire nationality; (Note: The 1978 Nationality Code conflicts with the 1992 Constitution, which conveys Togolese nationality equally to children born to Togolese fathers or mothers. Though the constitution takes precedent over other legislation, because the Nationality Code is more specific about procedures, administrators often follow the older provisions, according to the United Nations High Commissioner for Refugees.)
- Children born in the country who would otherwise be stateless; or
- Foundlings or orphans under the age of five, whose parents are unknown.

=== By naturalization ===
Naturalization can be granted to persons who have resided in the territory for a sufficient period of time to confirm they understand one of the languages of Togo, the customs and traditions of Togo, and are integrated into the society. General provisions are that applicants have good character and morals; have no criminal convictions which resulted in sentencing in excess of two years; are in good mental and physical health; and have a principal interest in the development of Togo. Applicants must typically have resided in the country for five years. Besides foreigners meeting the criteria, other persons who may be naturalized include:

- Children born in Togo to foreigners who are resident at majority and have lived in Togo since the age of sixteen may opt for nationality by registration without discretion of authorities;
- Children legally adopted by a Togolese parent, at the time of completion of a legal adoption may derive Togolese nationality, if it is in the child's best interest; (Note: Bronwen Manby, a specialist on African nationality laws, notes that the 1978 Nationality Law does not provide for adopted children to acquire nationality. The United Nations booklet on adoptions states that the law in Togo governing child adoption is the Individuals [Persons] and Family Code (French: code des personnes et de la famille), which since 1980 has provided that upon completion of an adoption, the birth family loses legal rights and responsibilities for the child and those pass to the adoptive family. The 2012 Persons and Family code provides in Chapter II, Section 3, Articles 715 and 716 that in the event that a child and its parents have different nationalities or that a child's nationality is changed because a filiation has been established, the law should follow what is in the best interest of the child and the adoption procedures outlined in the Children's Code. (2014 modifications did not change these articles, as they effected only Articles 99, 100, 153, 403, 404, 419, and 420.) Article 17 of the Children's Code specifically provides that a child who is born to Togolese parents and a child of whom either parent is Togolese are considered to be of Togolese nationality. In Article 58 the Children's Code states that illegitimate and adopted children have the same rights and obligations as legitimate children.)
- Children can be automatically naturalized when their parent acquires nationality;
- The legal or customary wife of a Togolese national upon marriage; or
- Persons who have performed exceptional service to the nation may naturalize without a residency period.

== Loss of nationality ==
Togolese nationals can renounce their nationality pending approval by the state and proof that they have obtained other nationality. Persons may be denaturalized in Togo for holding dual nationality, though in practice this applies only to naturalized Togolese. They may also lose their nationality for performing actions, like voting or running for political office, in another state that are typically reserved for citizens; working for a foreign state or military without permission of Togolese authorities; disloyalty to the state; committing crimes against the state or state security; for ordinary serious crimes; or for fraud, misrepresentation, or concealment in a naturalization petition. Persons who previously had nationality who were not deprived of it may repatriate after establishing residency and undergoing an administrative inquiry.

== Dual nationality ==
Togolese law prohibits dual nationality, but in practice only naturalized persons who must renounce other nationality to gain Togolese nationality, are strictly forbidden to have other nationality. Dual nationality is also allowed for married women who automatically acquired other nationality upon marriage to a foreign spouse.

== History ==
The Ewe people in the south, and Gurma and Kabye peoples in the north, along with other tribal people settled in the region without much contact with each other. They did not develop centralized political structures and mainly participated in subsistence economies organized in small villages. Neighboring kingdoms like the Ashanti Empire to the west and Dahomey to the east constantly posed threats with invasions. Between 1471 and 1473, Portuguese navigators João de Santarém and Pêro Escobar sailed along the coast. The Dutch ousted the Portuguese from the area in the early seventeenth century and Danish, Dutch, English, and French traders engaged in the Atlantic slave trade had begun to frequent the region. Around 1650, people from the Portuguese trading post of El Mina settled in Little Popo (also Klien Popo and Petit Popo). Merchants from Brandenburg established a trading post there but in 1688, the Royal African Company was in charge of the fort there, which would become the only significant coastal port in Togo in the slaving era. The Dutch named the area between the Volta River and the Lagos Lagoon straddling the border between current-day Ghana and Togo as the Slave Coast (Dutch: slave-kust) in the 1690s. Slave raiders from the Asante Empire and Kingdom of Dahomey became common in the south and central parts of the region during this time. Simultaneously, the north was attacked by the Ghanaian kingdoms of Dagomba and Mamprusi.

From the eighteenth century, the Danes dominated the slave trade on the Togolese coast, and brought in Protestant missionaries to the area. Around 1728, the Royal African Company ceased operations at Little Popo and the Dutch West India Company took over the trading fort in 1731, operating until around 1760. The Danes established a fort there in 1772, but abandoned it in 1790 and Portuguese traders operated at Little Popo between 1780 and 1790 without establishing a trading post. Probably between the late 1770s and early 1780s, Little Popo again was being operated by the British, as they had an agent stationed there in 1789. In 1795, the fort was attacked by troops from Dahomey and the Hulagan Kingdom centered in Grand-Popo, now in Benin, but within a year, trading had resumed. The Danish abolished slavery in 1802 and withdrew from the area in 1850. Both Britain and the United States abolished the slave trade by 1808, which initially adversely effected trade in the first decades of the nineteenth century along the Gold Coast, but the trade continued at Little Popo mainly because other places to trade had been closed until 1852. That year, the British blockaded the port cities along the Slave Coast to stop slaving and signed a treaty with local rulers at Little Popo to end the slave trade.

In the 1850s the North German Missionary Society, of Bremen, became dominant in the territory, leading to German merchants establishing themselves there during the 1860s. The British purchase of Suez Canal shares in 1875 and bombing of Alexandria, Egypt in 1882, as well as France establishing a protectorate in Tunis in 1881, caused German speculation about acquiring its own territory in Africa. Between 1880 and 1884, businesses were established at Baguida, Little Popo and Lomé by firms from Bremen and Hamburg, and other factories dotted the coast of Togoland. In 1882, Adolph Woermann developed a shipping line transporting goods regularly between Hamburg and coastal West Africa. German Chancellor, Otto von Bismarck, was initially reluctant to support colonization of Africa because of the expense and political climate, but by 1884, he was in favor of growth. When in that year, the German merchants asked him to support them against rival British and French claims, Bismark sent a warship in January and dispatched Gustav Nachtigal to help with negotiations. Nachtigal sailed into Little Popo in February to arrest the King Lawson III, who German merchants claimed was a British agent. He took Lawson and others aboard his ship, and forced Lawson to sign an agreement acknowledging that the German merchants were to pay annual tributes to a rival named Cabocer Quadjovi (also known as Jehowey).

=== German period (1884–1922) ===
On 4 July 1884 a treaty was signed with Chief Mlapa III of Togoville forming a basis to establish a German Protectorate over the territory, which they named after the village. On 5 July the Germans secured the signature of Chief Plakko to acquire Baguida. King Lawson left Little Popo and went to Accra and then Sierra Leone where he unsuccessfully tried to get the British to create a protectorate over Little Popo, and negotiated with the French as well, but by 1886, he learned that the French had agreed to Germany's establishment of a protectorate. In the meantime, the Germans had signed a treaty with Lawson's rivals, King Aiaushi Agbanor, ruler of Grigi and Little Popo; Quadjovi; Chief Pedro Quadjo; and eleven others to secure the area of Little Popo. Through other agreements, they also secured the territory of Lomé. Under the terms of the agreement reached at the Berlin Conference of 1884–1885, lands in the interior which had not been agreed as belonging to European powers, required both occupation by a European power and notification of the other signatory powers. Despite competing claims to the Slave Coast, Germany and France worked out an official compromise in 1887. The Germans began negotiations to settle the boundaries between German and British territory in 1885 and agreed to terms in March 1888. These were officially adopted with the signing of the Anglo-German Agreement of 1890. German conquest of the interior of Togoland began around 1893. Though explorers encountered minor conflicts by 1897, Germany had secured the northern part of the territory and selected Lomé, as the capital of the colony.

Under the terms of the German Colonial Act of 1888, German colonies were not part of the federal union, but they were also not considered foreign. Thus, laws that were extended to the colonies sometimes treated residents as nationals and other times as foreigners. German law applied to those subjects who had been born in Germany. Native subjects in the colonies were not considered to be German, but were allowed to naturalize. Naturalization required ten years residence in the territory and proof of self-employment. It was automatically bestowed upon all members of a family, meaning children and wives derived the nationality of the husband. The Nationality Law of 1913 changed the basis for acquiring German nationality from domicile to patrilineality, but did not alter derivative nationality. In 1914 during World War I, British and French forces invaded Togoland and held it throughout the war. In 1919, the territory was partitioned into British Togoland and French Togoland. Three years after the Treaty of Versailles was signed in 1919, British Togoland was assigned to Britain and French Togoland was assigned to France as League of Nations mandated territories.

=== French mandate/trusteeship (1922–1960) ===
==== Native persons residing in Togoland (1922–1956) ====
Under French law, B-type mandates were construed to be outside of French territory and were to be administered without a nationality code. (Note: According to Philippe Bourmaud, a history professor at Jean Moulin University Lyon 3, type A mandates required that the trustee promulgate a nationality code granting blanket nationality to the inhabitants. Type B and C mandated territories were seen as not sufficiently developed in their political organization to require nationality legislation.) Specifically, the administration agreements stated that indigenous persons were not subjects of the administrator, had a distinct nationality, and could only obtain naturalization on a personal basis from the mandatory power. Under the Code de l'indigénat (Code of Indigenous Status) promulgated for Algeria in 1881, native people in the new colonies followed customary law. The Indigenous Code was extended to French Togoland in 1923. France proposed legislation in 1925 to establish Togolese nationality, but it did not come to fruition. Instead, persons living in the mandate were designated as "protégés" (protected persons) or "indigènes sous Mandat" (mandated natives).

In 1928, France reported to the League of Nations that under the law of 25 March 1915 and the decrees of 25 May 1912 and 14 January 1918 dealing with French nationality and implementation of the French Nationality Law over its territories in 1928, Togolese were allowed to obtain French nationality, though it did not mention naturalization. The 1915 law allowed subjects or protected persons who were non-citizen nationals of Algeria, Morocco, or Tunisia and had established domicile in a French territory to acquire full citizenship, including the naturalization of their wives and minor children, by having received the cross of the Legion of Honor, having obtained a university degree, having rendered service to the nation, having attained the rank of an officer or received a medal from the French army, who had married a Frenchwoman and established a one-year residency; or who had resided for more than ten years in a colony other than their country of origin. The 1929 report contained a new category, "d'indigènes citoyens français" (native citizens of France). On 7 November 1930, a decree was passed specifically authorizing the individual naturalization of persons in the French mandates of Togo and Cameroun. A second decree issued on 17 April 1931, allowed foreigners the option of acquiring French nationality in the mandates by naturalization, after a three-year residency, which would be granted as a united state for all members of a family. On 28 December 1937, a further decree addressed the ability of persons whose parents had different nationalities, as in one was French and one was indigenous, or unknown nationality to acquire French nationality.

After World War II, France strove to create policies which would integrate the inhabitants of its trust territories into the French Union. The Lamine Guèye Law of 1946 proclaimed that all nationals in French overseas territories, but not in the trustee territories, who had previously not been citizens were accorded rights similar to metropolitan citizens. In April, the Indigenous Code was abolished. Because French jurists could not agree if persons in the trust territories or Morocco were able to be French citizens, debate ensued for the drafting of the 1946 Constitution. In the final law, Article 81 of the 1946 Constitution provided rights of citizenship to anyone within the French Union, whether or not they had nationality. They were guaranteed the basic rights contained in the constitution, but not necessarily rights to participate in the French National Assembly. Their specific status "citoyens administrés français" (citizens administered by France) allowed them to work in the French civil service and attend French schools and allowed them free movement within the states of the French Union. On 13 December 1946 the League of Nations Mandate for Togoland was converted to a United Nations Trust Territory. In 1954, after pressure by the UN Trusteeship Council forced change, the French government made changes to Togolese administration. They established a "Conseil de gouvernement" (governing council) made up of fifty percent French administrators and fifty percent members from the Togolese Territorial Assembly who took over the management of the country. The French Governor presided over the council, but had limited authority to act without approval of the administrative body.

==== French nationals residing in Togoland (1922–1956) ====
From 1848, natives of France who settled in French territories were French nationals and were subject to French law. This meant that from 1848 when the Civil Code was extended to all of the French nationals in the colonies, women were legally incapacitated and paternal authority was established over their children. Upon marriage, a woman married to a French man automatically acquired the same nationality as her spouse. Illegitimate children were barred from inheritance and nationality could only be transmitted through a French father. The Nationality Law of 1889 allowed women who would become stateless to retain their French nationality upon marriage. When it passed, it specifically applied to the metropole, Guadeloupe, Martinique and Réunion, but was not extended to the other colonies until 1897.

In 1927, France passed a new Nationality Law, which under Article 8, removed the requirement for married women to automatically derive the nationality of a husband and provided that her nationality could only be changed if she consented to change her nationality. It also allowed children born in France to native-born French women married to foreigners to acquire their nationality from their mothers. When it was implemented it included Guadeloupe, Martinique and Réunion but was extended to the remaining French territories in 1928. A decade later, the legal incapacity of married women was finally invalidated for French nationals. In 1945, a new Code of French Nationality was passed, which conferred once again automatic French nationality on foreign wives of French men, but allowed mothers who were French nationals to pass their nationality to children born outside of France. It expressly applied to Algeria, French Guiana, Guadeloupe, Martinique and Réunion and was extended to the Overseas Territories in 1953, but in the case of the latter had distinctions for the rights of those who were naturalized.

==== Transition to independence (1956–1960) ====
In 1956, the French Nationality Code of 1945 was made applicable to Togo and Cameroun, but in keeping with the trusteeship agreement could not be a blanket conferral of French nationality upon all Togolese. Decree No. 56-361 promulgated in Togo on 27 March, became effective on 1 July and provided that any person established in Togo who did not have French nationality could acquire it through naturalization, reinstatement, marriage, or declaration. A special provision grandfathered those who had already become nationals of the French Union as exempt from the new provisions. Replacing references to persons born in France in the 1945 Code with the phrase born "in a territory subject to French sovereignty" (French: en territoire soumis à la souveraineté française), the 1956 Decree established a separate nationality for the Trust Territory. Based upon legal filiation proven under French law, children automatically acquired nationality if their father was born in Togo or if they were foundlings. Children born in Togo would claim French nationality without having to renounce their status as Togolese if they resided in Togo between the ages of sixteen and twenty-one, but not if they subsequently moved to France. Nationality acquired through a mother could be repudiated upon a child reaching majority. Wives automatically acquired nationality upon marriage, unless they declared that they wished to retain their nationality of origin. Foreigners could naturalize as French under the same provisions in Togo that foreigners could naturalize in any other French Overseas Territory, after a five-year residency and proof of assimilation, but native Togolese under the new law had to meet the same naturalization requirements as foreigners to acquire French nationality. Under the law, Togolese nationality had no international recognition and Togolese traveled as French protected persons.

On 28 October 1956, a referendum was held, gaining a majority approval, for requesting that the trusteeship be terminated. In 1957, the UN Trusteeship Council noted that as Togo had no constitutional autonomy, the Togolese population could not decide on the nature of their relationship with France and recommended change. Reforms were undertaken to grant more autonomy to Togo. These included that the Governor or High Commissioner was no longer allowed to intervene in meetings of the council. The Council of Ministers was responsible for implementation of laws and organization of services, but the authority for decisions upon matters of state, such as dissolving the legislature, rested with the Prime Minister and his Cabinet. A UN Commission visited Togo in May and June 1957, but did not recommend lifting the trusteeship. In a September meeting with the UN Trusteeship Council, France's representative gave assurances that further reforms were forthcoming which would grant Toto full jurisdiction over legislation, except with respect to the Universal Declaration of Human Rights in the French Constitution and international obligations France had ratified on behalf of Togo; judicial matters, other than high court decisions on appeals and matters against judgments rendered by Togolese courts; and its internal governmental organization.

The Trusteeship Council agreed to lift the Trusteeship in 1958, pending a favorable vote in the Togolese Assembly which would be monitored by the United Nations, and legislative action by the French government to enact the promised reforms for autonomy, which were enacted on 30 December 1958. With the passage of the Constitution of 1958, nationality provisions were standardized for France, Overseas Departments, and Overseas Territories, but did not apply to Togo, as Togo already had a separately defined nationality. The provisions of the constitution in Article 77 did not allow newly independent states to establish nationality outside of a common French, and thus French Community, nationality. Thus, when Guinea gained its independence in September 1958, it rejected the French constitution in favor of defining its own nationals. Faced with continual upheaval, in 1959, France recognized that the African states could have separate nationality codes and still be part of the French Community.

=== Post-independence (1960–present) ===
Togo gained its independence on 27 April 1960 and issued its first nationality law (Loi No. 61-18) on 25 July 1961. Under the terms of the statute, children derived nationality by birth in the territory or by descent, from a father except in the instances that the father was stateless or of unknown nationality. Nationality derived in this instance maternally, could be reputed when the child reached majority. It removed distinctions between legitimate and illegitimate children. Children born in Togo to foreigners, except those who had diplomatic immunity, automatically acquired Togolese nationality and an obligation to perform military service, upon reaching majority, if they had lived in the country from the age of sixteen and had not declined acquiring Togolese nationality. Women automatically acquired Togolese nationality upon marriage unless they declared a wish to retain their nationality of origin. Naturalization required a five-year residency, unless one was married to a Togolese national or had performed exceptional service to the nation.

In 1967, after a coup d'état, political parties were banned and the constitution was suspended. In 1978, a new nationality law (Ordonnance No 78-34) was passed. New provisions under the statute were that under Article 2, anyone born in Togolese territory who had no other nationality were automatically Togolese and under Article 8, that children born in Togo to foreigners without diplomatic immunity had the option of obtaining nationality upon reaching majority, if they had lived in the country since the age of sixteen. A new constitution, adopted in 1979, allowed the president to serve for seven years and made the president head of the state, and all state agencies, departments, and ministries. In 1980, an amendment (Ordonnance N° 80–27) to the 1978 Nationality Code allowed adult children of a naturalizing foreigner to join in the petition for naturalization of their father.

A new constitution, adopted in 1992 provided that Togolese nationality could be acquired through a child's father or mother. Because the nationality laws were not updated, discrepancies in legislation occurred, leaving ambiguity as to what procedure officials should follow. Specific issues include that the constitution grants men and women equal ability to transfer their nationality to their children but the nationality code only allows a mother to convey her nationality to her children if the father is stateless or has unknown nationality, or the father is unknown and that a child automatically acquires nationality from their father but not their mother. Subsequently, a 2007 law was adopted for children which specifically addresses certain nationality issues, but also conflicts with the nationality code. The Children's Code (Loi N° 2007–017) provided in Article 17 that any child whose father or mother is Togolese is also Togolese; in Article 18 that children born to foreigners in Togo who lived in Togo from the age of sixteen can acquire Togolese nationality upon reaching majority by decree; in Article 19 that foundlings or children with unknown parents under the age of five are considered as Togolese; in Article 20 that unmarried children, who have not served in a foreign military, been expelled or placed under house arrest, or sentenced to a criminal imprisonment of more than six months may derive the father's nationality when he is naturalized; and in Article 58 that illegitimate and adopted children have the same rights and obligations as legitimate children.

The 2012 Code of Persons and Family allowed divorced women to retain their nationality, but it is in conflict with the 1978 Nationality Code which denaturalized women upon termination of a marriage. The Family Code was further modified in 2014 to eliminate gender discrimination in the areas of family maintenance, family management, marriage and divorce, and succession. In 2017, women's groups met with government ministers, jurists, and civil society organizations in an attempt to press for the nationality code to be brought in line with other more recent legislation. In addition to addressing discrepancies about children acquiring nationality from their mothers and changed rules on denaturalization because of divorce, women pointed out the discriminatory provision that a foreign man who marries a Togolese woman must naturalize, rather than acquiring Togolese nationality upon marriage.
