= Francisco de Vasconcelos da Cunha =

Portuguese colonial administrator

Colonial governor of Cape Verde
- In office 1624–1628
- Preceded by: Manuel Afonso de Guerra
- Succeeded by: João Pereira Corte-Real

Governor and Captain General of Angola
- In office 1634 – 18 October 1639
- Preceded by: Manuel Pereira Coutinho
- Succeeded by: Pedro César de Meneses

Personal details
- Born: c. 1590

Francisco de Vasconcelos da Cunha (c.1590 – c. mid 17th century) was a Portuguese colonial administrator. He was born around 1590, and was the governor of Portuguese Cape Verde from 1624 to 1628. He succeeded Manuel Afonso de Guerra, who was also the bishop of Santiago de Cabo Verde. He was succeeded by João Pereira Corte-Real. In 1634, he became the captain-general of Portuguese Angola, succeeding Manuel Pereira Coutinho. He was succeeded on 18 October 1639 by Pedro César de Meneses.

== See also ==
- List of colonial governors of Cape Verde
- List of colonial governors of Angola

== Notes ==
Preceded by Manuel Afonso de Guerra	Colonial governor of Cape Verde; 1624-28	Succeeded by João Pereira Corte-Real
Preceded by Manuel Pereira Coutinho	Governor and Capitan-General of Angola; 1634-39	Succeeded by Pedro César de Meneses
