= Cristóvão Soares de Melo =

Portuguese colonial administrator

Cristóvão Soares de Melo (died 1584) was a Portuguese colonial administrator. He was corregedor of Portuguese Cape Verde between 1577 and 1579. His predecessor was António Velho Tinoco and his successor was Diogo Dias Magro.

== See also ==
- List of colonial governors of Cape Verde
- History of Cape Verde

== Notes ==
| Preceded by António Velho Tinoco | Corregedor of Cape Verde; 1577-1579 | Succeeded by Diogo Dias Magro |
