= Rolim =

Rolim is a given name and a surname. Notable people with the name include:

- Rolim Amaro (1942–2001), aka "Comandante Rolim," Brazilian pilot, airline owner, founder of TAM Airlines
- Daniel Rolim Oliveira (born 1985), Brazilian rally driver
- Francisco Rolim, captain-general of Portuguese Cape Verde, from 3 April 1622 until his death a few months later
- Yann Rolim (born 1995), Brazilian professional footballer

== See also ==
- Rolim Adolfo Amaro Airport or Jundiaí Airport (IATA: QDV, ICAO: SBJD), the airport serving Jundiaí, Brazil
- Rolim de Moura, municipality located in the Brazilian state of Rondônia
