= Manuel Afonso de Guerra =

Portuguese Bishop who served as Governor of Portuguese Cape Verde

- Bishop of Santiago de Cabo Verde
- Church: Catholic Church
- Diocese: Diocese of Santiago de Cabo Verde
- In office: 24 February 1616 – 8 March 1624
- Predecessor: Sebastião da Ascensão
- Successor: Lourenço Garro

Personal details
- Born: 1572 Guimarães, Entre Douro e Minho, Kingdom of Portugal and the Algarves
- Died: 8 March 1624 (aged 51–52)

Manuel Afonso de Guerra was a Portuguese Bishop who served as Governor of Portuguese Cape Verde from 1622 until his death on 8 March 1624. This title was held jointly with his role as Bishop of Santiago de Cabo Verde, which he held from 24 February 1616 until his death. He was succeeded as bishop by Lorenzo Garro.

Preceded by Francisco Rolim	Colonial governor of Cape Verde; 1622-1624	Succeeded by Francisco de Vasconcelos da Cunha
Preceded by Sebastião de Ascensão	Bishop of Santiago de Cabo Verde; 1622-1624	Succeeded by Lorenzo Garro
