= Francisco Rolim =

Francisco Rolim was a captain-general of Portuguese Cape Verde, from 3 April 1622 until his death a few months later.

Preceded by Francisco de Moura	Colonial Governor of Cape Verde; 1622	Succeeded by Manuel Afonso de Guerra
