= Fort of Cinco Ribeiras =

Fort in the Azores

- Forte das Cinco Ribeiras
- Terceira, Central, name=Azores in Portugal
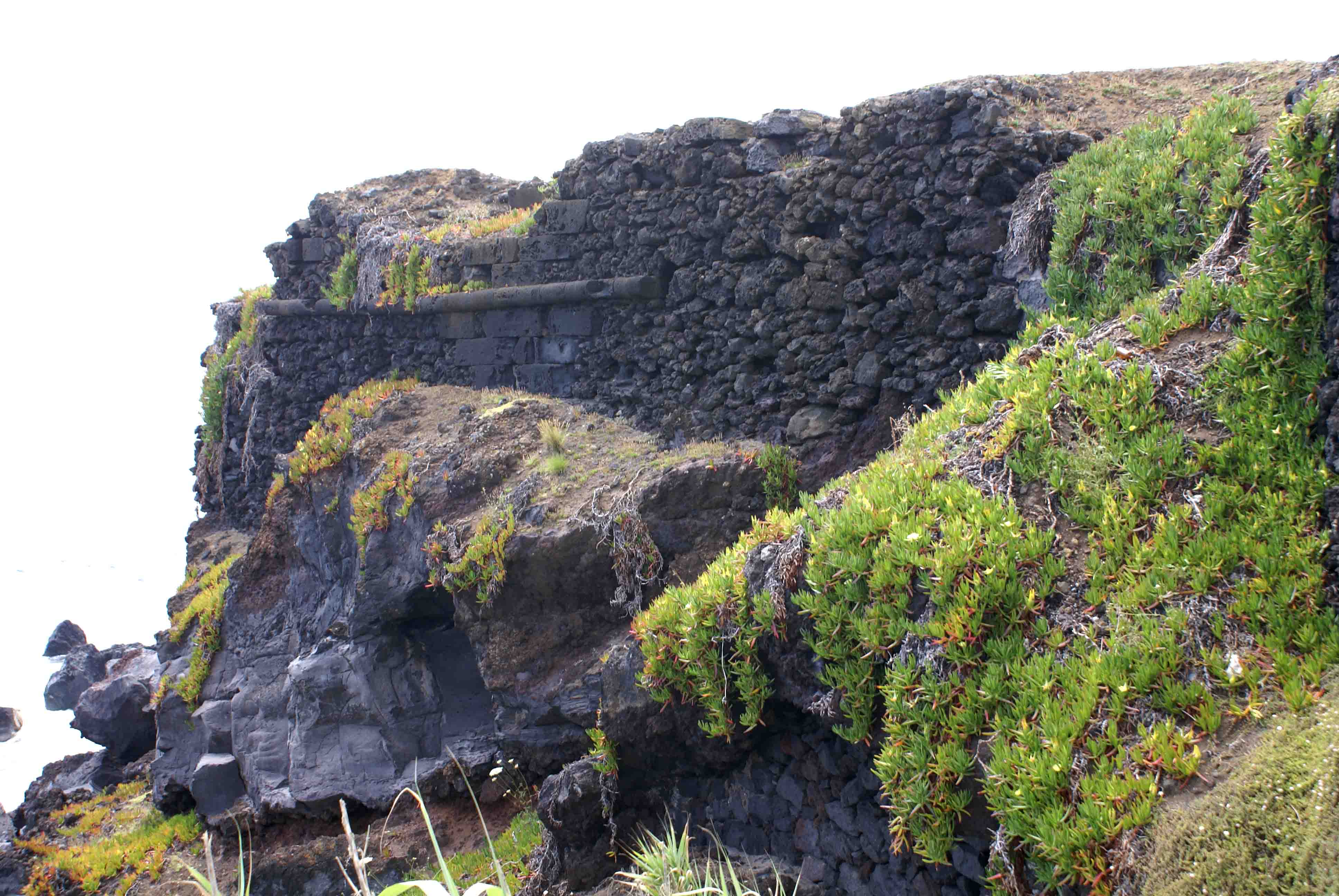
- A view of the eastern edge of the Fort of Cinco Ribeiras, along the coast

Site information
- Type: Fort
- Owner: Portuguese Republic
- Open to the public: Public

Location
- Location of the fort within the municipality of Angra do Heroísmo
- Coordinates: 38°40′32″N 27°19′44″W

Site history
- Built: 16th century
- Materials: Basalt

The Fort of Cinco Ribeiras (Portuguese: Forte das Cinco Ribeiras), also known as the Fort of Nossa Senhora do Pilar or Fort of São Bartolomeu, ruins of a 16th-century fortification located in the municipality of Angra do Heroísmo, along the southeast coast of Terceira, Portuguese archipelago of the Azores.

== History ==
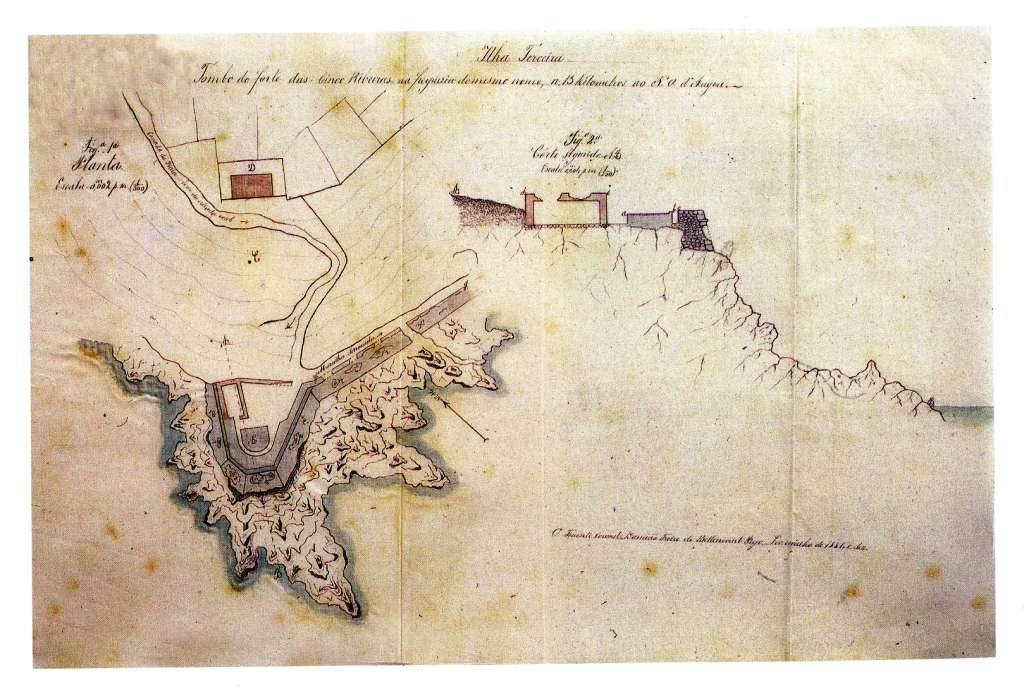
Tombo do Forte das Cinco Ribeiras, na freguesia de mesmo nome...", Ilha Terceira (Açores), Portugal.

This fort developed from a line of bastions, opened during the period of the Succession Crisis of 1580, between 1579 and 1581, order by the Corregedor of the Açores, Ciprião de Figueiredo e Vasconcelos from a defensive plan elaborated by Tommaso Benedetto. The line served as coastal defences for consistent attacks by privateers and pirates, during this period of exploration and support of Atlantic colonies of North America.

The fort was raised in 1653, under the initiative of the municipal authority, who was preoccupied with pirate attacks, who was threatened by squadron of 40 to 50 ships. The municipality also decided to collaborate with the Provisioner of Arms, for the defence of the island, owing to the possible invasion by Spanish during the Portuguese Restoration.

During the War of Spanish Succession (1702-1714) the fort was referred to as "O Forte de Nossa Senhora do Pillar".

At the time of the establishment of the Captaincy-General of the Azores, its state was reported, as:

36 - Fort of Our Lady of the Pillar. Need to concentrate on the door; it has six canon emplacements and we need to open another two. There are four capable, iron pieces and in good repair. Need two pieces for the two canon emplacements that should be opened up to garrison six artillery and 24 auxiliaries.

It was referred to as "29. Fort of Cinco Ribeiras site of the parish of Santa Bárbara alongside Our Lady of the Pillar" in the report "Revista aos fortes que defendem a costa da ilha Terceira", of adjunct Manoel Correa Branco (1776), who referred to the repairs necessary: "This fort required rebuilding in the east, and the ceiling of the house, and the fort, in all the exterior area, broken, garrisoned and plastered."

The plans for the fort, were identified in the Colecção de Plantas e Alçados de 32 Fortalezas dos Açores (Collection of Plans and Elevations of 32 Fortresses of the Azores) by José Rodrigo de Almeida in 1806. The report of Marshall Baron of Bastos (1862) supported the notion that the fortifications were still viable over the centuries. But, by 1881 the spaces were abandoned and in a state of ruin.

In 1938, a process was opened to transfer the property to the Ministry of Finances, but, was suspended in 1941 during the context of World War II, when it was expropriated for military use. Its transfer was completed in 1965.

By the beginning of the 21st century, the fort was completely abandoned and in a precarious state of conservation.

== Architecture ==
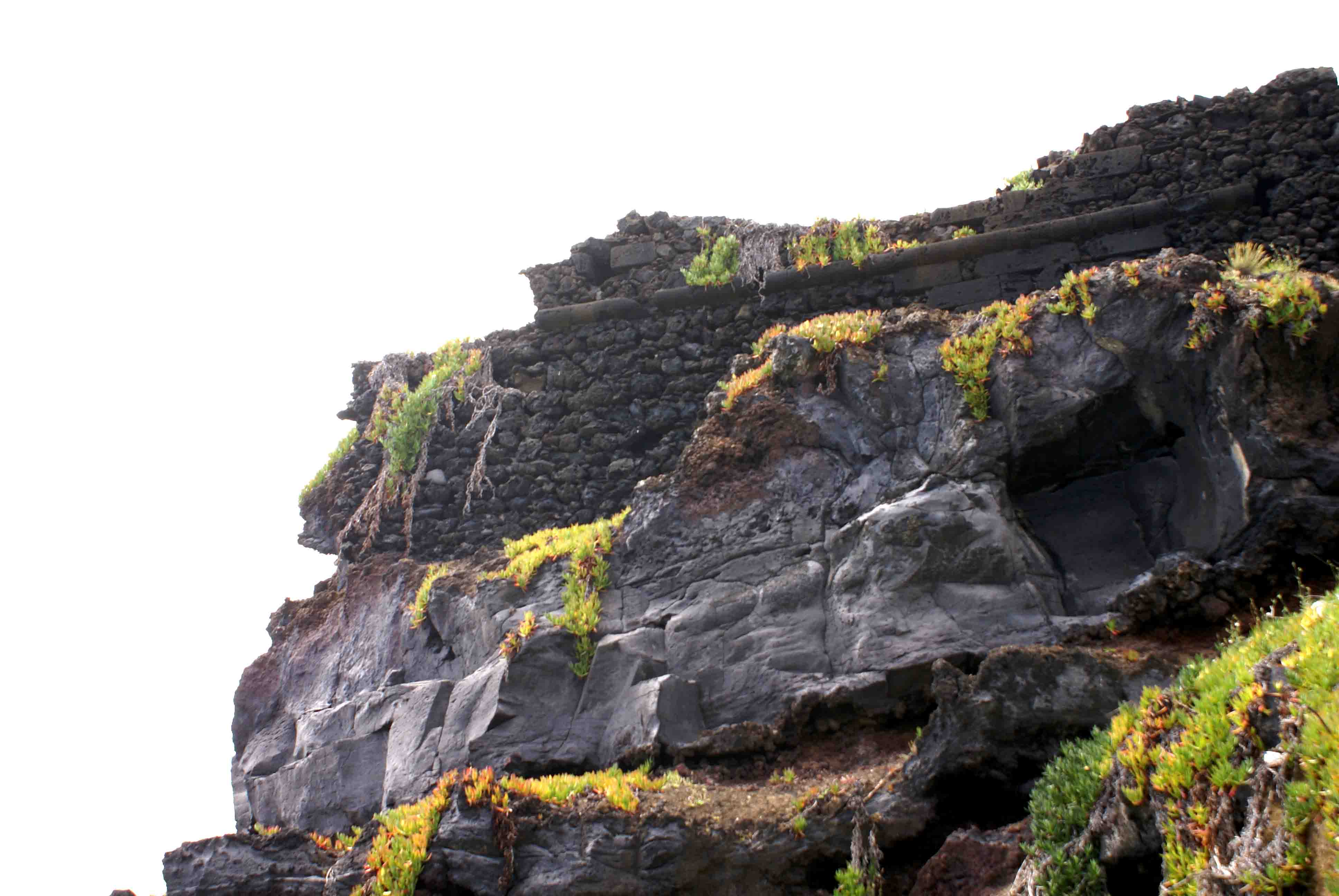
The basalt base of the Fort at the edge of the cliff

The fort is located over a dominant section of the beach, consisting of a fortification destined for the defence of the coastal anchorage, from pirates and privateers that frequented this region of the Atlantic Ocean. It is situated in an isolated basalt, arriba, originating from the volcanic eruption of the Santa Bárbara Massif, at sea level.

The polygonal bastion is adapted to the rock, constructed of masonry and rock, occupying an area of 210 square metres (2,300 ft^{2}).

The walls delimit a platform that includes one piece extending through the barbette. Internally is a powerhouse and the walls provided spots for fusiliers. The defence is complemented by another line of trenches, composed of masonry and mortar, that extend towards the east for 150 metres (490 ft).
