= Basílio Pina de Oliveira Seguro =

Portuguese soldier and politician (died 2008)

Colonial governor of Cape Verde
- In office 1974 – 25 April 1974
- Preceded by: António Adriano Faria Lopes dos Santos
- Succeeded by: Henrique Afonso da Silva Horta

Personal details
- Born: Guarda, Portugal
- Died: 18 November 2008 Estoril

Basílio Pina de Oliveira Seguro (died 18 November 2008) was a Portuguese colonial administrator and a military officer. He was governor of the district of Cabo Delgado in Mozambique from 1961 to 1969. He was governor of Cape Verde for over a month from March to 25 April 1974, when he was exempted by decree from the Junta de Salvação Nacional.

Decorations:

- Officer of the Military Order of Avis (8 July 1962)
- Grand Officer of the Order of Prince Henry the Navigator (14 February 1970)
- Commander of the Order of Christ (30 April 1974)
- Commander of the Military Order of Avis (21 May 1985)

== See also ==
- List of colonial governors of Cape Verde

Preceded by António Adriano Faria Lopes dos Santos	Colonial governor of Cape Verde; 1974	Succeeded by Henrique Afonso da Silva Horta
