= Manuel António Martins =

Portuguese businessman and colonial governor

Colonial governor of Cape Verde
- In office 14 February 1834 – 1835
- Preceded by: D. José Coutinho de Lencastre
- Succeeded by: Joaquim Pereira Marinho

Personal details
- Born: 1772
- Died: 1845 (aged 72–73) Santa Maria, Portuguese Cape Verde

Manuel António Martins (1772 in Braga-1845) was a Portuguese businessman and colonial governor of Cape Verde and Portuguese Guinea from 1834 to 1835. Martins was said to be the richest man in the country and nicknamed the Napoleon of the Cape Verde Islands. He arrived in Cape Verde in 1792. He started the exploitation of the salt ponds of Pedra de Lume on the island of Sal in 1796.

In May 1819, Martins co-established a fishing company with the Governor of Cape Verde, António Pusich. Martins's partnership with Pusich soured after Pusich accused Martin of trying to sell São Vicente and Sal to the British. After the accusation, Martins instigated a riot in Praia in May 1821 that led to the overthrow of Pusich. In 1819, Martins was appointed by Samuel Hodges, Jr. as an honorary vice-consul for the United States on the island of Boa Vista. He founded the town of Santa Maria on Sal in 1830.

In December 1833, Martins was appointed colonial governor of Cape Verde and Guinea, assuming office on 14 February 1834. His tenure lasted until March 1835. In 1834 he established the municipality of Santa Catarina with its seat in Picos, replacing the old municipality of Ribeira Grande.

== See also ==
- List of colonial governors of Cape Verde

== Notes ==
Preceded by D. José Coutinho de Lencastre	Colonial Governor of Cape Verde; 1834-35	Succeeded by Joaquim Pereira Marinho
