= Domingos Correia Arouca =

Portuguese general, administrator and colonial governor

Colonial governor of Cape Verde
- In office 1836–1837
- Preceded by: Joaquim Pereira Marinho
- Succeeded by: Joaquim Pereira Marinho

Personal details
- Born: 1 May 1790 Castro Marim
- Died: 24 January 1861 (aged 70) Santa Isabel, Lisbon

Domingos Correia Arouca (older spelling: Domingos Corrêa Arouca) (1 May 1790 – 24 January 1861) was a Portuguese general, administrator and colonial governor of Cape Verde from 1835 to 1837, he was also a Portuguese politician and freemason.

== Biography ==
Correia Arouca was born in Castro Marim to Simão (born in Castro Marim-14 May 1827 in Castro Marim) and Maria Teresa Cândida Mascarenhas (born and died in Castro Marim), he originated from an Algarvian family. He is paternally descended from João Fernandes Zuzarte, Knight of Casa Real and Afonso de Arouca who was a criminal and civil judge of Beja on 17 August 1450.

He was an official in the army, fought in the Peninsular War and took part in the military company in Mozambique. He was lieutenant for Mozambique in 1810 and he commanded the companies in Inhambane and Quelimane and was overseas governor of the district. He was Knight of Casa Real for Alvará on 4 December 1834

In early 1836, he became the 73rd governor of Cape Verde in which he would govern even into the September Revolution in Portugal. He succeeded Joaquim Pereira Marinho on 24 July and later would be succeeded by that person on 13 January as its people did not supported Correia Arouca.

He was later senator of the Kingdom of Portugal.

He was commander of the Ordem Militar de Avis, he was the 133rd commander of the Order of Nossa Senhora da Conceição de Vila Viçosa on 18 February 1840.

He reached the 33rd grade of the Ancient and Accepted Scottish Rite of Freemasonry, after he took part in the Supreme Scottish Rite Council of José da Silva Carvalho.

He died on 24 January 1861 in Santa Isabel in Lisbon and was buried at Cemitério dos Prazeres.

== Personal life ==
He married Maria Teresa Augusta de Sousa (1808 in Chamusca, São Bras-11 September 1884 in Santos-o-Velho, Lisbon), daughter of António José Ferreira and his wife Ana Rita. They were parents of Frederico de Gusmão Correia Arouca and had a child Maria Amália de Gusmão Correia Arouca (Lisbon, Santa Isabel, Fevereiro de 1850 - ?).

== See also ==
- List of colonial governors of Cape Verde

== Notes ==
Preceded by Joaquim Pereira Marinho	Colonial Governor of Cape Verde; 1836-37	Succeeded by Joaquim Pereira Marinho
