= Henrique da Silva Horta =

Portuguese colonial administrator

Henrique Afonso da Silva Horta

Colonial governor of Cape Verde
- In office 6 August 1974 – 21 September 1974
- Preceded by: Basílio Pina de Oliveira Seguro
- Succeeded by: Vicente Almeida d'Eça

Personal details
- Born: 21 September 1920 Lisbon
- Died: 29 January 2012 (aged 91) Lisbon

Henrique Afonso da Silva Horta (21 September 1920 – 29 January 2012) was a Portuguese colonial administrator, and a vice-admiral of the Portuguese Navy.

He entered the Naval School in 1940, and served as naval officer in the 1950s in Portuguese Guinea, where he was also president of Bissau's municipal council. He was the last commander of the navy school ship Sagres II and the first commander of the Sagres III in 1961. After the Carnation Revolution of April 1974, which toppled the fascist regime of Estado Novo, he was Governor of Cape Verde from 6 August until 21 September 1974. He was Minister of the Republic for the Azores Autonomous Region from 11 September 1978 until 28 April 1981. He retired from service in 1990, and died on 29 January 2012.

He received the following decorations:

- Portuguese:
  - Commander of the Order of Prince Henry
  - Grand Cross of the Order of Christ
  - Grand Cross of the Military Order of Avis
- foreign:
  - Austria: Grand Cross of the Order of Merit
  - Belgium: Grand Cross of the Order of Leopold II
  - Brazil: Officer of the Order of Naval Merit, Silver Medal of Merit Santos-Dumont, Knight of Order of Aeronautical Merit, Medal of Merit Tamandaré
  - Congo: Grand Officer of the Order of Merit
  - Denmark: Grand Cross of the Order of the Dannebrog
  - Egypt: 1st Class of the Order of Merit
  - France: Commander of the National Order of the Legion of Honour
  - Greece: Grand Cross of the Order of the Phoenix
  - Hungary: Grand Cross of the Order of the Flag
  - Iceland: Grand Cross of the Order of the Falcon
  - Italy: Grand Cross of the Order of Merit
  - Luxembourg: Grand Cross of the Order of Adolphe of Nassau
  - Malta: Grand Cross of the Order pro Merito Melitensi
  - Norway: Grand Cross of the Order of St. Olav
  - Spain: Cross of First Class with White Badge of the Order of Naval Merit
  - United Kingdom: Grand Officer of the Royal Victorian Order
  - Yugoslavia: Grand Cross of the Order of the Yugoslav Flag

== See also ==
- List of colonial governors of Cape Verde

Preceded by Basílio Pina de Oliveira Seguro	Colonial governor of Cape Verde; 1974	Succeeded by Vicente Almeida d'Eça
