= Teófilo Duarte =

Portuguese colonial administrator, military officer and politician

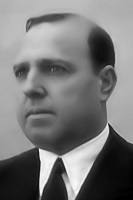

Colonial governor of Cape Verde
- In office 9 March 1918 – 1919
- Preceded by: Abel Fontoura da Costa
- Succeeded by: Manuel Firmino de Almeida Maia Magalhães

Colonial governor of Portuguese Timor
- In office 30 September 1926 – 22 December 1928
- Preceded by: Raimundo Enes Meira
- Succeeded by: Cesário Augusto de Almeida Viana

Personal details
- Born: 6 October 1898 Idanha-a-Nova
- Died: 16 May 1958 (aged 59) Lisbon

Teófilo Duarte (6 October 1898 – 16 May 1958) was a Portuguese colonial administrator, a military officer and a politician. He was a supporter of the Sidonist movement and the Estado Novo.

He was born on 6 October 1898 in Idanha-a-Nova, eastern Portugal. An army officer, he was governor of Cape Verde from 9 March 1918 to 1919. Having participated in movements against the democratic governments, he was dismissed from the Portuguese Army in 1920, only to be reinstated after the 28 May 1926 coup d'état. He was governor of Portuguese Timor from 30 September 1926 to 22 December 1928. He encouraged Portuguese immigration to the colony, including political deportees. Under his rule, forced labour took a rise in East Timor.

He was Minister of Colonies from 4 February 1947 to 2 August 1950 under Prime Minister Salazar. On 1 September 1950, he was awarded with the Grand Cross of the Military Order of Christ.

== See also ==
- List of colonial governors of Cape Verde
- List of colonial governors of Portuguese Timor

Preceded by Abel Fontoura da Costa	Colonial governor of Cape Verde; 1918-1919	Succeeded by Manuel Firmino de Almeida Maia Magalhães
Preceded by Raimundo Enes Meira	Governor of Portuguese Timor; 1926-1928	Succeeded by Cesário Augusto de Almeida Viana
