= Afonso Ribeiro =

First person exiled in Brazil

Captain of Alcatrazes Islands
- In office 1504 – before 1508
- Preceded by: João de Santarém
- Succeeded by: Rodrigi Varela

Personal details
- Born: Portugal
- Died: Portuguese Empire

Afonso Ribeiro was the first person exiled in Brazil, namely referred to in the letter of Pero Vaz de Caminha of 1500.

== Biography ==
It is recorded in Caminha's letter that, while returning from a voyage to the Indies, Pedro Álvares Cabral left two exiles on Brazilian soil to walk with the Indians and understand their lives and their manners. One was Afonso Ribeiro and the other, whose identity is not known with certainty, may have been João de Thomar.

Afonso was condemned for deportation for being "guilty of death"; that is, he was accused of committing an assassination. He had been raised by João de Telo and was about to marry Elena Gonçalves, who, disillusioned by her fiancée, took religious vows.

It was registered by Valentim Fernandes, a royal notary, that the two exiles stayed for 20 months in that land and, upon returning, told that they had lived with the Indians. It is a probability that they were rescued during the expedition of Gonçalo Coelho in 1501 and 1502. It was also stated, not long after Cabral's return, that Afonso Ribeiro, at the height of his despair, took possession of a pirogue and ventured out into the sea, trying to reach the fleet of the men who had left him. After paddling for some time, he became exhausted; seeing only the sails of the vessels already at high sea, he was certain that he would not reach the ships.

He probably headed to Cape Verde around 1503 or 1504 and possibly later became captain of Cape Verde's Alcatrazes, which may refer to Maio. He might have been the second captain before João de Santarém. He left the post before 1508, which was later taken by Rodrigo Varela who was the last captain of Alcatrazes.

== See also ==
- Pero Vaz de Caminha

== Bibliography ==
- Vainfas, Ronaldo (head). Dicionário do Brasil Colonial: 1500 - 1808. (Dictionary of Colonial Brazil: 1500-1808) Rio de Janeiro: Objetiva, 2000

Preceded by João de Santarém	Captain of Alcatrazes Islands, Cape Verde; 1504-before 1508	Succeeded by Rodrigo Varela
