= Alfredo Barjona de Freitas =

Portuguese colonial administrator, military officer and politician

Colonial governor of Cape Verde
- In office 12 August 1903 – 29 December 1904
- Preceded by: Francisco de Paula Cid
- Succeeded by: Amâncio Alpoim de Cerqueira Borges Cabral

Personal details
- Born: 11 April 1860 Coimbra
- Died: 8 May 1923 (aged 63) Lisbon

António Alfredo Barjona de Freitas (11 April 1860 – 8 May 1923) was a Portuguese colonial administrator, military officer and politician.

He was governor general of Cape Verde from 12 August 1903 until 29 December 1904. He was Minister of Public Works from 14 May to 22 December 1909 in the government of Venceslau de Lima.

== Works ==
- Considerações sobre a província de Cabo Verde: comunicações à Sociedade de Geographia de Lisboa. Lisbon, Livraria Ferin, 1905.

== See also ==
- List of colonial governors of Cape Verde

Preceded by Francisco de Paula Cid	Colonial governor of Cape Verde; 1903-1904	Succeeded by Amâncio Alpoim de Cerqueira Borges Cabral
