= Vicente Almeida d'Eça =

Portuguese colonial administrator (1918–2018)

Vice-Admiral Vicente Manuel de Moura Coutinho de Almeida d'Eça (31 July 1918 – 13 October 2018) was a Portuguese colonial administrator who served as the last Governor of Portuguese Cape Verde in 1974, and then its High Commissioner from December 1974 until its independence from Portugal in July 1975. Almeida turned 100 in July 2018 and died three months later.

Preceded by Henrique Afonso da Silva Horta	Colonial governor of Cape Verde; 1974	Succeeded by became High Commissioner
Preceded by as (Colonial) Governor	High commissioner of Cape Verde; 1974–1975	Succeeded by post abolished, Cape Verde became independent
