= João da Mata Chapuzet =

Portuguese colonial administrator and military architect

Colonial governor of Cape Verde
- In office 16 January 1823 – 13 December 1826
- Preceded by: António Pusich
- Succeeded by: Caetano Procópio Godinho de Vasconcelos

Personal details
- Born: 1777 Lisbon
- Died: 8 August 1842 (age 65) Lisbon

João da Mata Chapuzet (1777 – 8 August 1842) was a Portuguese colonial administrator and a military architect. He was colonial governor of Cape Verde, succeeding António Pusich on 16 January 1823. He was succeeded as governor by Caetano Procópio Godinho de Vasconcelos on 13 December 1826. Governor Chapuzet initiated the modernisation of the city of Praia.

== See also ==
- List of colonial governors of Cape Verde
- History of Cape Verde

== Notes ==
Preceded by António Pusich	Colonial governor of Cape Verde; 1823-1826	Succeeded by Caetano Procópio Godinho de Vasconcelos
