= José da Silva Maldonado d'Eça =

Portuguese colonial administrator

Colonial governor of Cape Verde
- In office 19 June 1795 – 10 September 1795
- Preceded by: Francisco José Teixeira Carneiro
- Succeeded by: Marcelino António Bastos

Personal details
- Died: 10 September 1795

José da Silva Maldonado d'Eça was a Portuguese colonial administrator. He was governor of the colony of Cape Verde from 19 June 1795 until his death on 10 September 1795. He succeeded Francisco José Teixeira Carneiro and was succeeded by Marcelino António Bastos. During his time as governor, the first cotton fields were planted in Cape Verde.

== See also ==
- List of colonial governors of Cape Verde

== Notes ==
Preceded by Francisco José Teixeira Carneiro	Colonial governor of Cape Verde; 1795	Succeeded by Marcelino António Bastos
