= Abel Fontoura da Costa =

Portuguese soldier, politician, and scientist (1869–1940)

Colonial governor of Cape Verde
- In office 11 September 1915 – 9 March 1918
- Preceded by: Joaquim Pedro Vieira Judice Bicker
- Succeeded by: Teófilo Duarte

Personal details
- Born: 9 December 1869 Alpiarça
- Died: 7 December 1940 (aged 70) São Pedro do Estoril, Cascais

Abel Fontoura da Costa (9 December 1869 – 7 December 1940) was a Portuguese colonial administrator, a military officer, a politician and a scientist.

He attended the Royal Military College and enlisted into the Navy in 1887. His highest rank was Captain. In 1901, he took part in a commission that marked the boundary between Portuguese Angola and Congo Free State. He was governor of Cape Verde from 11 September 1915 until 9 March 1918. He was Minister of Agriculture in 1923, in the government of António Maria da Silva. He was the director of the Escola Náutica from 1936 to 1939.

He received the following decorations:

- Commander of the Military Order of Avis of Portugal (11 March 1919)
- Grand Officer of the Military Order of Avis of Portugal (19 October 1920)

== See also ==
- List of colonial governors of Cape Verde

Preceded by Joaquim Pedro Vieira Judice Bicker	Colonial governor of Cape Verde; 1915-1918	Succeeded by Teófilo Duarte
