= Bernardo António da Costa de Sousa de Macedo =

Portuguese colonial administrator, Vice-Admiral and politician

Bernardo António da Costa de Macedo

Colonial governor of Cape Verde
- In office 28 August 1907 – 1909
- Preceded by: Amâncio Alpoim de Cerqueira Borges Cabral
- Succeeded by: Martinho Pinto de Queirós

Personal details
- Born: 16 September 1863 Anjos, Lisbon
- Died: 16 June 1947 (aged 83) Lisbon

Bernardo António da Costa de Sousa de Macedo (16 September 1863 – 16 June 1947) was a Portuguese colonial administrator, a Vice-Admiral and a politician. He was a son of Luís António da Costa de Sousa de Macedo e Albuquerque, Count of Mesquitela, and Mariana Carolina da Mota e Silva. He was married to Maria Adelaide Pinto Barbosa Cardoso.

He was governor general of Cape Verde from 28 August 1907 until 1909. He received the following decorations:

- Grand Officer of the Military Order of Avis of Portugal (11 March 1919)
- Grand Cross of the Military Order of Avis of Portugal (19 October 1920)
- Grand Cross of the Order of Christ of Portugal (22 October 1930)

== See also ==
- List of colonial governors of Cape Verde

Preceded by Amâncio Alpoim de Cerqueira Borges Cabral	Colonial governor of Cape Verde; 1907-1909	Succeeded by Martinho Pinto de Queirós
