= Diogo Afonso =

15th-century Portuguese navigator

- Statue of Diogo Afonso in Mindelo

1st Captain of Santiago of Cape Verde (northern half)
- In office 1462 (or c. 1470) – 1473
- Preceded by: Office created
- Succeeded by: João Afonso (Johane)

Personal details
- Died: c. 1473
- Citizenship: Portugal
- Occupation: Navigator, colonial administrator

Diogo Afonso (died c. 1473) was a 15th-century Portuguese navigator and colonial administrator. A member of the household of Prince Henry the Navigator, he took part in voyages along the West African coast and is credited with the discovery of the western islands of Cape Verde, found while he was a squire of Infante Ferdinand, Duke of Viseu.

He was the first captain of the northern half of the island of Santiago, with its seat at Alcatrazes, and accountant (contador) of the House of Viseu in Madeira.

== Biography ==
=== Voyages on the African coast ===
Afonso took part in voyages of exploration along the West African coast sponsored by Prince Henry, of whose household he was a member.

In 1444, in command of a caravel, he is said to have sailed with Antão Gonçalves and Gomes Pires to the Río de Oro. Of the three caravels, those of Gonçalves and Afonso sailed in Prince Henry's service, while the third, a royal ship, was commanded by Gomes Pires, the king's patrão. According to the chronicle of Gomes Eanes de Zurara, they tried to draw the local Moors into trade but obtained only one captive; they returned with an elderly Moor who wished to meet the prince, while the squire João Fernandes chose to stay ashore to gather information.

The following year he took part in a three-caravel expedition under Antão Gonçalves, with Garcia Homem, sent to collect João Fernandes. After calling at Madeira, the ships sailed to Cabo Branco, where Afonso arrived first, and the captains then seized twenty-five inhabitants of the island of Arguin. When the fleet picked up João Fernandes, a local chief traded nine black captives and gold dust for goods of little value, and the place was recorded on charts as Cabo do Resgate. The fleet returned to Lisbon, where the captives were sold and Prince Henry received his fifth, according to Duarte Pacheco Pereira.

He may be the same Diogo Afonso, "servant of Prince Henry", whom King Afonso V appointed clerk (escrivão) of Redinha, near Pombal, on 31 January 1452. Redinha was then a commandery of the Order of Christ, under Prince Henry's authority. A Diogo Afonso was also appointed clerk of the excise of Sosa, in Vagos, and on 1 February 1452 clerk of the Redinha stud farm; the editors of the Monumenta Henricina note that appointments so close together suggest either that he held offices in both places or that two servants of the prince bore the same name.

Whether the navigator of the 1444 and 1445 voyages is the same Diogo Afonso who, as squire of Infante Ferdinand and later accountant in Madeira, discovered the western islands of Cape Verde is not agreed. (Note: The Dicionário de Personalidades edited by José Hermano Saraiva states that there is no consensus that they were the same person; the editors of the Monumenta Henricina identify the accountant of Madeira with the navigator mentioned by Zurara.)

=== Discovery of the western islands of Cape Verde ===
The western islands of Cape Verde are absent from the royal grant of 3 December 1460 but appear in that of 19 September 1462, which lists twelve islands: the five eastern islands found by Antonio de Noli and seven western islands whose discoverer it does not name. The same grant states that these seven were discovered by Infante Ferdinand, to whom the king had granted on 17 November 1457 whatever he might discover.

Afonso's name appears in a royal letter of Afonso V dated 29 October 1462, granting Infante Ferdinand an island west-north-west of the Canaries and Madeira "in the same manner as we have given him seven other islands which Diego Affomsso his squire found beyond Cape Verde".

The discovery of the seven western islands: Brava, São Nicolau, São Vicente, Santa Luzia, Santo Antão and the islets of Branco and Raso, is unanimously attributed to Diogo Afonso, who probably sighted them in late 1461 or early 1462.

=== Captain on Santiago and accountant in Madeira ===
The island of Santiago was divided into two captaincies: the southern one, based at Ribeira Grande (Cidade Velha), went to Antonio de Noli, and the northern one, based at Alcatrazes, to Diogo Afonso, from 1462 (or c. 1470). (Note: Hilarino da Luz links the division of Santiago to the start of its settlement in 1462, as Christiano José de Senna Barcellos had already done in 1899; Maria Barreto Dávila places it in the first years of the administration of Infanta Beatriz, which began in 1470, and notes that the earliest document linking Afonso to Santiago is a letter of 28 June 1472; Rute Dias Gregório considers the date unknown, except that it was before 1485.) The letters granting the two captaincies are lost, but later documents confirm that they went to Noli and Afonso. As on Terceira, the division created two centres of settlement and strengthened the House of Viseu's control over the island, as Noli was not one of Infanta Beatriz's trusted men. The northern captaincy soon declined, while the southern one prospered.

The settlement of Alcatrazes, founded by Afonso on arid high ground in what is now the parish of Nossa Senhora da Luz, in São Domingos, began to be abandoned from 1516, its inhabitants moving to Ribeira Grande and to the new town of Praia. Its last inhabitants left in 1770, a year of severe drought. By 15 October 1473 it was populous enough for Infanta Beatriz to appoint a Dominican, Friar João, as vicar of its church. Of the settlement only the Gothic church of Nossa Senhora da Luz remains, dated to 1480 and restored in 2020, the year the historic and archaeological site of Alcatrazes was classified as national heritage of Cape Verde.

A knight of the House of Viseu, Afonso served from at least January 1470 as the ducal accountant in Madeira, and so governed his captaincy from a distance. Although he spent time in Cape Verde, he did not live there permanently and appointed a deputy to govern in his name. A royal letter of 8 February 1472, concerning a complaint by Fernão Gomes about a ship fitted out in Madeira by the captain of Santiago, may refer to him. On 28 June 1472 Infanta Beatriz, widow of Infante Ferdinand and administrator of the House of Viseu, allowed him to be replaced by Gonçalo Anes da Velosa whenever he had to travel to the kingdom or to Santiago. By letters of 19 and 28 November 1472 she charged him with taking possession of Madeira in the name of the new duke, Diogo.

He probably died in early 1473. He was succeeded in the captaincy by his only son, João Afonso (Johane in the documents), for a few months and, after his death, by his nephew Rodrigo Afonso, vedor of Infanta Beatriz, who was already captain on 9 April 1473, when a royal letter granted him the privileges of the island's residents. As accountant in Madeira he was succeeded by Luís de Atouguia, sent to the island in May 1473. On 14 January 1485 Duke Manuel (later King Manuel I) confirmed the captaincy to Rodrigo Afonso "as Diogo Affomso held it, who was accountant of my island of Madeira; and on his death, Johane his son, now deceased"; the letter was the first to describe it as the "northern side", as the boundary between the two captaincies had never been drawn.

A letter of Afonso V of 17 August 1478 ordered that the 1,200,000 reais owed by Madeira for the defence of the kingdom in the War of the Castilian Succession be delivered to a Diogo Afonso, former servant of Prince Henry and accountant of the island, whose identification with the navigator is disputed. (Note: Dávila states that Diogo Afonso, accountant of Madeira since at least January 1470, probably died in early 1473, being succeeded in the captaincy by his son and, in April 1473, by his nephew Rodrigo Afonso; the editors of the Monumenta Henricina identify the navigator with the Diogo Afonso, former servant of Prince Henry and accountant of Madeira appointed by Infanta Beatriz from 1472, who appears repeatedly in the records of the Funchal town council and to whom the 1478 letter orders the tax to be delivered.)

== Legacy ==
On 21 May 1955, during the visit to Cape Verde of President Francisco Craveiro Lopes, a padrão (commemorative column) to Diogo Afonso was inaugurated on a hill above Mindelo overlooking the Porto Grande. The 4.5-metre column, topped by the cross of the Order of Christ, honours him as discoverer of São Vicente. The official account of the visit called him Diogo Afonso de Atouguia and dated his discoveries to São Nicolau on 6 December 1461, Santa Luzia on the 13th, Santo Antão on 17 January 1462 and São Vicente on 22 January 1462. These dates go back to Christiano José de Senna Barcellos, who in 1899 deduced them from the feast days of the saints after whom the islands are named, placing the sighting of São Nicolau and Santa Luzia in December 1461 and of Santo Antão and São Vicente in January 1462.

A statue of Diogo Afonso by the sculptor Gustavo Bastos, dated 1956, also stands in Mindelo, erected for the quincentenary of the discovery of the archipelago. In 1959 the poet Jorge Barbosa named it among the statues to which he invited Cape Verdeans to bring flowers in his poem "Meio Milénio", a critical review of five centuries of Portuguese presence written for the quincentenary celebrations of the discovery. Around independence in 1975 it was removed from public view, like the statue of Diogo Gomes in Praia; after the democratic transition of 1991 it was returned to a prominent place in Mindelo during the 1990s. It now stands at the southern end of Mindelo's seafront, near the former harbour master's building.

In Lisbon, a street in Alto do Restelo was named after him by a municipal edict of 15 March 1971. On Santo Antão, 17 January, the island's patron saint's day, marks its discovery and is a municipal holiday in Ribeira Grande and, since 2024, in Paul.

== Notes ==
Preceded by Office created	Captain of Santiago of Cape Verde (northern half); 1462 (or c. 1470) – 1473	Succeeded by João Afonso (Johane)
