= Manuel de Andrade =

Manuel de Andrade Fulano de Tal (b. in São Jorge), was a Portuguese journalist and jurist, trained as a lawyer, a profession he practiced in the municipality of Velas, São Jorge Island. He was editor of the newspaper Jorgense, which was published on the island.
