= Rodrigo Afonso =

15th-century Portuguese nobleman and colonial administrator

- 1st Lord of Belas

3rd Captain of Santiago of Cape Verde (northern half)
- Term: 1473 – 1504/1505
- Predecessor: João Afonso (Johane)
- Successor: Pêro Correia
- Died: between August 1504 and January 1505
- Offices: Vedor da fazenda of Infanta Beatriz
- Spouse: Beatriz Correia
- Issue: Pêro Correia; Estêvão Correia; Cristóvão Correia; Francisco Correia; Branca Correia
- Father: Luís Afonso de Atouguia
- Mother: Isabel Teles Correia
- Occupation: Nobleman, colonial administrator

Rodrigo Afonso, also known as Rodrigo Afonso de Atouguia (died 1504 or 1505), was a 15th-century Portuguese nobleman and colonial administrator. An officer of the House of Viseu, he was treasury clerk (escrivão da fazenda) to Infante Ferdinand and later treasurer (vedor da fazenda) to his widow, Infanta Beatriz. He was the first lord of Belas and held the revenues of Salvaterra de Magos.

A nephew of the navigator Diogo Afonso, he succeeded him in 1473, after the brief tenure of his cousin João Afonso, as captain of the northern half of the island of Santiago in Cape Verde, an office he held from Portugal until his death. In 1490 he also received a life grant of the wild cattle of the island of Boa Vista.

== Biography ==
=== Family ===
He was the second son of Luís Afonso de Atouguia and Isabel Teles Correia; his siblings included Lopo de Atouguia, who moved to Castile, and Leonor de Atouguia. He was a nephew of the navigator Diogo Afonso, discoverer of the western islands of Cape Verde and first captain of the northern half of Santiago.

=== In the service of the House of Viseu ===
A knight of the household of the Duke of Viseu and Beja, he was treasury clerk to Infante Ferdinand and, after Ferdinand's death in 1470, to his widow Infanta Beatriz, who administered the house on behalf of her sons and whose vedor da fazenda he later became. He was still the infanta's treasury clerk in October 1473, when he himself drafted the letters by which she sent a Dominican friar as vicar to his captaincy on Santiago. On 8 September 1482, at Moura, already a knight of the royal household and a member of the king's council, he represented Portugal at the ceremony in which, under the Terçarias of Moura agreement, Prince Manuel was handed over to the Bishop of Calahorra. On 19 June 1495 he also represented the infanta at a grant of land at Romeira Velha, near Almada.

On 13 January 1485 he received a life grant of the revenues, rights and dues of the town of Salvaterra de Magos and its district, which belonged to Infanta Beatriz, and of the Romão marshland, to pass on his death to his son Pêro Correia. (Note: Barcellos, Carvalho da Costa and Dutra call him lord of Salvaterra de Magos; Maria Odete Sequeira Martins states that he received only a life grant of the town's revenues, the town itself belonging to Infanta Beatriz.) On 13 August 1499 (or in 1501), in Lisbon, the infanta, who had lived at Belas and whose building works at the palace he had overseen, leased him for 40,000 reais a year the town of Belas with its jurisdiction and revenues, the palace, the estate (quinta), lands, orchards, mills and vineyards, together with farms at Chantaria and Loures and property in Carnide; she kept the patronage of the church, which she had given to the Convent of Our Lady of the Conception in Beja, and the Suímo mines. (Note: David Correia Sanches de Frias states that the infanta gave him the palace and estate of Belas and that he founded the entail in 1501, citing a document then in the archive of the Marquesses of Belas; the Sintra Municipal Archive's description of the Marqueses de Belas fonds states that she leased the estate to him in 1499 and that he founded the entail in his will of 16 January 1505, a date later than the royal letter of 3 January 1505 confirming the captaincy to his son on his death; Rui Miguel Marques dos Santos Rodrigues dates the gift to 1501 in one passage and to 1499 in another, citing for the latter the deed registered in the Leitura Nova; the same Sintra archive's description of the Câmara Municipal de Belas fonds dates the gift and the creation of the lordship to 1501; Maria Odete Sequeira Martins states that the infanta leased him the town on 13 August 1499 and that the property was later entailed.) Regarded as the first lord of Belas, he entailed the estate as a morgado in 1501 (or 1505), and it remained in his family; the direct lordship of the town and its rent were later given by the infanta to the chapel she founded in the Beja convent. He carried out new Renaissance-style works at the palace, including a walled courtyard with a balustrade, a domed pavilion bearing the arms of the Atouguia Correia and the main gateway; the complex, later known as the Quinta do Marquês, has been listed as a Property of Public Interest since 1943. The Atouguia arms, a gold cross and four fleurs-de-lis on a blue field within a gold border, with a gold lion as crest, appear on several armorial stones at the palace, including the one atop the column of the outer water tank. By 1485 he was the infanta's vedor da fazenda and a member of the king's council.

=== Captain on Santiago ===
Diogo Afonso probably died in early 1473; he was succeeded in the captaincy by his son João Afonso (Johane in the documents) for a few months and, after João's death, by Rodrigo Afonso, appointed by Infanta Beatriz. On 9 April 1473, at Évora, King Afonso V granted him the privileges of the island's residents: as he could not live there, being continually in the duke's service, Rodrigo Afonso undertook to keep an agent (feitor) and household in the town. He seems never to have visited the island, which he governed through that agent.

On 15 October 1473 the infanta appointed the Dominican Friar João as vicar of the part of the island of which Rodrigo Afonso was captain, whose revenues were leased to Fernão Gomes.

On 14 January 1485, at Montemor-o-Novo, Duke Manuel (later King Manuel I) confirmed the captaincy to him, now described as the "northern side", on the same terms as Diogo Afonso and João Afonso had held it. As the island had not yet been divided, the letter provided for its future demarcation. It gave him civil and criminal jurisdiction, except in cases of death or mutilation, which could be appealed to the king; the monopoly of grain mills, bread ovens and the sale of salt in his captaincy; a mark of silver a year for each water-powered sawmill; and the right to grant land, which reverted if not cultivated within five years. The captaincy was to pass to his eldest legitimate son. As king, Manuel confirmed his privileges on 27 October 1496 and the captaincy grant on 29 October 1497, both at Alenquer.

On the same day as the captaincy grant, the duke also gave him the soap monopoly (saboaria) of the whole island of Santiago, which he could run himself or lease out; the grant was confirmed by the king on 29 October 1496. In 1501 he lived in Lisbon, in the Rua do Ferregial near the Mártires church, and owned the caravel Santa Luzia, which sailed to Cape Verde.

=== Boa Vista ===
On 31 May 1490, at Évora, Duke Manuel granted him for life the wild cattle of the island of Boa Vista, which he could slaughter whenever he wished, paying the duke a tithe and a quarter of the hides, tallow and meat; on his death the cattle, houses and equipment were to revert to the duke, with no rights for his children or heirs. The grant, confirmed by the king in 1496, is the first official document to call the island Boa Vista instead of São Cristóvão; the island was then uninhabited. In August 1504 the Santa Luzia brought 1,047 hides from the island to Lisbon, of which the 340 due as the quarter and tithe were left in Rodrigo Afonso's hands.

=== Death and succession ===
He died between 15 August 1504, when he was still alive on the Santa Luzia's arrival in Lisbon, and 3 January 1505, when King Manuel confirmed the captaincy and its privileges to his eldest son, Pêro Correia, who like his father kept an agent on the island. In January 1505 the king also gave the son the soap monopoly of Santiago, "as Rodrigo Afonso his father, whom God keep, held it". Pêro Correia also succeeded him on Boa Vista.

== Marriage and issue ==
He married Beatriz Correia, daughter of Pêro Correia of Setúbal; on his marriage the infanta granted him 2,000 crowns, paying him an annual pension of 40,000 reais until the sum was paid. They had:

- Pêro Correia, lord of Salvaterra and Belas and captain of the northern half of Santiago, married to Urraca da Mina, daughter of Fernão Gomes, without issue;
- Estêvão Correia;
- Cristóvão Correia, knight of the Order of Santiago and commander of Colos, Alvalade and Vila Nova de Milfontes, who attended the order's general chapter at Santarém in 1477;
- Francisco Correia;
- Branca Correia, first wife of Diogo da Silveira.

== Notes ==
Preceded by Title created	Lord of Belas; 1499 (or 1501) – 1504/1505	Succeeded by Pêro Correia
Preceded by João Afonso (Johane)	Captain of Santiago of Cape Verde (northern half); 1473 – c. 1505	Succeeded by Pêro Correia
