= List of colonial governors of Cape Verde =

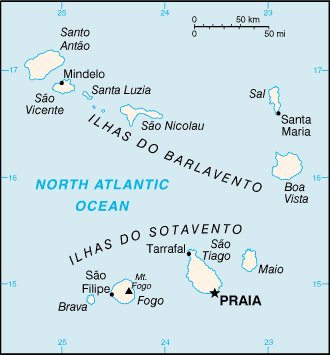
Map of Cape Verde.

Coat of arms of Portuguese Cape Verde

The islands of Cape Verde were uninhabited when discovered and claimed by Portugal in 1456. A Portuguese colony was established in 1462. The islands were united as a single crown colony in 1587. In 1951, the islands became an overseas province of Portugal. Autonomy was granted in 1974 and independence was granted on 5 July 1975.

== List ==
(Dates in italics indicate de facto continuation of office)

=== Santiago ===
(later northern Santiago)

Tenure	Incumbent	Notes
29 January 1462 to 1473	Diogo Afonso, Captain	
1473 to 1505	Rodrigo Afonso, Captain	

=== Ribeira Grande ===
(southern Santiago)

Tenure	Incumbent	Notes
19 September 1462 to 1496	António de Noli, Captain	
8 April 1497 to ????	Branca de Aguiar, Captain	♀
1508 to 15??	Sebastião Álvares de Landim, Captain	
1515 to 151?	Fernão Mendes, Captain	
1517 to 15??	João Alemão, Captain	
16 August 1536 to 15??	João Correia de Souza, Captain	
1544 to 15??	António Correia de Souza, Captain	
1555 (or ?1559) to 15??	Manuel de Andrade, Captain	
22 December 1562 to ????	Constantino de Bragança, Captain	

=== Boa Vista ===
Tenure	Incumbent	Notes
29 October 1497 to 3 January 1505	Rodrigo Afonso, Captain	
3 January 1505 to 15??	Pêro Correia, Captain	
15?? to 1542	António Correia, Captain	
1542 to 15??	Maria Correia, Captain	♀

=== Alcatrazes Islands ===
Tenure	Incumbent	Notes
1484 to ????	João de Santarém, Captain	
1504 to 150?	Afonso Ribeiro, Captain	
1508 to 15??	Rodrigi Varela, Captain	

=== Praia ===
Tenure	Incumbent	Notes
1526 to 1527	André Rodrigues dos Mosquitos, Captain	
1527 to 15??	Gomes Balieiro, Captain	
21 January 1570 to ????	Manuel Correia, Captain	

=== Fogo ===
Tenure	Incumbent	Notes
1528 to 1529	João de Meneses Vasconcellos, conde de Penela, Captain	
20 April 1528 to 15??	Afonso de Meneses, conde de Penela, Captain	

=== Sal, Santa Luzia and Brava ===
Tenure	Incumbent	Notes
22 October 1542 to 15??	Luís Pereira, Captain	
12 January 1553 to 15??	Martinho Pereira, Captain	

=== Santo Antão ===
Tenure	Incumbent	Notes
13 January 1548 to 15??	Gonçalo de Sousa, Captain	

=== The Islands of Cape Verde ===
Tenure	Incumbent	Notes
Portuguese suzerainty
1462	Portuguese settlement	
Corregedor (Magistrates)
1481 to ????	Pêro Lourenço, Corregedor	
???? to 1517	Pêro de Guimarães, Corregedor	
1517 to 1521	João Alemão, Corregedor	
1521 to 1527	Leonis Correia, Corregedor	
28 August 1527 to 1534	Gaspar da Videira, Corregedor	by assignement of king D.João III
1534 to 1536	Estêvão de Lagos, Corregedor	
1536 to 1541	André Feio, Corregedor	
1539 to 1541	Simão Afonso, Corregedor	
1541 to 1544	Pêro Moniz, Corregedor	
1544 to 1547	António Ferreira, Corregedor	
1547 to 1550	Pêro de Araujo, Corregedor	
1550 to 1556	Jorge Pimentel, Corregedor	
1556 to 1559	Manuel de Andrade, Corregedor	
1559 to 1560	Luís Martins de Evangelho, Corregedor	
1560 to 1562	Gregório Martins Caminha, Corregedor	
1562 to 1571	Bernardo de Alpoim, Corregedor	
1571 to 1577	António Velho Tinoco, Corregedor	
1577 to 1579	Cristóvão Soares de Mello, Corregedor	
1579 to 1584	Diogo Dias Magro, Corregedor	
1584 to 1588	Gaspar de Andrade, Corregedor	
1588 to 1588	Amador Gomes Raposo, Corregedor	
Governors
1588 to 1591	Duarte Lobo da Gama, Governor	
1591 to 1595	Brás Soares de Melo, Governor	
1597 to 1603	Fancisco Lobo da Gama, Governor	
1603 to 1606	Fernão de Mesquita de Brito, Governor	
1606 to 1611	Francisco Correia da Silva, Governor	
1611 to 1614	Francisco Martins de Sequeira, Governor	
1614 to 1618	Nicolau de Castilho, Governor	
1618 to 1622	Francisco de Moura, Governor	
1622 to 1622	Francisco de Moura Rolim, Governor	
1622 to 1624	Manuel Afonso de Guerra, acting Governor	
1624 to 1628	Francisco de Vasconcelos da Cunha, Governor	
1628 to 1632	João Pereira Corte-Real, Governor	
1632 to 1636	Cristóvão de Cabral, Governor	
1636 to 1639	Jorge de Castilho, Governor	
1639 to 1640	Jerónimo de Cavalcanti e Albuquerque, Governor	
1640 to 1645	João Serrão da Cunha, Governor	
1645 to 1646	Lourenço Garro, Governor	
1646 to 1648	Jorge de Araújo, Governor	
1648 to 1648	Roque de Barros do Rêgo, Governor	
1648 to 1649	Council of Government	
12 June 1649 to 9 October 1650	Gonçalo de Gamboa Ayala, Governor	
1650 to 1651	Pedro Semedo Cardoso, Governor	
1651 to 1653	Jorge de Mesquita Castelo Branco, Governor	
1563 to 1658	Pedro Ferreira Barreto, Governor	
1558 to 1663	Francisco de Figueroa, Governor	
1663 to 1667	Antõnio Galvao, Governor	
1667 to 1671	Manuel da Costa Pessoa, Governor	1st Term
1671 to 1676	Manuel Pacheco de Melo, Governor	
30 April 1676 to 1676	João Cardoso Pássaro, Governor	
1676 to 1678	Council of Government	
15 March 1678 to 1683	Manuel da Costa Pessoa, Governor	2nd Term
1681 to 1687	Inácio de Franca Barbosa, Governor	
1687 to 1688	Veríssimo Carvalho da Costa, Governor	
1688 to 1690	Vitoriano da Costa, Governor	
1690 to 1691	Digo Ramires Esquível, Governor	
1691 to 1692	Council of Government	
1692 to 1696	Manuel António Pinheiro da Câmara, Governor	
1696 to 7 June 1696	António Gomes Mena, Governor	
1696 to 1698	Council of Government	
4 November 1698 to 1702	António Salgado, Governor	
10 February 1702 to 1702	Jorge Cotrim de Mello, Governor	
12 April 1702 to 1707	Gonçalo de Lemos Mascarenhas, Governor	
11 May 1707 to 1710	Rodrigo de Oliveira da Fonseca, Governor	
12 February 1710 to 1715	José Pinheiro da Câmara, Governor	
27 March 1715 to 20 June 1715	Manuel Pereira Calheiros e Araújo, Governor	
16 December 1715 to 1719	Serafim Teixeira Sarmento de Sá, Governor	
9 April 1719 to 1720	Balthasar de Sousa Coutinho, Governor	
11 March 1720 to 4 January 1725	António Vieira, Governor	
24 January 1726 to 1728	Francisco Miguel da Nóbrega Vasconcelos, Governor	
10 July 1728 to 1733	Francisco de Oliveira Grans, Governor	
1733 to 1737	Bento Gomes Coelho, Governor	
1 May 1736 to 7 August 1738	José da Fonseca Barbosa, Governor	
1738 to 1741	Chamber Senate	
10 June 1741 to 1751	João Zuzarte de Santa Maria, Governor	
6 March 1751 to 1751	António José d'Eça e Faria, Governor	
1752 to 1756	Luís António da Cunha d'Eça, Governor	
1756 to 1761	Manuel António de Sousa e Meneses, Governor	
5 March 1761 to 1761	Marcelino Pereira de Ávila, Governor	
1761 to 1764	António de Barros Bezerra, Governor	
1764 to 1766	Bartolomeu de Sousa de Brito Tigre, Governor	
1766 to 1767	João Jácome de Brito Barena Henriques, Governor	
25 November 1768 to 1777	Joaquim Salema Saldanha Lobo, Governor	
1777 to 1781	António do Vale de Sousa e Meneses, Governor	
19 February 1781 to 1782	Duarte de Melo da Silva Castro de Almeida, Governor	
1782 to 1783	Francisco de São Simão, acting Governor	
23 August 1784 to 1789	António Machado de Faria e Maia, Governor	
2 April 1789 to 1793	Francisco José Teixeira Carneiro, Governor	
27 September 1793 to 10 September 1795	José da Silva Maldonado d'Eça, Governor	
3 August 1796 to 29 November 1802	Marcelino António Bastos, Governor	
12 May 1803 to 1818	António Coutinho de Lencastre, Governor	
6 February 1818 to 1822	António Pusich, Governor	
9 May 1822 to 1826	João da Matta Chapuzet, Governor	
7 September 1826 to 1830	Caetano Procópio Godinho de Vasconcelos, Governor	
1830 to 1831	Duarte da Costa e Sousa de Macedo, Governor	
1831 to 1834	José Coutinho de Lencastre, Governor	
1834 to 1835	Manuel António Martins, Governor	
1835 to 1836	Joaquim Pereira Marinho, Governor	1st Term
1836 to 1837	Domingos Correia Arouca, Governor	
1837 to 1839	Joaquim Pereira Marinho, Governor	2nd Term
1839 to 1842	João de Fontes Pereira de Melo, Governor	1st Term
5 April 1842 to 1845	Francisco de Paula Bastos, Governor	
26 June 1845 to 1847	José Miguel de Noronha, Governor	
28 July 1847 to 1851	João de Fontes Pereira de Melo, Governor	2nd Term
25 June 1851 to 1854	Fortunato José Barreiros, Governor	
6 April 1854 to 1857	António Maria Barreiros Arrobas, Governor	
25 November 1857 to 1860	Sebastião Lopes de Calheiros Meneses, Governor	
1860 to 1860	Januário Correia de Almeida, Governor	
6 September 1860 to 1863	Carlos Joaquim Franco, Governor	
1863 to 1869	José Guedes de Carvalho e Meneses, Governor	
29 March 1869 to 26 February 1876	Caetano Alexandre de Almeida e Albuquerque, Governor	Some sources stated that he began his term on 11 February 1869
1877 to 1877	G.C. Lopes de Macedo, Governor	
1878 to 1878	Vasco Guedes de Carvalho e Meneses, Governor	
1879 to 1881	António de Nascimento Pereira de Sampaio, Governor	
1882 to 1886	João Paes de Vasconcellos, Governor	
1887 to 1889	João Cesário de Lacerda, Governor	1st Term
1890 to 1890	Augusto Cesário Carlos de Carvalho, Governor	
1891 to 1893	José Guedes Brandão de Melo, Governor	1st Term
1893 to 1894	Fernando de Magalhães e Menezes, Governor	
1893 to 1896	José Guedes Brandão de Melo, Governor	2nd Term
1897 to 1897	Alexandre Alberto da Rocha de Serpa Pinto, Governor	
1898 to 1900	João Cesário de Lacerda, Governor	2nd Term
1901 to 1902	Arnaldo de Novalis Guedes de Rebelo, Governor	
1902 to 1903	Francisco de Paula Cid, Governor	
1903 to 1904	António Alfredo Barjona de Freitas, Governor	
1905 to 1907	Amâncio Alpoim de Cerqueira Borges Cabral, Governor	
1907 to 1909	Bernardo António da Costa de Macedo, Governor	
1909 to 1910	Martinho Pinto de Queirós Montenegro, Governor	
1910 to 1911	António de Macedo Ramalho Ortigão, Governor	
1911 to 1911	Artur Marinha de Campos, Governor	
1911 to 1915	Joaquím Pedro Vieira Índice Bicker, Governor	
1915 to 1918	Abel Fontoura da Costa, Governor	
1918 to 1919	Teófilo Duarte, Governor	
1919 to 1921	Manuel Firmino de Almeida da Maia Magalhães, Governor	
1921 to 1922	Filipe Carlos Dias de Carvalho, Governor	
1924 to 1926	Júlio Henriques d'Abreu, Governor	
1927 to 1927	João de Almeida, Governor	
1927 to 1931	António Álvares Guedes Vaz, Governor	
1931 to 1941	Amadeu Gomes de Figueiredo, Governor	
1941 to 1943	José Diogo Ferreira Martins, Governor	
1943 to 1949	João de Figueiredo, Governor	
1950 to 1953	Carlos Alberto Garcia Alves Roçadas, Governor	
1953 to 1957	Manuel Marques de Abrantes Amaral, Governor	
1957 to 1958	António Augusto Peixoto Correia, acting Governor	
1958 to 1962	Silvino Silvério Marques, Governor	
1963 to 1969	Leão Maria Tavares Rosado do Sacramento Monteiro, Governor	
13 March 1969 to 1974	António Lopes dos Santos, Governor	
March 1974 to 25 April 1974	Basílio Pina de Oliveira Seguro, Governor	
May 1974 to July 1974	Sérgio Fonseca, Governor	
6 August 1974 to 21 September 1974	Henrique da Silva Horta, Governor	
21 September 1974 to 30 December 1974	Vicente Almeida d'Eça, Governor	
30 December 1974 to 5 July 1975	Vicente Almeida d'Eça, High Commissioner	
5 July 1975	Independence as Republic of Cape Verde	

For continuation after independence, see: List of presidents of Cape Verde

== See also ==
- Politics of Cape Verde
- List of presidents of Cape Verde
- List of prime ministers of Cape Verde
