= Jorge Álvares Foundation =

Portuguese Foundation

- Fundação Jorge Álvares
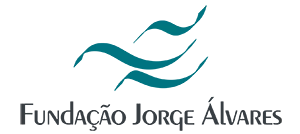
- Named after: Jorge Álvares
- Formation: 14 December 1999; 26 years ago
- Founded at: Avenida Miguel Bombarda, n.º 133, 4.º andar, letra I, Lisbon
- Type: Foundation
- Legal status: nonprofit organization with of public utility status
- Purpose: cultural, educational, scientific, social
- Headquarters: Rua Castilho, 39 (Edifício Castil) – 11º Andar – Letra I, Lisbon
- Location: Lisbon, Portugal
- Coordinates: 38.72293°N 9.1519617°W
- Official language: Portuguese
- President: Maria Celeste Hagatong
- Board of directors: Maria Celeste Hagatong, Maria Alexandra Gomes, Fernanda Ilhéu, Rui Soares Santos (2022-2028)
- Website: jorgealvares.com

Jorge Álvares Foundation is a non-profit organization with public utility status established in Lisbon on 14 December 1999. It was recognized by the Portuguese government in 2002, and received its public utility status in 2004. It received its initial funding from the Fundação para a Cooperação e o Desenvolvimento de Macau (MOP 50 million) and Stanley Ho (MOP 100 million).

The foundation is named after Jorge Álvares, credited as the first European to have reached China by sea during the Age of Discovery. According to its by-laws, it takes as its purpose the development of cultural, educational, scientific, artistic, and social activities that promote an intercultural dialogue resulting from the specificity of Macau and multicentury Portuguese presence in this territory. In addition, it intends to support Portuguese institutions that promote the study and promotion of Macau, as well as activities related to the Macanese diaspora.
