= Raso =

Raso may refer to:

== People ==
- Angelo Raso (born 1981), Italian football player
- Chiara Raso (born 1981), Italian ski mountaineer
- Frank Raso
- Hayley Raso (born 1994), Australian football player
- Mark Raso, Canadian filmmaker
- Marko Rašo (born 1989), Croatian football player
- Michael Raso (born 1980), Italian cricket player
- Momčilo Rašo (born 1997), Montenegrin football player
- Rašo Babić (born 1977), Serbian football player
- Rašo Vučinić (born 1982), Serbian bobsledder and politician
- Gennaro Raso (born 1959), Italian-Canadian biker

== Places ==
- Cabo Raso, Portugal
- Ilhéu Raso, Cape Verde

== Other ==
- Rasa (literary form), a form of Gujarati literature also spelled Raso
- Raso lark, Cape Verde
