= Duarte Lôbo da Gama =

Duarte Lôbo da Gama was the first captain-general of Portuguese Cape Verde, from 7 August 1587 to 25 March 1591.

== Bibliography ==
- História de Portugal - Dicionário de Personalidades (vol. XV) ISBN 989-554-120-1

Preceded by	Colonial Governor of Cape Verde; 1587-91	Succeeded by Brás Soares de Melo
