= Pero Escobar =

15th-century Portuguese navigator

Effigy of Pero Escobar in the Monument of the Discoveries, in Lisbon, Portugal.

Pero Escobar, also known as Pedro Escobar, was a 15th-century Portuguese navigator who discovered São Tomé (December 21, 1471), Annobón (January 1, 1472), Príncipe (January 17, 1472) islands, together with João de Santarém c. 1470. He is then recorded sailing with Diogo Cão on his first voyage in 1482, and as the pilot of the famous Bérrio caravel on Vasco da Gama's first expedition in 1497 to sail directly from Europe to India. He was also on Pedro Álvares Cabral's discovery of Brazil in 1500.

In 1471, working in the service of Lisbon merchant Fernão Gomes, who had a concession for the exploration and trade in the Gulf of Guinea, Pedro Escobar helped to discover the gold industry that would grow around Elmina in 1471.
