= Fernão Gomes =

15th-century Portuguese merchant and explorer of Africa

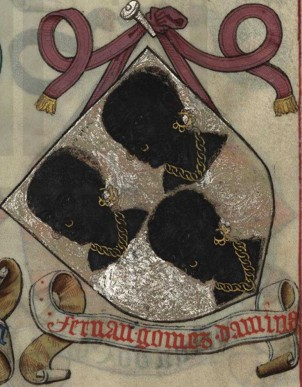
Coat of arms of Fernão Gomes da Mina in the Livro do Armeiro-Mor

Fernão Gomes (15th century), also known as Fernão Gomes da Mina, was a Portuguese merchant and explorer from Lisbon, possibly the son of Tristão Gomes de Brito.

In 1469, King Afonso V of Portugal granted him the monopoly of trade in the Gulf of Guinea. Besides the payment of an annual rent of 200,000 reais, Gomes was to explore 100 leagues of the coast of Africa per year, for five years (later the agreement would be extended for another year). He also received a monopoly of trade in guinea pepper for another yearly payment of 100,000 reais (then called "malagueta", it was a popular substitute for black pepper).

Gomes employed explorers João de Santarém, Pedro Escobar, Lopo Gonçalves, Fernão do Pó and Pedro de Sintra, He exceeded the requirements of his grant: his expeditions reached the Cape of Santa Catarina, already in the Southern Hemisphere, and also the islands of the Gulf of Guinea.

In 1471 they reached Elmina (meaning "the Mine"), where they found a thriving alluvial gold trade. With the substantial revenues he got, especially the trade of his warehouse in Mina, he became known as "Fernão Gomes da Mina" in 1474. With his profits from African trade, Fernão Gomes assisted the Portuguese king in the conquests of Asilah, Alcácer Ceguer, and Tangier in Morocco, where he was knighted. Later, in 1478, gathering honors and with an enormous influence on the economy of the kingdom, he was appointed to the royal council.

Given the large profits, in 1482 new King John II of Portugal ordered a factory to be built in Elmina, to manage the local gold industry: Elmina Castle.

Gomes married Catarina Leme, an illegitimate child of the Flemish-Portuguese merchant Martim Leme. Martin Leme was the son of Martin Lems and his noble Portuguese wife Joana Barroso. They had two children. Catarina Leme married João Rodrigues Pais. Nuno Fernandes da Mina married Isabel Queimado and Violante de Brito.
