= Ecclesiastical fief =

Medieval fief held from the Catholic Church

In the feudal system of the European Middle Ages, an ecclesiastical fief, held from the Catholic Church, followed all the laws laid down for temporal fiefs. The suzerain, e.g. bishop, abbot, or other possessor, granted an estate in perpetuity to a person, who thereby became his vassal.

As such, the grantee at his enfeoffment did homage to his overlord, took an oath of fealty, and made offering of the prescribed money or other object, by reason of which he held his fief. These requirements had to be repeated as often as there was a change in the person of the suzerain or vassal. These fiefs were granted by churchmen to princes, barons, knights, and others, who thereupon assumed the obligation of protecting the church and domains of the overlord.

== Features of the system ==
This system of feudal tenure was not always restricted to lands, as church revenues and tithes were often farmed out to secular persons as a species of ecclesiastical fief. Strictly speaking, however, a fief was usually defined as immovable property whose usufruct perpetually conceded to another under the obligation of fealty and personal homage. A fief was not ecclesiastical simply because its overlord was a churchman; it was requisite also that the domain granted should be church property. Lands, which belonged to the patrimony of an ecclesiastic, became a secular fief if he bestowed them on a vassal.

All fiefs were personal and hereditary, and many of the latter could be inherited by female descent.

== Passive fiefs ==
Fiefs bestowed by the Church on vassals were called active fiefs; when churchmen themselves undertook obligations to a suzerain, the fiefs were called passive. In the latter case, temporal princes gave certain lands to the Church by enfeoffing a bishop or abbot, and the latter had then to do homage as pro-vassal and undertake all the implied obligations. When these included military service, the ecclesiastic was empowered to fulfil this duty by a substitute.

It was as passive fiefs that many bishoprics, abbacies, and prelacies, as to their temporalities, were held of kings in the medieval period, and the power thereby acquired by secular princes over elections to ecclesiastical dignities led to the strife over investitures. These passive fiefs were conferred by the suzerain investing the newly elected churchman with crozier and ring at the time of his making homage, but the employment of these symbols of spiritual power gradually paved the way to claims on the part of the secular overlords (see Investiture Conflict).

== Papal fiefs ==
Papal fiefs included not only individual landed estates, however vast, but also duchies, principalities, and even kingdoms. When the pope enfeoffed a prince, the latter did homage to him as to his liege lord, and acknowledged his vassalage by an annual tribute. Pope Pius V (29 March 1567) decreed that, in future, fiefs belonging strictly to the Patrimony of St. Peter should be incorporated into the Papal States whenever the vassalage lapsed, and that no new enfeoffment take place.

Turning a state into a papal fief was a clever political move that allowed a kingdom to ensure its independence in face of stronger or threatening Catholic enemies. At the Iberian Peninsula, except for the dominant León and Castile, kingdoms such as Navarre, Portugal, and Aragon were all Papal vassals. Afonso Henriques, after successfully rebelling his county out of the Kingdom of Leon, put his new Kingdom of Portugal under papal vassalage, represented by an annual symbolic tribute of four ounces of gold. In some circumstances, however, such as the Aragonese Crusade, the vassalage gave justification for the Pope to depose a king whenever he thought useful to do so.

King John of England declared that he held his realm as a fief from the Pope in 1213, and King James II of Aragon accepted the same relation for Sardinia and Corsica in 1295. England remained a rather erratic Papal Fief until 1365, when the Parliament concluded John's surrender of domains to the Papacy to be invalid. England was then in a precarious position, siding with Rome during the Western Schism alongside the Plantagenet succession to Capetian France, whilst their Valois opponents in the Hundred Years' War supported the Avignon Papacy, so this resolution avoided a conflict of interests.

The most famous papal fief, the Kingdom of Sicily, sprang from investitures of 1059 and 1269. When the kingdom split due to the Sicilian Vespers, Sicily came under Aragonese control, but the Kingdom of Naples remained a Papal fief, paying the annual Chinea tribute until 1855. Compare Terra Mariana, the lands in Livonia considered directly subject to the Holy See from 1215.

The Lordship of Ireland was for centuries considered a papal fief of the King of England, granted to Henry II of England by Pope Adrian IV by the 1155 bull Laudabiliter. When Henry VIII of England broke away from the Papacy, the Lordship was elevated to the condition of Kingdom, thus thwarting the idea he held such domain under papal behalf.

The Duchy of Parma and Piacenza was created in 1545 for the son of Pope Paul III, Pier Luigi Farnese. Suzerainty over the duchy was disputed between the Papacy and the Holy Roman Emperor for the next two centuries, until in 1731 with the extinction of the House of Farnese, Papal claims were ignored and the duchy passed to the House of Bourbon-Parma.
