= António de Noli =

Genoese nobleman and navigator

Antonio de Noli (born 1415 or possibly 1419) was a 15th-century Genoese nobleman and navigator, and the first governor of the earliest European overseas colony in Subsaharan Africa. He discovered some of the Cape Verde islands on behalf of Henry the Navigator and was made the first Governor of Cape Verde by King Afonso V. In most history or geographic books, including ancient chronicles, or encyclopedias, he is referred as Antonio de Noli. (Note: "A carta regia (royal letter) of September 19, 1462, attributed the discovery of the Cape Verde Islands to the Italian Antonio de Noli". In Bailey W. Diffie & George D. Winius, "Foundations of the Portuguese Empire 1415–1580". University of Minnesota Press, 1977. Page 106) In Italy, he is known also as Antonio da Noli (Note: As the name Antonio da Noli implies that he was born in Noli, vice versa, it is assumed that he was born in Noli because his name would be Antonio da Noli (as da would denote procedence). Emanuele Diotto, in Antonio da Noli e la scoperta delle isole del Capo Verde quotes City of Noli historian Bernardo Gandoglia as referring the existence of a birth document with the name Antonio da Noli. However there is no indicated reference or source for such document. Further, in his book In Repubblica (1916. 696 pages) Bernardo Gandoglia refers the issue of Antonio Noli being from Noli as ″so it is believed″ (cosi si crede). In a brief mention to Antonio Noli Gandoglia writes ″il nostro Antonio (cosi si crede) ò a Genova, ove piu tarde si trovò compromesso nelle fazione fra gli Adorno e i Fregoso″. Further, the original reports on Antonio da Noli, as indication of locus-origin, may as well have referred to the hamlet of Noli in Northern Genoa province (La frazione di Noli al comune di Serra Ricco), then a site of the de Noli family) or sometimes as Antoniotto Usodimare.

== Biography ==
Antonio de Noli was born to a patrician family in Genoa, Italy, as referred in ancient sources of the epoch; e.g. Portuguese king's historian João de Barros stated already in 1552 that Antonio Noli was born in Genoa, and "of noble blood". Modern historians and researches also specify Antonio Noli as Genovese or Genoese, e.g. Dumoriez (1762), Thomas (1860), Hamilton (1975), Diffie and Winius (1977), Irwin and Wilson (1999). It has also been put forward that Antonio de Noli would have instead born in Noli (Savona) Italy. After he was exiled from Genoa amid political disputes compromising main families Fregoso and Adorno, Antonio de Noli (Navy captain, and cartography expert) sailed to Portugal c. 1447 in command of a small expedition of three vessels and with his brother Bartholomew (a Genoa lawyer) and nephew Raphael. In Portugal, de Noli became engaged in Ultramar explorations by Henry the Navigator. From 1462 to 1496, he founded and then was Captain of Ribeira Grande (modern-day Cidade Velha) at the southern end of Santiago Island.

The de Noli family is believed to have its ancient roots in "the small city and Castle of Noli". By the 14th century, there were two main branches of the Noli family in Northern Italy sharing a pre-medieval origin in the ancient territory of Noli (Savona province). One branch was established in Genoa, Liguria, and the other in Novara, Piedmont, where the Noli ("famiglia di signore") inhabited the Castle of Cameriano by the beginning of the 15th century. It is also recorded that members of the Noli family established in Genoa participated in government already by the 13th century, i.e. as "Consigliere della Signoria" in 1261. In 1382, Giacomo de Noli, ancestor of Captain Antonio de Noli, was appointed one member of the Twelve-Elderly Council of Genoa ("XII-Anziani del Comune") under the lead of Duke Nicolas de Guarco. When Nicolas de Guarco took over the rule of Genoa after the Fregoso, in 1378, he had "appointed in positions of trust the noblemen which have been neglected in the previous administrations", and thus also appointed the Fieschi. The participation of the de Noli in the Guarco's ruling of Genoa in alliance with the Fieschi would have, years afterwards, dramatic consequences for Antonio de Noli and his brother Bartholomew. Those prior political associations of the de Noli in Genoa provide a helpful background in explaining both their forced departure to exile in Portugal in 1447, and also the circumstances around the later repatriation of their descendants some decades after, first in Cesena and finally anew in homeland Genoa.

== Discoveries ==
Old history records attribute to Antonio de Noli the discovery of Cape Verde Islands, supposedly "the ancient Hesperides of Pliny and Ptolemy". This according to a carta regia (royal letter) of 19 September 1462. It is uncertain which of the Cape Verde Islands were discovered by Antonio de Noli. Some of the islands are mentioned in a letter of donation dated 3 December 1460; the rest in the above-mentioned from 19 September 1462. Noli has claim to discovering the first set of islands, while the second were possibly found by Diogo Gomes. However, the events in question are poorly recorded in documents from the time, a reasonable alternative would be that some or all of these second set of islands were discovered by Diogo Dias, Diogo Afonso and Alvise Cadamosto.

The official royal letter of 29 October 1462 states that it was Diogo Afonso, the king's scribe, who had discovered the other (last) seven islands that were mentioned in the royal letter of 19 September 1462. The 19 September 1462 letter grants all the islands of Cape Verde to Dom Fernando and the other seven islands are designated but the discoverer is not named. In this letter, Antonio de Noli's name is given as the discoverer of the first five islands, being also the first time he is mentioned by name as the discoverer. The letter of 3 December 1460 was a royal grant to Infante Ferdinand the Saint Prince after the demise of his brother Henry the Navigator in 1460.

== Descendants ==
Governor Antonio de Noli had one daughter (Dona Branca de Aguiar, who married the Portuguese nobleman Dom Jorge Correia de Sousa, fidalgo da casa real) and one son, who is mentioned to have accompanied him during the early exploration years in mainland Africa. During the occupation of Cape Verde Islands by Castile (a main base of modern Spain) during the Portuguese-Castilian war of 1475–1479, the Italian Antonio de Noli remained governor in spite of his titles had been given to him by the Portuguese. In the aftermath of the Treaty of Alcáçovas in 1479 and the reestablishment of Portuguese rule, the governorship of the Islands went instead to Noli's daughter Branca and her Portuguese spouse. Thereafter, no records of the whereabouts on Antonio Noli – including his demise or location of his son and descendants, or his fortune (as well as in the case of his Genoa brother Bartholomew or nephew Raphael) – have been found in Portugal, Cape Verde, or Spain. In 1497, the Noli were still banned from returning to Italy via Genoa for political reasons.

In 2008, several manuscripts indicating the presence of the de Noli family in Cesena by the end of 1400 and not earlier, was found at the Biblioteca Malatestiana in Cesena, Italy. Among the Malatestiana Library manuscripts, two separate documents depicting the coat of arms of the Noli family were also found. In one of these manuscripts, "Famiglia Noli oriunda" was written under the Noli coat of arms. The reference to "oriunda" in this context means "not from Cesena", thus "coming from an outer territory". The first entry of the de Noli in the Cesena manuscripts refers to "Simone de Antonio Noli Biondi", which indicates, according to naming praxis at the time, that Antonio Noli was his father. Later, and with the name Simone de Noli Biondi, he is mentioned in another manuscript as a member of the Cesena Council (Consiglio di Cesena) in 1505. The same position was held in later years by two other de Noli descendants, Antonio Noli of Tregga rotta in 1552 and Antonio de Noli Biondi in 1556. This Antonio de Noli ceased to be a member of the Cesena Council in 1558 and afterwards the family de Noli was reported in a Malatestiana manuscript as "extinct" in Cesena. However, a few years later, descendants of an Antonio de Noli appeared again, living in Northern Genoa (Valleregia, Serra Ricco). The first register of the de Noli in the Family book of Valleregia Parish of the period took place in 1586. The entries show the names of Antonio de Noli, Bartholomew, Simone, Raphael, and others known names used already in the previous generation of navigator Antonio de Noli and his descendants. The descendants of the de Noli family established anew in the hamlet of Noli in Northern Genoa (La frazione di Noli al comune di Serra Ricco). Like most of the de Noli families with Ligurian ancestry, the coat of arms of the family of Antonio de Noli and his descendants carries the red and white colours of the ancient cities of Noli and Genoa.

== Legacy ==
During World War II, an Italian destroyer was named Antonio da Noli. It sank after striking a mine off the coast of Corsica on 9 September 1943, the day after the Italian surrender to the Allies (see Navigatori class destroyer).

== References and notes ==
- Antonio de Noli and the Beginning of the New World Discoveries – Libertarian Books Europe "Antonio de Noli and the Beginning of the New World Discoveries" (2013), Ed. Prof. Marcello Ferrada de Noli, Libertarian Books Europe, ISBN 978-91-981615-0-2
- Cabo Verde (Cape Verde), "Cape Verde" at worldstatesmen.org
- , "Events of 1943" at comandosupremo.com
- Famiglia De Noli 1586, "De Noli, The Italian Bond", Prof M. Ferrada de Noli
