= Corregedor =

The Corregedor (Inspector-General or Magistrate) was a position established by the Portuguese crown in the 14th-15th century, with the authority to "correct" acts of a local, administrative or judicial nature within the kingdom. Although common throughout the kingdom, the role was more common and important in the administration of the Azores.

== History ==
The King of Portugal had by ordination, in the entire kingdom, the right to send important authorities, in his name, to correct the acts at all levels of the local administration and judiciary. To this end, since he was unable to participate directly, he established the post of Corregedor.

The first Corregedor with jurisdiction over the Azores, Dr. Afonso de Matos, was nominated by King Manuel I of Portugal in 1503. Part of his obligation was that he was required to visit the Azores once per year, at the expense of the local authorities.

After 1535, King John established a time frame for corrections to be made in each island of the Azores, and by each Captaincy. In that statement, a four-month plan was established specifically for the islands of São Jorge, Graciosa, Faial, Pico and Flores, the islands of Santa Maria and São Miguel established a specific working division and, the island of Terceira alone. In special circumstances, the Corregedor could visit each island for longer stays.

== Role ==
The Corregedor in the Azores was the most important judicial magistrate, judging at the second tier, providing appeals and conflicts between presiding judges and ouvidors (the counsels, of the Captains-General). The royal edict of 1767 established the predominance of the Corregedor, recognizing his power to judge appeals, something that the Corregedors on the continent were not permitted to do. In this role, the Corregedor could suspend the jurisdiction or their powers to judge, during his visit. Similarly, the Corregedor was responsible for inspecting the functioning of the Municipal authorities (Portuguese: Câmaras Municipais) and audit the books of the public finances.
