= João de Santarém =

15th century Portuguese explorer

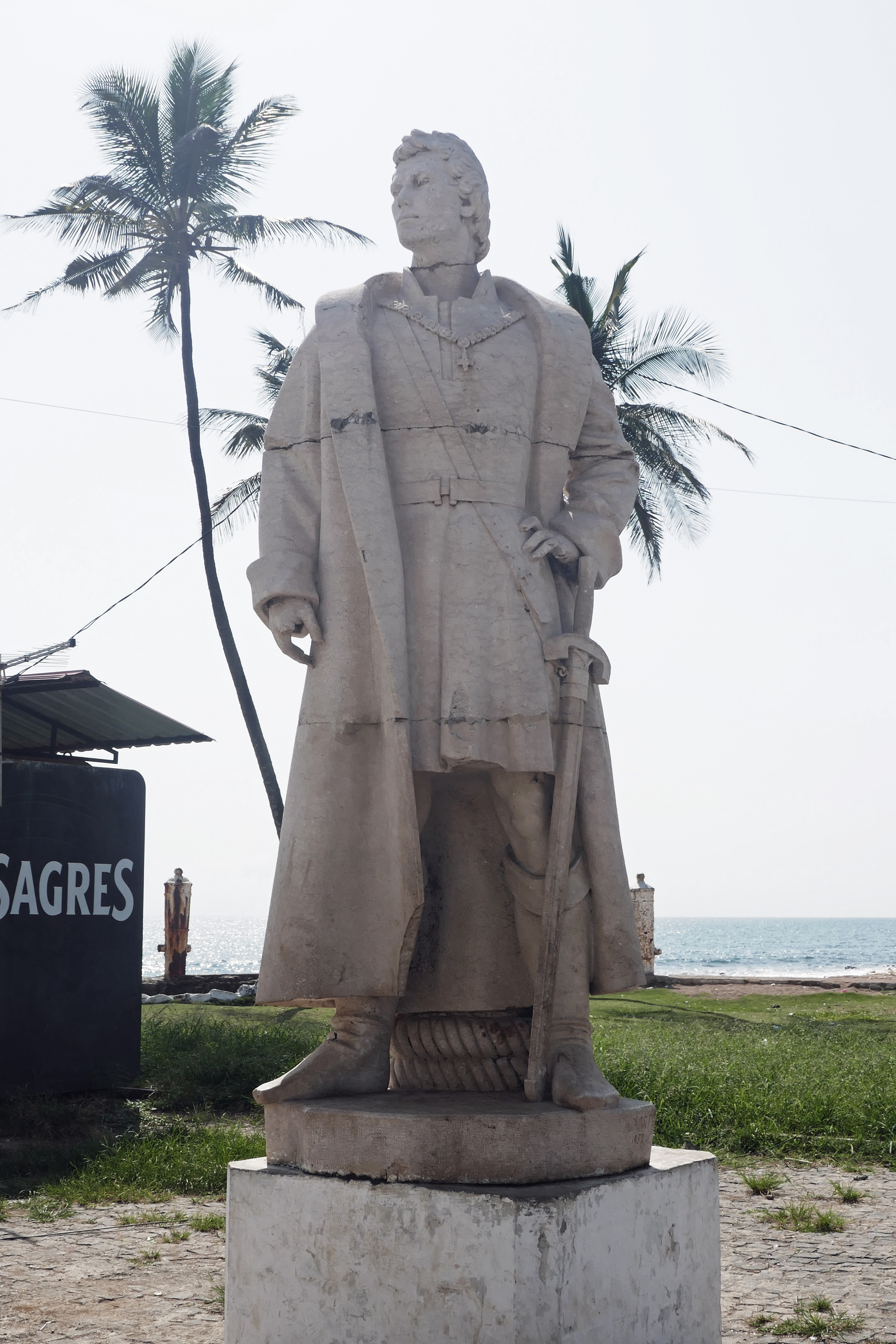
João de Santarém

João de Santarém (15th century) was a Portuguese explorer who discovered São Tomé (in December 21, 1471), Annobón (in January 1472) and Príncipe (January 17, 1472), and hence became the first known European to reach the Southern Hemisphere. Together with Pero Escobar, he also encountered the town of Sassandra in the Ivory Coast in 1471 and 1472, explored the African land from Ghana up to the Niger Delta. From 1484 he was captain of Alcatrazes (around Santiago or Brava) in Cape Verde.

In January 1471, João de Santarém and Pero de Escobar discovered "the traffic of gold at the place we now call Mina" (present-day Elmina).

== See also ==
- European exploration of Africa § Portuguese expeditions
