= Portuguese Cape Verde =

1462–1975 Portuguese colony in the Cape Verde Islands

Coordinates: 14.92°N 23.51°W

Overseas Province of Cape Verde Província Ultramarina de Cabo Verde (Portuguese)
- 1462–1975
- Flag (1910–1975) Coat of arms (1951–1975)
- Anthem: "Hymno Patriótico" (1808–26); Patriotic Anthem "Hino da Carta" (1826–1910); Hymn of the Charter "A Portuguesa" (1910–75); The Portuguese
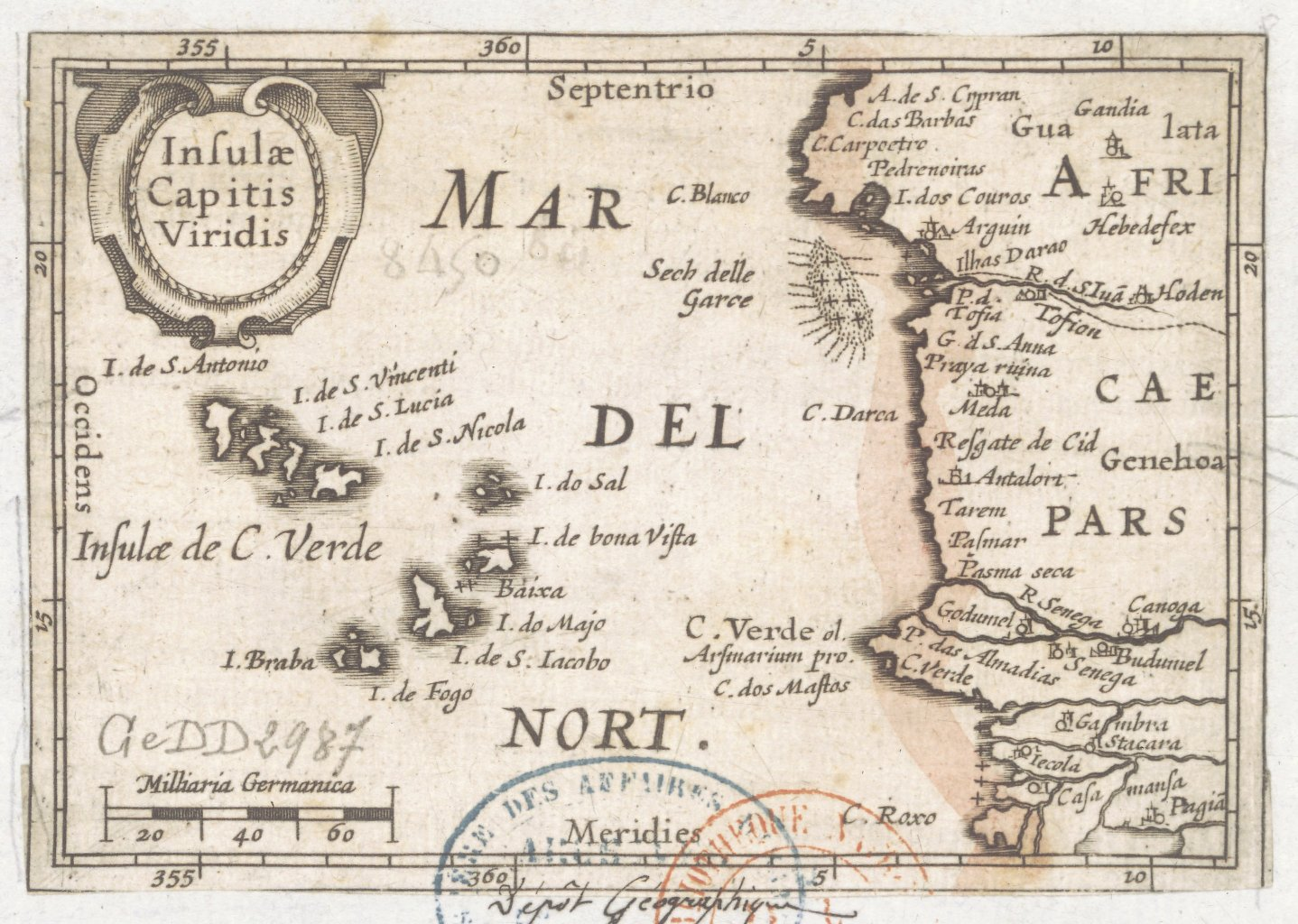
- Status: Colony; Overseas province of the Portuguese Empire
- Capital: Praia
- Common languages: Portuguese
- Head of state
  - 1462–1481 (first): Afonso V
  - 1974–1975 (last): F. da Costa Gomes
- Governor
  - 1588–1591 (first): D. Lôbo da Gama
  - 1974–1975 (last): V. Almeida d'Eça
- Historical era: Imperialism
  - Established: 1462
  - Independence: 5 July 1975
- Currency: Cape Verdean real (until 1914); Cape Verdean escudo (from 1914)
- ISO 3166 code: CV
Preceded by	Succeeded by
Uninhabited Cape Verde	Cape Verde
- Today part of: Cape Verde

Portuguese Cape Verde (Portuguese: Cabo Verde Português) was a colony of the Portuguese Empire from the initial settlement of the Cape Verde islands in 1462 until 1975, when independence was granted by Portugal.

== History ==
=== 15th century ===
The islands of Cape Verde came to be known by Europeans in 1460-62 by Prince Henry the Navigator (Son of King John I) and Antonio Noli, in the service of Henry's relative King Afonso V. The southeastern islands, including the largest island Santiago, were discovered in 1460 by António de Noli and Diogo Gomes. The remaining northwestern islands São Nicolau, São Vicente and Santo Antão were discovered in 1461 or 1462 by Diogo Afonso. There is no evidence of European settlement on Cape Verde prior to the arrival of the Portuguese.

In 1462, the Portuguese founded the town of Ribeira Grande (now Cidade Velha) on the south coast of Santiago. The settlement became a key port of call for Portuguese colonisation in both Africa and South America. In the 16th and 17th centuries, it was a centre of maritime trade of points among Africa, the Cape of Good Hope, Brazil in South America, and the Caribbean. Due to its proximity to the African coast, it was an essential platform for the Atlantic trade of enslaved Africans. Other early Portuguese settlements were São Filipe on the island of Fogo (between 1470 and 1490), Praia on Santiago (before 1516), Ribeira Grande on Santo Antão (mid 16th century), and Ribeira Brava on São Nicolau (1653).

Between 1492 and 1497, Manuel I of Portugal exiled thousands of conversos, Jews forced to accept baptism and conversion to Christianity but considered suspect, to São Tomé, Príncipe, and Cape Verde. They were allowed to engage in trade.

Freelance traders were referred to as lançados, who were often, but not always, of Jewish origin. Most married or had unions with African women, creating close trade ties with their families and clans.

=== 16th—19th centuries ===
The riches of Ribeira Grande and conflicts between Portugal and rival colonial powers France and Britain attracted pirate attacks, including those by Francis Drake (1585) and Jacques Cassard (1712). Despite the construction of Forte Real de São Filipe in 1587-93, Ribeira Grande remained vulnerable and went into decline. The capital was moved to Praia in 1770.

The eruption of the volcano Pico do Fogo in 1680 covered much of the island of Fogo in ash, which forced many inhabitants to flee to the nearby island of Brava. From the end of the 18th century, whaling ships from North America started hunting whales around the Azores and the Cape Verde Islands. They used the harbours of Brava to stock up on supplies and drinking water. They hired men from Brava as sailors, and several of these settled around the Massachusetts whaling port of New Bedford.

The exploitation of salt on the island of Sal took a rise from around 1800. The port city of Mindelo grew rapidly after 1838, when a coal depot was established to supply ships on Atlantic routes. In the course of the 19th century, the Plateau of Praia was completely redeveloped with streets according to a grid plan, lined with grand colonial buildings and mansions. Slavery was abolished in Cape Verde in 1876.

=== 20th century ===
From the beginning of the 20th century the port of Mindelo lost its importance for transatlantic navigation. Causes for this were the shift from coal to oil as fuel for ships, the rise of competing ports like Dakar and the Canary Islands and the lack of investment in port infrastructure. Due to its generally dry climate, Cape Verde has been struck by a series of drought-related famines between the 1580s and the 1950s. Two of Cape Verde's worst-ever famines occurred in 1941–43 and 1947–48, killing an estimated 45,000 people. Several thousands of islanders emigrated, for instance accepting contract labour on the cocoa plantations of Portuguese São Tomé and Príncipe.

In the lead-up to and during the Portuguese Colonial War, those planning and fighting in the armed conflict in Portuguese Guinea often linked the goal of liberation of Guinea-Bissau to the goal of liberation in Cape Verde. For instance, in 1956, Amílcar and Luís Cabral founded the African Party for the Independence of Guinea and Cape Verde (PAIGC). However, there was no armed conflict in Cape Verde, and ultimately independence for Cape Verde resulted from negotiation with Portugal after the April 1974 Carnation Revolution. In August 1974, an agreement was signed in Algiers between the Portuguese government and the PAIGC, recognising the independence of Guinea-Bissau and the right to independence of Cape Verde. On 5 July 1975, at Praia, Portugal's Prime Minister Vasco Gonçalves turned over power to National Assembly President Abílio Duarte, and Cape Verde became independent.

Cape Verde Islanders had higher educational levels and were often appointed to low-level administrative posts in Portuguese territories. Thereby they acquired a reputation of loyalty to Lisbon.

== Gallery ==
Proposed flag for Portuguese Cape Verde (1932)

Proposed flag for Portuguese Cape Verde (1965)

== See also ==
- History of Cape Verde
- Arquivo Histórico Ultramarino (archives in Lisbon documenting Portuguese Empire, including Cape Verde)
