= 1973 in Cape Verde =

- Decades: 1950s; 1960s; 1970s; 1980s; 1990s
- See also: History of Cape Verde; List of years in Cape Verde

The following lists events that happened during 1973 in Cape Verde.

== Incumbents ==
- Colonial governor: António Adriano Faria Lopes dos Santos

== Events ==
- March: The only legislative assembly election took place

== Sports ==
- GS Castilho won the Cape Verdean Football Championship

== Births ==
- July 20: Tcheka (Manuel Lopes Andrade), singer
- November 13: Paulo dos Santos, footballer
