= 1988 in Cape Verde =

- Decades: 1960s; 1970s; 1980s; 1990s; 2000s
- See also: Other events of 1988; Timeline of Cabo Verdean history

The following lists events that happened during 1988 in Cape Verde.

== Incumbents ==
- President: Aristides Pereira
- Prime Minister: Pedro Pires

== Events ==
- Cabopress, the national news agency established
- Newspaper Jornal O Cidadão established in Mindelo
- Jornal Horizonte, a newspaper established in Praia
- December 31: The National Historic Archives of Cape Verde established

== Sports ==
- CS Mindelense won the Cape Verdean Football Championship

== Births ==
- January 5: Kay, footballer
- January 31: Fredson Rodrigues, footballer
- February 4: Edson Cruz, footballer
- February 24: Gegé, footballer
- April 18: Tino Santos, footballer
- May 6: Sténio, footballer
- May 20: Stopira, footballer
- May 25: Dany Mendes Ribeiro, footballer
- July 10: Nivaldo Alves Freitas Santos, footballer
- August 29: Delmiro, footballer
- October 13: Hélder Samir Lopes Semedo Fernandes, footballer
- October 22: Cabral, footballer
- October 29: Adilson Vaz, footballer
- November 9: Valter Borges, footballer
- November 14: Héldon Ramos, footballer
- November 19: Júlio Tavares, footballer
