= 1991 in Cape Verde =

- Decades: 1970s; 1980s; 1990s; 2000s; 2010s
- See also: Other events of 1991; Timeline of Cabo Verdean history

The following lists events that happened during 1991 in Cape Verde.

== Incumbents ==
- Prime Minister
  - Pedro Pires
  - Carlos Veiga
- President:
  - Aristides Pereira
  - António Mascarenhas Monteiro

== Events ==
- 1991 local elections took place
- École Internationale Les Alizés opened in Praia
- Newspaper Expresso das Ilhas established in Praia
- Newspaper A Semana established in Praia
- January 13: the 1991 parliamentary elections took place
- February 17: the 1991 presidential elections took place
- March 22: President Monteiro took office succeeding Aristides Pereira
- April 15: Newspaper Artiletra established

== Arts and entertainment ==
- November 15: Cesária Évora's album Mar Azul released

== Sports ==
- Sporting Praia won the Cape Verdean Football Championship

== Births ==
- January 1: Edivândio, footballer
- January 24: Zé Luís, footballer
- January 26: Joazimar Stehb, footballer
- February 10: Nuno da Costa, footballer
- March 21: Djaniny, footballer
- April 10: Jorge Kadú, footballer
- August 18: Rodirlei José Ascensão Duarte (Rodi), footballer
- December 18: Ricardo Gomes, footballer
