= 1985 in Cape Verde =

- Decades: 1960s; 1970s; 1980s; 1990s; 2000s
- See also: Other events of 1985; Timeline of Cabo Verdean history

The following lists events that happened during 1985 in Cape Verde.

== Incumbents ==
- President: Aristides Pereira
- Prime Minister: Pedro Pires

== Events ==
- December 7: 1985 parliamentary elections took place

== Sports ==
- Sporting Praia won the Cape Verdean Football Championship

== Births ==
- May 2: João Gomes, basketball player
- June 2: Graciano Brito, soccer player (footballer)
- July 27: Elvis Macedo Babanco, footballer
- August 31: Rolando, footballer
- October 11: Joel Almeida, basketball player
- October 13: Vanny Reis, pageant
