= 2015 in Cape Verde =

- Decades: 1990s; 2000s; 2010s; 2020s
- See also: History of Cape Verde; List of years in Cape Verde

The following lists events that happened during 2015 in Cape Verde.

== Incumbents ==
- President: Jorge Carlos Fonseca
- Prime Minister: José Maria Neves

== Events ==
- January 8: The ferry boat Vicente sunk off the island of Fogo, killing 15 people.
- August 31- September 1: Hurricane Fred struck the islands of Santiago, Boa Vista, Maio, Sal, São Nicolau, São Vicente and Santo Antão.
- November 4: Zika virus was confirmed in the nation

== Sports ==
- CS Mindelense won the Cape Verdean Football Championship

== Deaths ==
- August 18: Arnaldo Carlos de Vasconcelos França, 89, minister of finance (1990–1991).
