= 1986 in Cape Verde =

- Decades: 1960s; 1970s; 1980s; 1990s; 2000s
- See also: Other events of 1986; Timeline of Cabo Verdean history

The following lists events that happened during 1986 in Cape Verde.

== Incumbents ==
- President: Aristides Pereira
- Prime Minister: Pedro Pires

== Events ==
- Jardim Botânico Nacional Grandvaux Barbosa, Cape Verde's only botanical garden was created.

== Sports ==
- The Cape Verdean Football Championship was postponed.

== Births ==
- January 11: Djô, footballer
- February 23: Sidnei, footballer
- April 2: Tuga, footballer
- April 14: David Renato Cruz Coronel, nickname: Bijou, footballer
- April 16: Platini (Cape Verdean footballer)
- June 3: Josimar Dias, later Vozinha, footballer
- June 13: Toni Varela, footballer
- July 14: Osvaldo Tavares Oliveira, later Figo, footballer
- July 20: Patas, footballer
- August 9: Wania Monteiro, athlete
- September 2: Gélson Fernandes, footballer
- November 17: Nani, footballer
- December 4: Aires Marques, or Alex, footballer
