= 1987 in Cape Verde =

- Decades: 1960s; 1970s; 1980s; 1990s; 2000s
- See also: Other events of 1987; Timeline of Cabo Verdean history

The following is a list of events that happened during 1987 in Cape Verde.

== Incumbents ==
- President: Aristides Pereira
- Prime Minister: Pedro Pires

== Sports ==
- Boavista Praia won the Cape Verdean Football Championship

== Births ==
- January 2: Pedro Celestino Silva Soares, footballer
- March 18: Gilson Manuel Silva Alves, footballer
- March 27: Roberto Xalino, singer
- March 31: Odaïr Fortes, footballer
- June 9: Ballack, footballer
- June 12: Tom Tavares, footballer
- August 5: Nilson António, footballer
- November 25: Ericson Silva, footballer
