= 1978 in Cape Verde =

- Decades: 1950s; 1960s; 1970s; 1980s; 1990s
- See also: History of Cape Verde; List of years in Cape Verde

The following lists events that happened during 1978 in Cape Verde.

== Incumbents ==
- President: Aristides Pereira
- Prime Minister: Pedro Pires

== Events ==
- Trade union UNTC-CS established

== Sports ==
- Final of the Cape Verdean Football Championship was not played

== Births ==
- February 4: Elvis Évora, basketball player
- March 17: Mário Correia, basketball player
- April 7: Hernani Almeida, musician
- June 9: Nando Maria Neves, footballer
- December 7: Ronny Souto, footballer
