= 1958 in Cape Verde =

- Decades: 1930s; 1940s; 1950s; 1960s; 1970s
- See also: Other events of 1958; Timeline of Cabo Verdean history

The following lists events that happened during 1958 in Cape Verde.

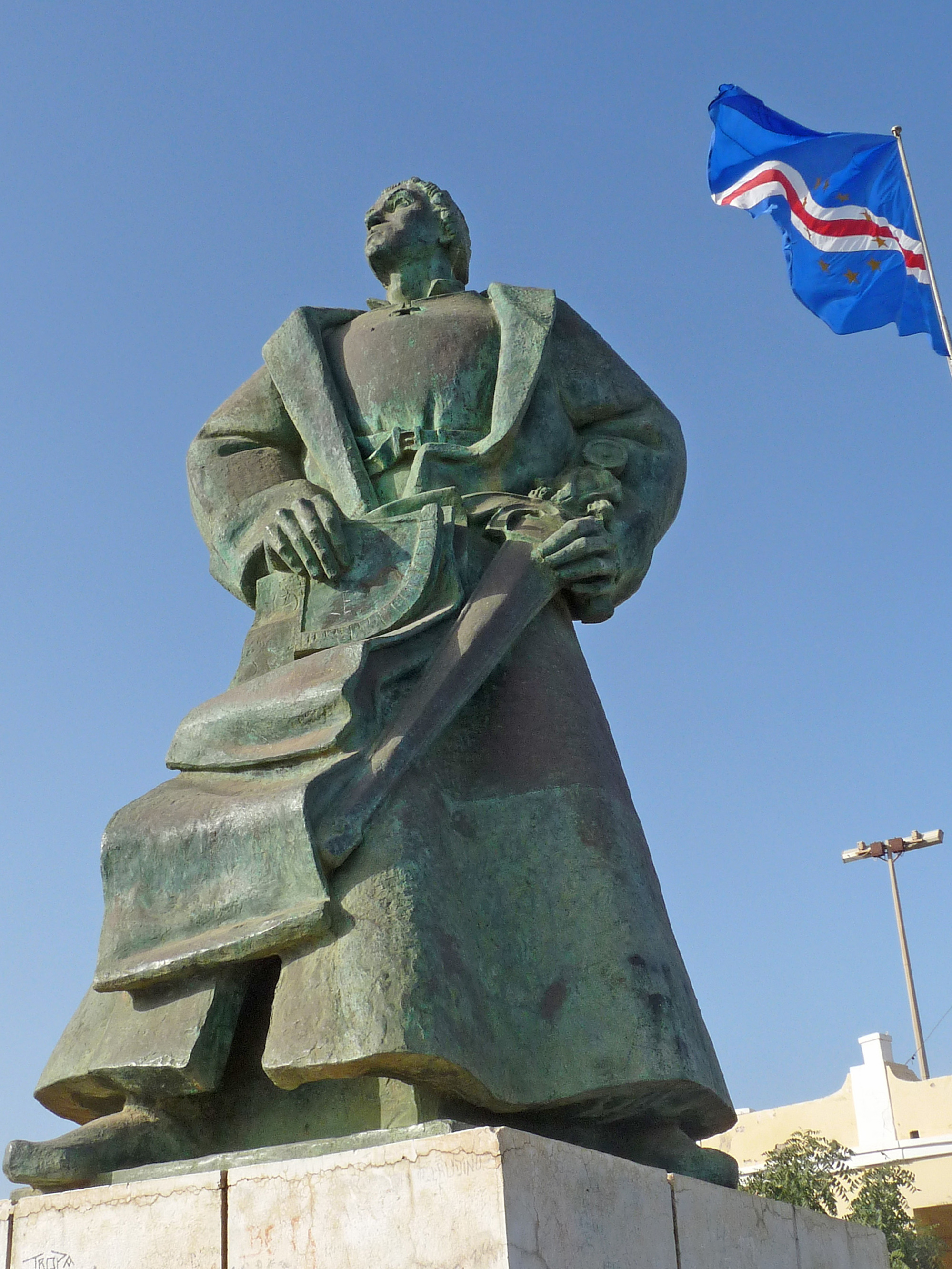
The statue of Diogo Gomes in Praia was dedicated in 1958

== Incumbents ==
- Colonial governor:
  - António Augusto Peixoto Correia
  - Silvino Silvério Marques

== Events ==
- Cabo Verde Airlines (formally known as TACV: Transportes Aéreos de Cabo Verde) established
- A significant drought occurred on the islands
- 14 June - The colony celebrated the centennial of Praia being given city status; celebrations include the dedication of a statue of Diogo Gomes, proclaiming him the discoverer of the islands.

== Births ==
- Cristina Fontes Lima, politician
