= 2019 in Cape Verde =

- Decades: 1990s; 2000s; 2010s; 2020s
- See also: Other events of 2019; Timeline of Cabo Verdean history

Events of 2019 in Cape Verde.

== Incumbents ==
- Presidents: Jorge Carlos Fonseca
- Prime Minister: José Ulisses Correia e Silva

== Events ==
- October 12: Cape Verde takes second place in the 2019 WAFU Cup of Nations plate competition, after losing to Guinea in a penalty shootout.

== Deaths ==
- October 4: Amaro Alexandre da Luz, 85, first minister of finance.
