= 1990 in Cape Verde =

- Decades: 1970s; 1980s; 1990s; 2000s; 2010s
- See also: Other events of 1990; Timeline of Cabo Verdean history

The following lists events that happened during 1990 in Cape Verde.

== Incumbents ==
- President: Aristides Pereira
- Prime Minister: Pedro Pires

== Events ==
- March 14: The Movement for Democracy political party established
- June 23 census: Population: 355,278

== Arts and entertainment ==
- Cesária Évora's album Distino di Belita released

== Sports ==
- CS Mindelense won the Cape Verdean Football Championship

== Births ==
- January 8: Ryan Mendes, footballer
- March 23: Wuilito Fernandes, soccer player
- May 12: Gilson Varela, footballer
- May 18: Luis Germano Pires Lopes de Almeida (Kiki Ballack), footballer
