= Ballack =

Ballack may refer to:

- Michael Ballack (born 1976), retired German footballer
- Ballack (footballer, born 1987) (born 1987), Cape Verde footballer
- Sainey Touray (born 1990), known as Ballack, Gambian footballer
- Luís Germano Pires Lopes de Almeida (born 1990), known as Kiki Ballack, Cape Verde footballer
