= 1981 in Cape Verde =

- Decades: 1960s; 1970s; 1980s; 1990s; 2000s
- See also: Other events of 1981; Timeline of Cabo Verdean history

The following lists events that happened during 1981 in Cape Verde.

== Incumbents ==
- President: Aristides Pereira
- Prime Minister: Pedro Pires

== Events ==
- January: African Party for the Independence of Cape Verde (PAICV) party was established after separating from the African Party for the Independence of Guinea and Cape Verde (PAIGC)

== Sports ==
- CS Mindelense won the Cape Verdean Football Championship

== Births ==
- March 16: Mikoyam Tavares, footballer
