= 1959 in Cape Verde =

- Decades: 1930s; 1940s; 1950s; 1960s; 1970s
- See also: Other events of 1959; Timeline of Cabo Verdean history

The following lists events that happened during 1959 in Cape Verde.

== Incumbents ==
- Colonial governor: Silvino Silvério Marques

== Births ==
- February 11: Adriano Spencer, footballer who played in Portugal (d. 2006)
- May 29: Maria Helena Semedo, economist and politician, former Deputy Director-General of the Food and Agriculture Organization (FAO)
