= 2026 in Cape Verde =

- Decades: 2000s; 2010s; 2020s
- See also: History of Cape Verde; List of years in Cape Verde

Events in the year 2026 in Cape Verde.

== Incumbents ==
- President: José Maria Neves
- Prime Minister: Ulisses Correia e Silva

== Events ==
- 5 February – The UK Health Security Agency (UKHSA) issues a travel warning for Cape Verde, after dozens of British tourists fall ill with stomach bugs such as shigella and salmonella.
- 17 May – 2026 Cape Verdean parliamentary election: The opposition PAICV wins a majority of seats in the National Assembly.
- 11 June–19 July – Cape Verde participates at the 2026 FIFA World Cup
- 5 September – A bus plunges 30 m (98 ft) into a ravine in Fogo, killing 25 people.
- 15 November – 2026 Cape Verdean presidential election: José Maria Neves is reelected to a second five-year term, with 63.8% of the vote.

== Holidays ==
- 1 January – New Year's Day
- 13 January – Democracy Day
- 20 January – Heroes' Day
- 1 May – Labour Day
- 1 June – Youth Day
- 5 July – Independence Day
- 15 August – Assumption Day
- 1 November – All Saints' Day
- 25 December – Christmas Day
