= 1980 in Cape Verde =

- Decades: 1960s; 1970s; 1980s; 1990s; 2000s
- See also: History of Cape Verde; List of years in Cape Verde

The following lists events that happened during 1980 in Cape Verde.

== Incumbents ==
- President: Aristides Pereira
- Prime Minister: Pedro Pires

== Events ==
- March: Population: 296,050
- March 27: National Technological Investigation Institute (INIT - Instituto Nacional de Investigação Tecnológica) established, now part of the University of Cape Verde

== Sports ==
- Botafogo of Fogo won the Cape Verdean Football Championship
