= Mohamed Karamoko =

Ivorian footballer

Personal information
- Date of birth: 25 January 2002 (age 24)
- Position: Forward

Team information
- Current team: Sertanense
- Number: 77

Youth career
- –2020: Séwé

Senior career*
Years	Team	Apps	(Gls)
2020	USMP	12	(0)
2021–	Sertanense	8	(2)
- * Club domestic league appearances and goals as of 05:00, 8 February 2022 (UTC)

Mohamed Karamoko (born 25 January 2002) is an Ivorian footballer who plays as a forward for Sertanense.

== Career statistics ==
=== Club ===
As of 8 February 2022.

Club	Season	League			Cup		Continental		Other		Total	
Club	Season	Division	Apps	Goals	Apps	Goals	Apps	Goals	Apps	Goals	Apps	Goals
USMP	2020	Liga 1	12	0	0	0	0	0	0	0	12	0
Sertanense	2021–22	Campeonato de Portugal	8	2	1 (Note: Appearances in the Taça de Portugal)	0	–		0	0	9	2
Career total			20	2	1	0	0	0	0	0	21	2
