= Cristina Duarte =

Cape Verdean politician

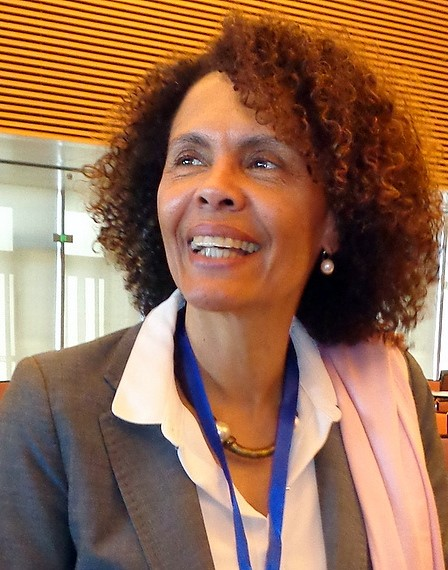
Cristina Duarte in March 2015

Cristina Duarte (born 2 September 1962) is a Cape Verdean politician who served as the Cape Verdean Minister of Finance, Planning and Public Administration from 2006 to 2016. Since 2020, she has been serving as Special Adviser on Africa to United Nations Secretary‑General António Guterres.

== Early life and education ==
Duarte was born in Lisbon in the Portuguese capital (then also center of the Portuguese Empire). Her father Manuel Duarte was a Freedom Fighter in Angola, Guinea-Bissau and Cape Verde. She later studied at a primary school in Angola up to the age of twelve. Later, the Carnation Revolution of April 25, 1974 took place which ended the Portuguese dictatorial regime of Estado Novo. Not long after, she attended a high school in Cape Verde.

Duarte later moved to Portugal where she studied in economics at the Technical University of Lisbon. She is fluent in Portuguese, Capeverdean Creole, English, French and Italian.

== Early career ==
Duarte served as director general of the Bureau of Studies of the planning of the Ministry of Agricultural Development from 1986 to 1991. In the early 1990s, she lived in the USA and got her MBA in the area of World Finances and Emerging Capital Markets at the Thunderbird School of Global Management in Arizona.

== Political career ==
Duarte became Minister of Finances, Planning and Public Administration in 2006 as member of the PAICV. She gained a professional experience mainly in the Director General in the Study Cabinet of the Planning of the Ministry of Agricultural Development with the Consultant to the United Nations on Agriculture and Food, the UN Development Programme and the World Bank. In the private sector, she worked at Citigroup/Citibank (commonly as Citi), Since 2006, she worked with the African Development Bank, the World Bank and the IMF.

== Career in international organizations ==
In 2014, Duarte was considered in the magazine, Financial Afrik, one of 100 most influential persons in Africa. In 2015, she was one of eight candidates for the president of the African Development Bank; the post would be taken by Akinwumi Adesina of Nigeria.

Duarte currently serves as a member of the United Nations Committee of Experts on Public Administration and High-Level Advisory Board on Economic and Social Affairs, President Paul Kagame’s Advisory Committee on African Union Reforms, the Board of the Alliance for a Green Revolution in Africa (AGRA) and the Board of the Institute of African Leadership for Sustainable Development at the UONGOZI Institute.

In 2020, United Nations Secretary‑General António Guterres appointed Duarte as his Special Adviser on Africa. In that capacity, Duarte succeeded Bience Gawanas.

== Personal life ==
Duarte is married and has a daughter.
