= 1944 in Cape Verde =

- Decades: 1920s; 1930s; 1940s; 1950s; 1960s
- See also: Other events of 1944; Timeline of Cabo Verdean history

The following lists events that happened during 1944 in Cape Verde.

== Incumbents ==
- Colonial governor: João de Figueiredo

== Events ==
- March - Cape Verdean review Certeza started publishing in Praia

== Births ==
- 22 February: Isaura Gomes, politician and pharmacist
- 17 May: Luís de Matos Monteiro da Fonseca, politician
