= 1989 in Cape Verde =

- Decades: 1960s; 1970s; 1980s; 1990s; 2000s
- See also: Other events of 1989; Timeline of Cabo Verdean history

The following lists events that happened during 1989 in Cape Verde.

== Incumbents ==
- President: Aristides Pereira
- Prime Minister: Pedro Pires

== Arts and entertainment ==
- Germano Almeida's novel The Last Will and Testament of Senhor da Silva Araújo published

== Sports ==
- Académica do Mindelo won the Cape Verdean Football Championship

== Births ==
- February 25: Anilton, futsal player
- May 10: Ivan Almeida, basketball player
- August 2:
  - Kuca, footballer
  - Josimar Lima, footballer
- September 17: Steevan dos Santos, footballer
- October 4: Rambé footballer
