= 2020 in Cape Verde =

- Decades: 2000s; 2010s; 2020s
- See also: Other events of 2020; Timeline of Cabo Verdean history

The following lists events that happened during 2020 in Cape Verde.

== Incumbents ==
- President: Jorge Carlos Fonseca
- Prime Minister: Ulisses Correia e Silva

== Events ==
- 17 March – As a contingency measure, the prime minister announced the suspension of all incoming flights from the United States, Brazil, Senegal, Nigeria, Portugal, and all European countries affected by COVID-19 for three weeks. Exceptions are for cargo flights and flights for foreign citizens wishing to return home. The ban also applies to the docking of cruise ships, sailing ships and landing from passengers or crew from cargo ships or fishing ships.
- 20 March – The first case of COVID-19 in the country is confirmed, being a 62 year old foreigner from the United Kingdom.
- 25 August – The Attorney General opens an investigation into Fernando Gil Évora and Carlos Dos Anjos, who posed as representatives of President Nicolás Maduro in favor of Colombian Alex Saab.

== See also ==
- 2020 in West Africa
- 2020 in North Africa
