= Amina Kamara =

- Born: 31 January 1987 (age 38); London, United Kingdom
- Height: 5 ft 9 in (1.75 m)
- Website: https://web.archive.org/web/20181006235620/http://www.misswestafrica.com/

Amina Kamara (born 31 January 1987 in London, England) was the first winner of the title Miss West Africa in 2008, where she represented Sierra Leone at the inaugural Miss West Africa pageant in London.

== Early life and education ==
Amina Kamara was born in London, England in 1987 to Sierra Leonean parents. She grew up in North West London and attended school at Harlesden Primary School before moving on to Queens Park Community School in 1997.

She attended QPCS up to year nine and then her parents decided to move to East London. Amina then attended a school in Chingford called Rush Croft School and finished her GCSEs there. Separated from her West African origins, her one great wish was to travel around the world and experience different cultures and meet all sorts of people, including being a strong part of the growth of her home country Sierra Leone.

She then moved on to Waltham Forest College where she began to study Tourism for three years and achieved an Advanced Vocational Certificate in Tourism. She then attended the University of Kent to study a BA Hons in Tourism Management, where she learnt the importance of Tourism planning and development and managing tourism in countries.

During her studies, Kamara modeled with a number of fashion designers in the United Kingdom.

== Miss West Africa ==
Kamara picked up an interest in modeling and engaged in various modeling activities before coming across an invite by Nana Tamakloe to participate in the first ever Miss West Africa beauty pageant.

Among 11 finalists, Kamara was crowned Miss West Africa on 8 November 2008 at Conway Hall in London.

Honorary titles
Preceded by None	Miss West Africa; 2008	Succeeded by Shireen Benjamin
