= Osvaldo Lopes da Silva =

Cape Verdean politician (born 1936)

Osvaldo Lopes da Silva (born August 25, 1936) is a Cape Verdean politician, economist and anti-colonial activist.

== Life and career ==
Osvaldo Lopes da Silva was born August 25, 1936 in Ribeira Brava, São Nicolau. He studied Civil engineering in Portugal until 1961, when he fled into exile to join Amílcar Cabral's movement. He was an early member of the PAIGC (African Party for the Independence of Guinea and Cape Verde).

Following Cape Verde's independence in 1975, he served as the minister of finance (1977–1986).
