= Shireen Benjamin =

Miss West Africa 2009/10

- Born: 8 September 1988 (age 36); London, England
- Height: 5 ft 8 in (1.73 m)
- Website: http://www.misswestafrica.com

Shireen Benjamin (born 8 September 1988 in London, England) was crowned Miss West Africa 2009/10, representing Sierra Leone, at the pageant in London where she became the second holder of the title.

Honorary titles
Preceded by Amina Kamara	Miss West Africa; 2009/10	Succeeded by Vanny Reis
