= 2025 in Cape Verde =

- Decades: 2000s; 2010s; 2020s
- See also: History of Cape Verde; List of years in Cape Verde

Events in the year 2025 in Cape Verde.

== Incumbents ==
- President: José Maria Neves
- Prime Minister: Ulisses Correia e Silva

== Events ==
- February 11 – A sit-in is staged in Mindelo.
- March 25 – Queen Letizia of Spain visits Cape Verde.
- April 2 – EasyJet opens its first sub-Saharan service on the island of Sal.
- August 13 – Flash floods caused by Tropical Storm Erin hit São Vicente and Santo Antão, killing at least nine people and displacing 1,500. The government declares a state of emergency.
- October 13 – Cape Verde qualifies for its first FIFA World Cup after defeating Eswatini 3-0 at the 2026 FIFA World Cup qualification in Praia.

== Holidays ==
- 1 January – New Year's Day
- 13 January – Democracy Day
- 20 January – Heroes' Day
- 1 May – Labour Day
- 1 June – Youth Day
- 5 July – Independence Day
- 15 August – Assumption Day
- 1 November – All Saints' Day
- 25 December – Christmas Day

=== Deaths ===
- 8 December – José Filomeno Monteiro, 70, minister of foreign affairs (2024–2025).
