= 1979 in Cape Verde =

- Decades: 1950s; 1960s; 1970s; 1980s; 1990s
- See also: Other events of 1979; Timeline of Cabo Verdean history

The following lists events that happened during 1979 in Cape Verde.

== Incumbents ==
- President: Aristides Pereira
- Prime Minister: Pedro Pires

== Events ==
- Cape Verde ratified the UN treaties of the International Convention on the Elimination of All Forms of Racial Discrimination and the International Convention on the Suppression and Punishment of the Crime of Apartheid
- June 28: Escola de Formação de Professores (EFPES), Cape Verde's first college established, it is now part of the University of Cape Verde

== Births ==
- Yara dos Santos, singer
- January 14: Dário Furtado, footballer
- November 30: Janício Martins, footballer
