= 1970 in Cape Verde =

- Decades: 1950s; 1960s; 1970s; 1980s; 1990s
- See also: Other events of 1970; Timeline of Cabo Verdean history

The following lists events that happened during 1970 in Cape Verde.

== Incumbents ==
- Colonial governor: António Adriano Faria Lopes dos Santos

== Events ==
- Population: 271,279
