= 2022 in Cape Verde =

- Decades: 2000s; 2010s; 2020s
- See also: Other events of 2022; Timeline of Cabo Verdean history

Events in the year 2022 in Cape Verde.

== Incumbents ==
- President: José Maria Neves
- Prime Minister: Ulisses Correia e Silva

== Events ==
Ongoing – COVID-19 pandemic in Cape Verde

- 20 June – It is announced that Cape Verde will allocate a budget of $85 million to combat the effects of the Russian invasion of Ukraine, which has caused an increase in the prices of gasoline and food, as 9% of Cape Verdeans are currently facing a food crisis.

== Sports ==
- 2021 Africa Cup of Nations:
  - 9 January – Ethiopia 0–1 Cape Verde
  - 13 January – Cape Verde 0–1 Burkina Faso
  - 17 January – Cape Verde 1–1 Cameroon
  - 26 January – Cape Verde 0–2 Senegal (round of 16 knockout)
