= 1961 in Cape Verde =

- Decades: 1940s; 1950s; 1960s; 1970s; 1980s
- See also: Other events of 1961; Timeline of Cabo Verdean history

The following lists events that happened during 1961 in Cape Verde.

== Incumbents ==
- Colonial governor: Silvino Silvério Marques

== Events ==
- Praia Airport opened as the nation's third airport
- September 6: Hurricane Debbie passed through Cape Verde

== Sports ==
- Sporting Praia won the Cape Verdean Football Championship
