= 1960 in Cape Verde =

- Decades: 1940s; 1950s; 1960s; 1970s; 1980s
- See also: Other events of 1960; Timeline of Cabo Verdean history

The following lists events that happened during 1960 in Cape Verde.

== Incumbents ==
- Colonial governor: Silvino Silvério Marques

== Events ==
- Population: 199,743
- São Pedro Airport (now Cesária Évora Airport) opened as the country's second airport
- December 10: Praia National Lyceum (Liceu Nacional da Praia) was established, today known as Liceu Domingos Ramos

== Sports ==
- CS Mindelense won the Cape Verdean Football Championship

== Arts and entertainment ==
- December: Claridade review ceased publication after fourteen years of existence
