= Adilson Vaz =

Cape Verdean footballer (born 1988)

Personal information
- Date of birth: 29 October 1988 (age 38)
- Place of birth: Praia, Cape Verde
- Height: 1.86 m (6 ft 1 in)
- Position: Centre-back

Team information
- Current team: Montalegre
- Number: 22

Senior career*
Years	Team	Apps	(Gls)
2009–2010	União Madeira B	22	(0)
2010–2012	Sertanense	49	(5)
2012–2013	Desportivo Aves	4	(0)
2013–2014	Gondomar	50	(2)
2014	Santa Clara	0	(0)
2015	Sobrado	0	(0)
2015–2017	Gafanha	32	(5)
2017–2018	Fafe	28	(1)
2018	Trofense	9	(1)
2019	Olhanense	7	(0)
2019–	Montalegre	38	(3)

Managerial career
- União Madeira
- * Club domestic league appearances and goals as of 21 October 2021

Adilson Vaz (born 29 October 1988), commonly known as Vaz, is a Cape Verdean footballer who plays as a centre-back for C.D.C. Montalegre.

== Career ==
In July 2019 it was confirmed, that Vaz had joined C.D.C. Montalegre.
