= 1964 in Cape Verde =

- Decades: 1940s; 1950s; 1960s; 1970s; 1980s
- See also: Other events of 1964; Timeline of Cabo Verdean history

The following lists events that happened during 1964 in Cape Verde.

== Incumbents ==
- Colonial governor:
  - Leão Maria Tavares Rosado do Sacramento Monteiro

== Sports ==
- Académica do Mindelo won the Cape Verdean Football Championship

== Births ==
- Teófilo Chantre, singer
- September 2: Daniel Batista Lima, footballer
- October 21: Mário Lúcio, singer, former Minister of culture
- November 6: José Rui, footballer
- December 13: Ildo Augusto dos Santos Lopes Fortes, bishop of Mindelo
