= 1984 in Cape Verde =

- Decades: 1960s; 1970s; 1980s; 1990s; 2000s
- See also: Other events of 1984; Timeline of Cabo Verdean history

The following lists events that happened during 1984 in Cape Verde.

== Incumbents ==
- President: Aristides Pereira
- Prime Minister: Pedro Pires

== Events ==
- February 17: the national airport authority, Aeroportos e Segurança Aérea, was established

== Arts and entertainment ==
- August: first edition of the annual Festival de Baía das Gatas, on the island of São Vicenteo

== Sports ==
- FC Derby won the Cape Verdean Football Championship

== Births ==
- February 6: Dani Gomes Monteiro, footballer
- October 27: Alison Brito, footballer
