= 1962 in Cape Verde =

- Decades: 1940s; 1950s; 1960s; 1970s; 1980s
- See also: Other events of 1962; Timeline of Cabo Verdean history

The following lists events that happened during 1962 in Cape Verde.

== Incumbents ==
- Colonial governor: Silvino Silvério Marques

== Events ==
- The port of Porto Grande, Mindelo, was expanded

== Sports ==
- CS Mindelense won the Cape Verdean Football Championship

== Births ==
- Bau, musician
- January 27: Neno, footballer
- March 15: Jorge Pedro Mauricio dos Santos, politician, current president of the National Assembly
- 17 May: Antonio Evora Querido, UN FAO Resident Representative in Uganda
- June 4: Ulisses Correia e Silva, politician and Prime Minister
