= 1975 Cape Verdean parliamentary election =

- 30 June 1975

All 56 seats in the National People's Assembly 29 seats needed for a majority
- Registered: 121,724
- Turnout: 86.7%
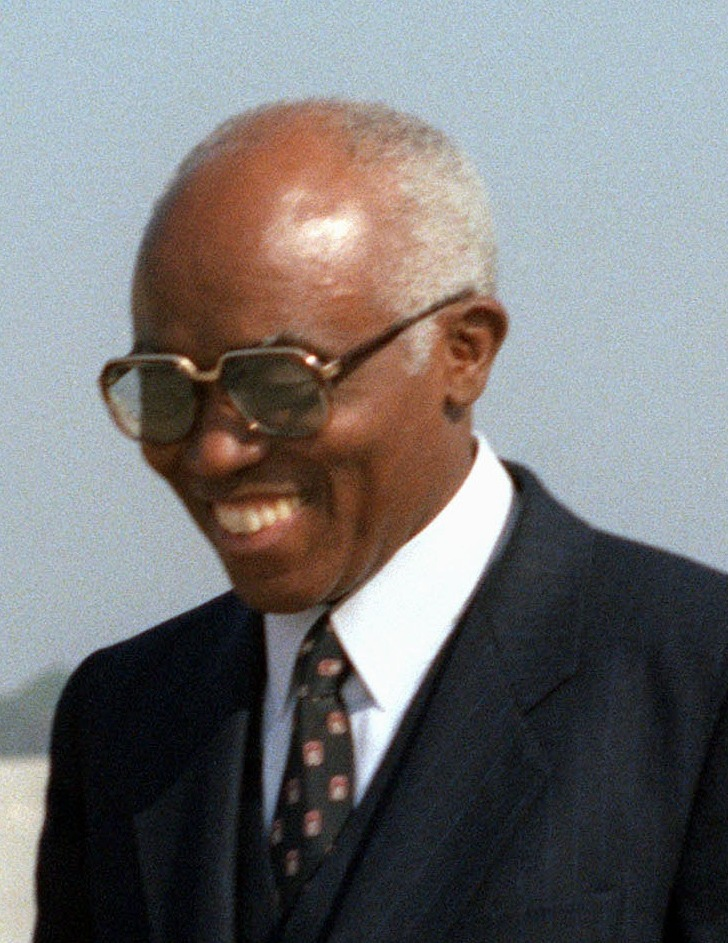
	First party
Leader	Aristides Pereira
Party	PAIGC
Seats won	56
Popular vote	100,835
Percentage	95.6%
- Results by constituency
Prime Minister before election
Vicente Almeida d'Eça
Colonial governor
Elected Prime Minister
Aristides Pereira
PAIGC

Parliamentary elections were held in Cape Verde in June 1975 in preparation for independence from Portugal on 5 July. The African Party for the Independence of Guinea and Cape Verde was the sole legal party at the time, with voters being asked to approve or reject a PAIGC list of 56 members for the National People's Assembly. Its party leader was Aristides Pereira. The list was approved by 95.6% of voters, with a turnout of 86.7%.

== Results ==
Party	Votes	%	Seats
African Party for the Independence of Guinea and Cape Verde	100,835	95.58	56
Against	4,668	4.42	–
Total	105,503	100.00	56
Registered voters/turnout	121,724	–	
Source: Nohlen et al.
