= 1974 in Cape Verde =

- Decades: 1950s; 1960s; 1970s; 1980s; 1990s
- See also: Other events of 1974; Timeline of Cabo Verdean history

The following lists events that happened during 1974 in Cape Verde.

== Incumbents ==
- Colonial governor:
  - António Adriano Faria Lopes dos Santos
  - Henrique da Silva Horta
  - Vicente Almeida d'Eça
- High commissioner: Vicente Almeida d'Eça

== Events ==
- April 25: the Carnation Revolution took place in Portugal, the Estado Novo regime collapsed, Cape Verde became an autonomous province
- April 26: In the evening, all prisoners from the Tarrafal Camp were released
- September 24: African Youth Amílcar Cabral founded, since 1991, it is now the Youth of PAICV
- October 13: politician Pedro Pires returned to Praia after being exiled

== Arts and entertainment ==
- Orlanda Amarílis' short story book Cais-do-Sodré té Salamansa was published

== Sports ==
- CD Travadores won the Cape Verdean Football Championship

== Births ==
- March 27: Manuel dos Santos Fernandes, footballer
- April 1: Maria Martins, athlete
- October 25: Gil Semedo, singer
- December 7: Louisa da Conceição, basketball player
