= 1982 in Cape Verde =

- Decades: 1960s; 1970s; 1980s; 1990s; 2000s
- See also: Other events of 1982; Timeline of Cabo Verdean history

The following lists events that happened during 1982 in Cape Verde.

== Incumbents ==
- President: Aristides Pereira
- Prime Minister: Pedro Pires

== Events ==
- April 17: Utilities company Electra established
- Summer: tropical storm Beryl hit Sal and Brava

== Arts and entertainment ==
- Germano Almeida's book O dia das calças roladas published

== Sports ==
- February 11-19: the 1982 Amílcar Cabral Cup took place in Praia

== Births ==
- July 11: Emerson da Luz, footballer
- July 25: Fredson Tavares, footballer
