= 1985 Cape Verdean parliamentary election =

- 7 December 1985

All 83 seats in the National People's Assembly
- Registered: 143,303
- Turnout: 68.87%
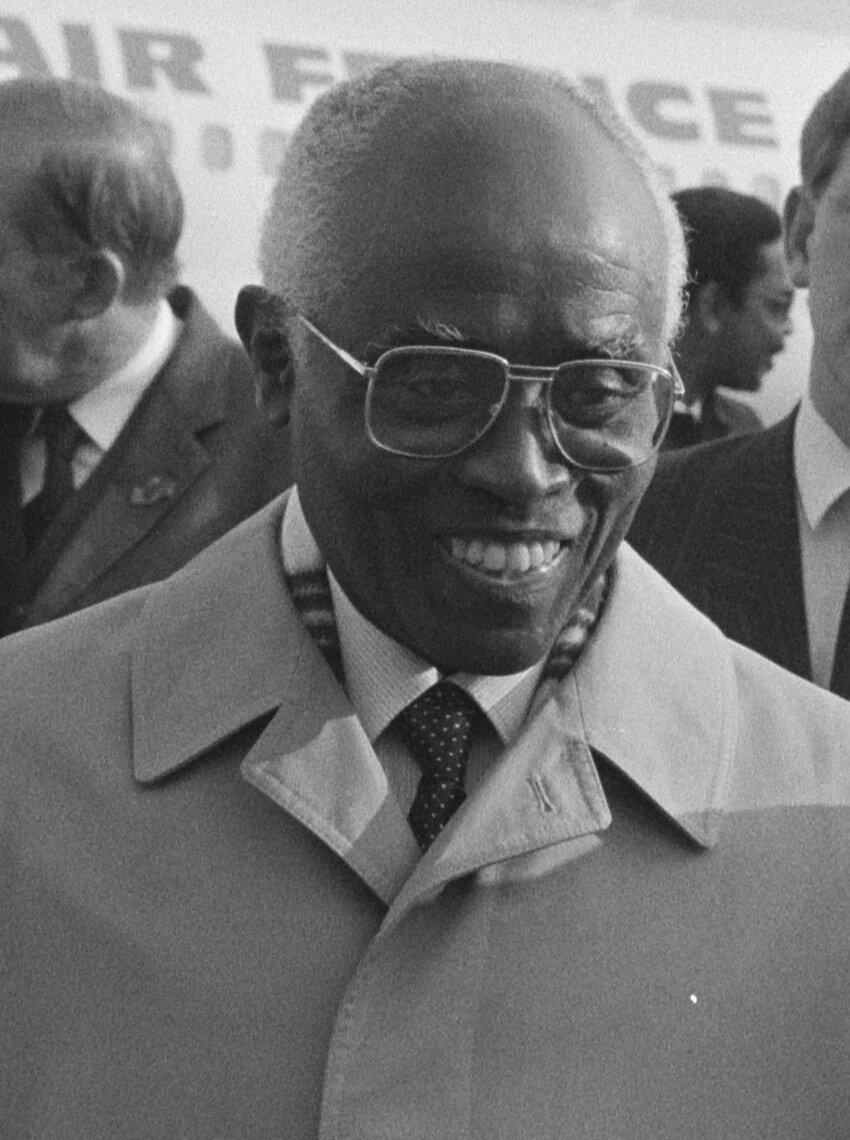
	First party
Leader	Aristides Pereira
Party	PAICV
Leader's seat	Praia Urbano
Seats won	83
Seat change	▲20
Popular vote	93,252
Percentage	94.87%
- Results by constituency
Prime Minister before election
Aristides Pereira
PAICV
Elected Prime Minister
Aristides Pereira
PAICV

Parliamentary elections were held in Cape Verde on 7 December 1985. The country was a one-party state at the time, with the African Party for the Independence of Cape Verde (PAICV) as the sole legal party. The PAICV presented a list of 83 candidates to voters to approve. The list was approved by 94.0% of voters, with a turnout of 68.9%.

Its election campaign began on 18 November and finished a day before the elections on 7 December.

== Results ==
Party	Votes	%	Seats	+/–
African Party for the Independence of Cape Verde	93,252	94.87	83	+20
Against	5,038	5.13	–	–
Total	98,290	100.00	83	+20
Valid votes	98,290	99.59		
Invalid/blank votes	402	0.41		
Total votes	98,692	100.00		
Registered voters/turnout	143,303	68.87		
Source: African Elections Database
