= João Serra =

Cape Verdean politician and economist (born 1961)

João António Pinto Serra (born 25 September 1961) is a Cape Verdean politician and economist.

== Life and career ==
Serra was born 25 September 1961 in Praia. He served as the minister of finance between 2004 and 2006.

In 2014, he was announced as the Governor of the Bank of Cape Verde.
