= 1993 in Cape Verde =

- Decades: 1970s; 1980s; 1990s; 2000s; 2010s
- See also: Other events of 1993; Timeline of Cabo Verdean history

The following lists events that happened during 1993 in Cape Verde.

== Incumbents ==
- President: António Mascarenhas Monteiro
- Prime Minister: Carlos Veiga

== Events ==
- Cape Verde ratified the UN treaties, the International Covenant on Economic, Social and Cultural Rights and the International Covenant on Civil and Political Rights
- February 7: the delimitation treaty between Cape Verde and Senegal was signed
- September 1: The government separated the commercial functions from the (central) Bank of Cape Verde, establishing Banco Comercial do Atlântico

== Sports ==
- Académica do Sal won the Cape Verdean Football Championship

== Births ==
- Elida Almeida, singer
- January 22: Kukula, footballer
- February 9: Patrick Andrade, footballer
- November 1: António Correia, footballer
