= 2023 in Cape Verde =

- Decades: 2000s; 2010s; 2020s
- See also: Other events of 2023; Timeline of Cabo Verdean history

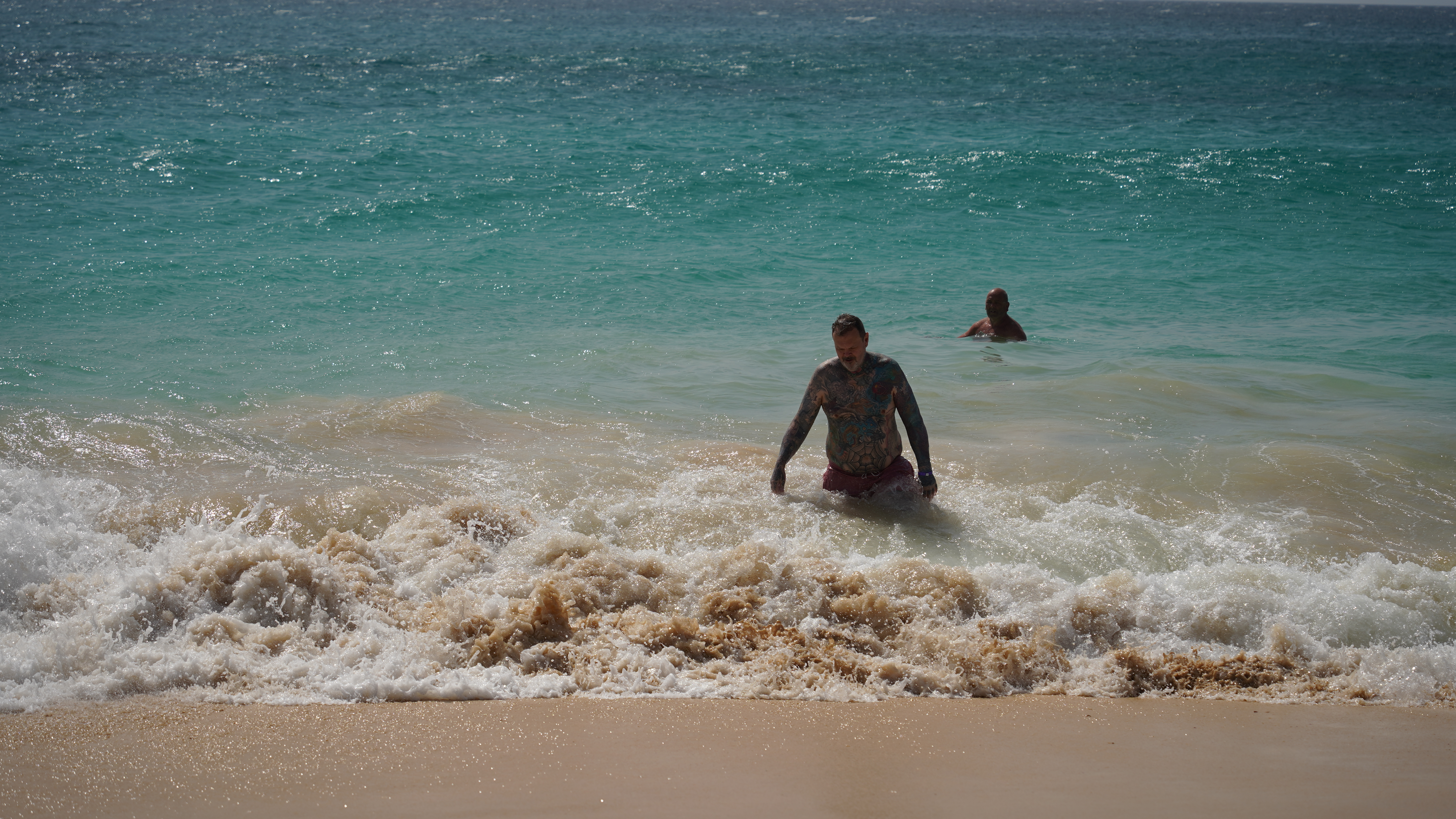
Boa Vista

Events in the year 2023 in Cape Verde.

== Incumbents ==
- President: José Maria Neves
- Prime Minister: Ulisses Correia e Silva

== Events ==
- Ongoing – COVID-19 pandemic in Cape Verde
- August - 2023 Cape Verde migrant boat disaster

== Sports ==
- 15 – January: Leg 1 and 2 of the 2023 The Ocean Race,
- 28 August: 2023 FIBA Basketball World Cup: Cape Verde win their first game at the world cup for the first time.
