= Miss West Africa =

Beauty pageant in West Africa

Miss West Africa is an international beauty pageant started in 2008 for females living in West Africa, as well as women of West African origin living around the world. Entry is via regional Miss West Africa competitions, with the winner of each contest then competing at the Miss West Africa Final. The first 2 competitions were held in London, and the event was held in Africa for the first time in the Gambia at the 2011 competition on 18 December 2011, which was won by Vanny Reis of Cape Verde.

Year	Winner	Country
2008	Amina Kamara	Sierra Leone
2009/10	Shireen Benjamin	Sierra Leone
2011/12	Vanny Reis	Cape Verde
