= 1957 in Cape Verde =

- Decades: 1930s; 1940s; 1950s; 1960s; 1970s
- See also: Other events of 1957; Timeline of Cabo Verdean history

The following lists events that happened during 1957 in Cape Verde.

== Incumbents ==
- Colonial governor:
  - Manuel Marques de Abrantes Amaral
  - António Augusto Peixoto Correia (acting governor)

== Births ==
- June 11: António Paris, footballer
