= 1983 in Cape Verde =

- Decades: 1960s; 1970s; 1980s; 1990s; 2000s
- See also: Other events of 1983; Timeline of Cabo Verdean history

The following lists events that happened during 1983 in Cape Verde.

== Incumbents ==
- President: Aristides Pereira
- Prime Minister: Pedro Pires

== Sports ==
- Académica Operária won the Cape Verdean Football Championship

== Births ==
- March 9: Edson Silva, footballer
- March 14: José Emílio Furtado, footballer
- June 10: Nélson Marcos, footballer
- September 20: Calú, footballer
