= 1992 in Cape Verde =

- Decades: 1970s; 1980s; 1990s; 2000s; 2010s
- See also: Other events of 1992; Timeline of Cabo Verdean history

The following lists events that happened during 1992 in Cape Verde.

== Incumbents ==
- President: António Mascarenhas Monteiro
- Prime Minister: Carlos Veiga

== Events ==
- The municipalities of São Filipe and Mosteiros were formed from the former municipality of Fogo
- Cape Verde ratified the UN treaties of Convention against Torture and Other Cruel, Inhuman or Degrading Treatment or Punishment and the Convention on the Rights of the Child
- IMPAR, an insurance company, established in Praia
- October 2: CFPES dissolved, ISE (Instituto Superior de Educação) established, now part of the University of Cape Verde

== Arts and entertainment ==
- March/April: the first edition of Festival de Gamboa took place on the beach in Praia
- November 15: Cesária Évora's album Mar Azul released

== Sports ==
- CS Mindelense won the Cape Verdean Football Championship

== Births ==
- January 10: Mailó, footballer
- March 22: Walter Tavares, basketball player
- March 25: Nuno Rocha, footballer
- July 24: Armando Freitas, footballer
