= 2021 in Cape Verde =

- Decades: 2000s; 2010s; 2020s
- See also: Other events of 2021; Timeline of Cabo Verdean history

Events in the year 2021 in Cape Verde.

== Incumbents ==
- President: Jorge Carlos Fonseca
- Prime Minister: Ulisses Correia e Silva

== Events ==
Ongoing — COVID-19 pandemic in Cape Verde

- 13 to 31 January – The Cape Verde men's national handball team competed in the World Championship for the first time, but had to withdraw from the event, as not having the required minimum of players available after several of the players tested positive for COVID-19.
- 21 January – Barlavento Court of Appeal authorizes house arrest for Venezuelan President Nicolás Maduro's alleged front man, Alex Saab.
- 18 April – Movement for Democracy maintains majority in Parliamentary elections.
- 15 June – The worst economic crisis in 45 years has left Cape Verde increasingly exposed to organised crime and money laundering that are undermining the country’s political stability and eroding its judicial independence. Based on a new investigation and risk assessment by PANGEA-RISK, the archipelago’s favourable rankings on global indexes no longer match the situation on the ground.

== The Alex Saab affair ==
- March 2021 – the Court of Justice of the Economic Community of West African States (ECOWAS) ordered the release of Mr Saab, directed the Cape Verdean government to pay him $200,000 as compensation for his “illegal arrest and detention” and “discontinue all proceedings and processes aimed at extraditing the Applicant to the USA”.
- June 2021 – ECOWAS Court dismissed Cape Verde’s motion to set aside judgment for release of Alex Saab
- June 2021 – the detention is judged an abuse of power by international observers
- July 2021 – a Venezuelan businessman close to Venezuelan President Nicolas Maduro is appealing a U.S. court decision to disregard his diplomatic immunity in a last-ditch effort to block his extradition to American soil over corruption charges.

== Scheduled events ==
- October – expected 2021 Cape Verdean presidential election

== Sports ==
- January 18 – Cape Verde is disqualified from the World Men's Handball Championship in Egypt after two players test positive for COVID-19.

== Deaths ==
- January 19 – Raúl Querido Várela, first President and longest serving member of the Supreme Court of Justice of Cape Verde.
