= 1945 in Cape Verde =

- Decades: 1920s; 1930s; 1940s; 1950s; 1960s
- See also: Other events of 1945; Timeline of Cabo Verdean history

The following lists events that happened during 1945 in Cape Verde.

== Incumbents ==
- Colonial governor: João de Figueiredo

== Births ==
- Paula Fortes, independence activist (d. 2011)
