= 1946 in Cape Verde =

- Decades: 1920s; 1930s; 1940s; 1950s; 1960s
- See also: Other events of 1946; Timeline of Cabo Verdean history

The following lists events that happened during 1946 in Cape Verde.

== Incumbents ==
- Colonial governor: João de Figueiredo

== Births ==
- Sérgio Ferreira, writer and filmmaker (d. 2006)
