= Terra Nova (newspaper) =

Media outlet in Cape Verde

- Type: Weekly
- Format: Insular
- Owner(s): N/A
- Founded: 1975
- Headquarters: Mindelo on the island of São Vicente, Cape Verde
- Website: https://terranova.cv/pt_PT/

Terra Nova (Portuguese meaning "New Land") is a Catholic newspaper and online media outlet in the island country of Cape Verde. Terra Nova is headquartered in Mindelo, the nation's second largest city and is one of the most circulated newspapers and dailies in Cape Verde as well as the island of São Vicente. It was founded in 1975 making it one of the oldest newspapers that ever existed in the country or the archipelago.

== Information ==
Terra Nova features sports, weather, businesses and more from the island as well as from Cape Verde. It features pages about news stories, newspaper pictures and sports online. It still remains to be one of the newspapers that is not linked to the World Wide Web.

== See also ==
- Newspapers in Cape Verde
