= Valter Borges =

Cape Verdean footballer (born 1988)

Personal information
- Full name: Valter Gazalanas Borges
- Date of birth: 9 November 1988 (age 37)
- Place of birth: São Vicente, Cape Verde
- Height: 1.81 m (5 ft 11 1/2 in)
- Position: Midfielder

Senior career*
| Years | Team | Apps | (Gls) |
| 2007–2008 | Batuque | ? | (?) |
| 2008–2010 | Santa Clara | 27 | (3) |
| 2011 | Ceuta | 2 | (0) |
| 2011–2012 | Alcalá | 0 | (0) |
| 2012–2014 | Batuque | 0 | (0) |
| 2014–... | Bravos do Maquis | 0 | (0) |

International career^{‡}
| 2009– | Cape Verde | 6 | (1) |
- * Club domestic league appearances and goals as of 17:13, 10 September 2010 (UTC) ‡ National team caps and goals as of 17:13, 10 September 2010 (UTC)

Valter Gazalanas Borges (born 9 November 1988) is a Cape Verdean international footballer who plays professionally as a midfielder.

== Career ==
Borges began his career for Batuque in the Cape Verde, before spending two seasons in Portugal with Santa Clara.

Borges made his international debut in August 2009, receiving a call-up for games against Angola and Malta. Borges earned a third cap in May 2010, in a 0-0 draw with Portugal.
