= Samir (Cape Verdean footballer) =

Cape Verdean-Portuguese footballer

Personal information
- Full name: Hélder Samir Lopes Semedo Fernandes
- Date of birth: 13 October 1988 (age 38)
- Place of birth: Praia, Cape Verde
- Height: 1.92 m (6 ft 4 in)
- Position: Forward

Team information
- Current team: Sertanense
- Number: 13

Youth career
- 2005–2006: Damaiense
- 2006–2008: Atlético CP

Senior career*
Years	Team	Apps	(Gls)
2008–2009	Murça		
2009–2010	Odivelas		
2010	Portosantense		
2011	Casa Pia		
2011	Oliveira de Frades	6	(0)
2012	1º Dezembro	11	(2)
2012	Bragança	11	(9)
2013	Feirense	12	(5)
2013	Académico de Viseu	0	(0)
2013–2014	Caldas	27	(5)
2014–2015	Bragança	29	(10)
2015–2016	Caudal		
2016–	Sertanense	5	(0)
- * Club domestic league appearances and goals as of 4 December 2015

Hélder Samir Lopes Semedo Fernandes (born 13 October 1988), known as Samir, is a Cape Verdean football player who plays for Sertanense. He also holds Portuguese citizenship.

== Club career ==
He made his professional debut in the Segunda Liga for Feirense on 23 January 2013 in a game against Leixões.
