= Ericson Silva =

Cape Verdean footballer

Ericson
Personal information
- Full name: Ericson Jorge Silva Rodrigues Duarte
- Date of birth: 25 November 1987 (age 38)
- Place of birth: São Vicente, Cape Verde
- Height: 1.88 m (6 ft 2 in)
- Position: Defensive midfielder

Team information
- Current team: Vilaverdense
- Number: 23

Senior career*
Years	Team	Apps	(Gls)
2008−2009	Chaves	12	(0)
2009−2010	Pinhalnovense	15	(0)
2010−2011	Merelinense	25	(1)
2011−2012	Mirandela	27	(1)
2012−2014	Tondela	33	(0)
2014−2015	Vitória Setúbal	8	(0)
2015	→ Chaves (loan)	12	(0)
2015–2017	Aves	73	(4)
2017–2019	Arouca	48	(1)
2019–2021	Vizela	49	(2)
2021–2022	Académico Viseu	23	(0)
2022–	Vilaverdense	48	(1)

International career^{‡}
2007–	Cape Verde	3	(0)
- * Club domestic league appearances and goals as of 20 June 2024 ‡ National team caps and goals as of 30 March 2021

Ericson Jorge Silva Rodrigues Duarte (born 25 November 1987), known simply as Ericson, is a Cape Verdean professional footballer who plays as a defensive midfielder for Liga Portugal 2 club Länk FC Vilaverdense.

== Club career ==
Born in São Vicente, Ericson spent his entire professional career in Portugal, starting out at G.D. Chaves in the third division. In the Segunda Liga, he represented C.D. Tondela, Chaves, C.D. Aves, F.C. Arouca, F.C. Vizela, Académico de Viseu F.C. and Länk FC Vilaverdense.

Ericson's only season in the Primeira Liga was 2014–15, in service of Vitória de Setúbal. He played his first match in the competition on 24 August 2014, in a 2–0 home win against Gil Vicente F.C. where he came on as a 46th-minute substitute for Jucie Lupeta.
