= Isaura Gomes =

Pharmacist, politician, and women's rights activist

Isaura Tavares Gomes (born 1944) is a Cape Verdean pharmacist, politician and women's rights activist. Representing the African Party for the Independence of Guinea and Cape Verde, she was the first and only woman to become a deputy following Cape Verde's independence in 1975 and the country's first female mayor when she was elected mayor of São Vicente in 2004.
