= 1973 Portuguese Cape Verdean Legislative Assembly election =

Elections to a Legislative Assembly were held for the first and only time in Portuguese Cape Verde in March 1973.

== Background ==
On 2 May 1972 the Portuguese National Assembly passed the Organic Law for the Overseas Territories, which provided for greater autonomy for overseas territories. Cape Verde was to have a 21-member Legislative Assembly.

Candidates were required to be Portuguese citizens who had lived in Cape Verde for more than three years and be able to read and write Portuguese. Voters were required to be literate. As the Portuguese constitution banned political parties at the time, the majority of candidates were put forward by the ruling People's National Action movement, although some civic associations were allowed to nominate candidates.

== Results ==
Out of a total population of 272,071, only 25,521 people registered to vote. A total of 20,942 people voted, giving a voter turnout of 82.1%.
