= 2018 in Cape Verde =

- Decades: 1990s; 2000s; 2010s; 2020s
- See also: Other events of 2018; Timeline of Cabo Verdean history

The following lists events that happened during 2018 in Cape Verde.

== Incumbents ==
- Presidents: Jorge Carlos Fonseca
- Prime Minister: José Ulisses Correia e Silva

== Sports ==
- Académica da Praia won the Cape Verdean Football Championship

== Deaths ==
- 3 March: Ivone Ramos, writer (b. 1926)
