= José Rui =

Cape Verdean footballer (born 1964)

Personal information
- Full name: José Rui de Pina Aguiar
- Date of birth: 6 November 1964 (age 61)
- Place of birth: Praia, Cape Verde
- Height: 1.88 m (6 ft 2 in)
- Position: Centre-back

Senior career*
Years	Team	Apps	(Gls)
1986–1990	União Santiago		
1990–1992	O Elvas	33	(1)
1992–1993	União Leiria	32	(5)
1993–1995	Belenenses	23	(0)
1995–2000	Vitória Setúbal	71	(4)
2000–2002	Desportivo Beja		
Total		159	(10)

International career
2000	Cape Verde	1	(0)
- * Club domestic league appearances and goals

José Rui de Pina Aguiar (born 6 November 1964), known as José Rui, is a Cape Verdean retired footballer who played as a central defender, and is the current assistant coach of the Cape Verde national team.

== Career ==
Born in Praia, José Rui started playing organized football at nearly 23 years of age, and spent his entire professional career in Portugal, his first club being União Sport Clube in the second division. He subsequently represented O Elvas C.A.D. and U.D. Leiria, competing in the second and third levels from 1990 to 1993.

José Rui made his debut in the Primeira Liga in the 1993–94 season, starting in 18 of his 21 appearances to help C.F. Os Belenenses finish in 13th position. After another campaign he moved to Vitória de Setúbal, helping to promotion from division two in his first year.

José Rui retired in June 2002 at almost 38, after two seasons with amateurs C.D. Beja. For several years he acted as assistant to the Cape Verde national team, being in charge for the friendly with Portugal on 27 May 2006 after Carlos Alhinho's resignation.
