= 1951 in Cape Verde =

- Decades: 1930s; 1940s; 1950s; 1960s; 1970s
- See also: Other events of 1951; Timeline of Cabo Verdean history

The following lists events that happened during 1951 in Cape Verde.

== Incumbents ==
- Colonial governor: Carlos Alberto Garcia Alves Roçadas

== Events ==
- June: Portuguese Cape Verde became an overseas province
- June 12: eruption of Pico do Fogo

== Births ==
- April 26: António do Espírito Santo Fonseca, politician
