= 1952 in Cape Verde =

- Decades: 1930s; 1940s; 1950s; 1960s; 1970s
- See also: Other events of 1952; Timeline of Cabo Verdean history

The following lists events that happened during 1952 in Cape Verde.

== Incumbents ==
- Colonial governor: Carlos Alberto Garcia Alves Roçadas

== Events ==
- The Portuguese colonial administration proposed settling 15,000 people from Cape Verde to the island of São Tomé
- Seminary of São José opened in the former Lazareto in Praia

== Births ==
- January 17: Basílio Ramos, politician
- April 17: Jorge Borges, politician and foreign minister
- May 17: Leonel Almeida, singer
- July 14: Nelson Nunes Lobo, painter
- October 2: Vera Duarte, politician
