= 1955 in Cape Verde =

- Decades: 1930s; 1940s; 1950s; 1960s; 1970s
- See also: Other events of 1955; Timeline of Cabo Verdean history

The following lists events that happened during 1955 in Cape Verde.

== Incumbents ==
- Colonial governor: Manuel Marques de Abrantes Amaral

== Events ==
- Rádio Barlavento in Mindelo begins broadcasting
