= 1994 in Cape Verde =

- Decades: 1970s; 1980s; 1990s; 2000s; 2010s
- See also: Other events of 1994; Timeline of Cabo Verdean history

The following lists events that happened during 1994 in Cape Verde.

== Incumbents ==
- President: António Mascarenhas Monteiro
- Prime Minister: Carlos Veiga

== Sports ==
- CD Travadores of Praia won the Cape Verdean Football Championship

== Births ==
- June 6: Kevin Sousa
- July 15: Jimmy Ines, footballer
- September 1:
  - Ká Semedo, footballer
  - Lidiane Lopes, athlete
