= Expresso das Ilhas =

Cape Verdean weekly newspaper

- Type: Weekly
- Format: National
- President: António Moreiro (as director)
- Editor-in-chief: João do Rosario
- Editor: Elga Furtado
- Founded: 1991; 34 years ago
- Headquarters: Praia - Achada de Santo António; Av. ONU 21, Cape Verde
- Website: www.expressodasilhas.cv

Expresso das Ilhas (Portuguese for "The Islands' Express") is a weekly Cape Verdean newspaper that covers its top stories in the archipelago and local stories from each island. The newspaper is located in the Cape Verdean capital city of Praia and has one of the largest circulations in Cape Verde. The newspaper is published in Portuguese, apart from some occasional articles in Cape Verdean Creole. Its current editor-in-chief is João Augusto do Rosário.' Its daily circulation are around 10,000, it costs 100 per copy as of 2010. The newspaper is also available on the Internet.

== Description ==
The newspaper is close to the Movement for Democracy (MPD) political party.

The logo of the newspaper features a navy and light blue wave on the left.

The paper is also in circulation outside the country, its daily circulation of the paper is 4,000 in Portugal and 1,000 in Angola.

== Sections ==
Expresso das Ilhas features sports, weather, businesses, entertainment and sports.

== History ==
Together with A Semana, Expresso das Ilhas was founded in 1991. The newspaper celebrated its 10th anniversary in 2001 and recently its 25th anniversary in 2016.

== Editors ==
- Chissana Magalhães
- Dulcina Mendes

== See also ==
- Newspapers in Cape Verde
