= Carla Sousa =

Cape Verdean basketball player

Personal information
- Born: October 26, 1976 (age 50) Sal, Cape Verde

Carla Maria Silva Sousa (born October 26, 1976) is a former Cape Verdean female basketball player.
