= Bijou (footballer) =

Cape Verdean footballer (born 1986)

Personal information
- Full name: Davidson Renato da Cruz Coronel
- Date of birth: 14 April 1986 (age 40)
- Place of birth: Praia, Cape Verde
- Height: 1.79 m (5 ft 10 1/2 in)
- Position: Central midfielder

Youth career
- Sporting Praia
- 2004–2005: Benfica

Senior career*
Years	Team	Apps	(Gls)
2005–2007	Benfica B	9	(0)
2006–2007	→ Gondomar (loan)	1	(0)
2007–2008	Fátima	1	(0)
2008–2009	Pinhalnovense	19	(0)
2009–2012	Fafe	72	(0)
2012–2013	Arouca	23	(1)
2013–2014	Atlético	15	(0)
2014–2016	Varzim	34	(1)
2016	Benfica Castelo Branco	8	(0)
Total		182	(2)
- * Club domestic league appearances and goals

Davidson Renato da Cruz Coronel (born 14 April 1986), known as Bijou, is a Cape Verdean former footballer who played as a central midfielder. He spent his entire professional career in Portugal.

== Club career ==
Bijou was born in Praia. After being spotted at local Sporting Clube da Praia by scouts from S.L. Benfica he moved to Portugal, playing his first year as a senior with the reserve side in the third division.

Benfica B folded after that season and Bijou was loaned, alongside teammate Nicolás Canales, to Gondomar S.C. of the second level, where he only played one league game. Released by his parent club in the summer of 2007, he met the same fate at his next team, C.D. Fátima in the same tier, having to resume his career in the lower leagues of the country.

On 29 March 2017, nearly one year after leaving his last club, Sport Benfica e Castelo Branco, Bijou announced his retirement at the age of 30.
