= 1938 in Cape Verde =

- Decades: 1910s; 1920s; 1930s; 1940s; 1950s
- See also: Other events of 1938; Timeline of Cabo Verdean history

The following lists events that happened during 1938 in Cape Verde.

== Incumbents ==
- Colonial governor: Amadeu Gomes de Figueiredo

== Births ==
- February 24: Manuel de Novas (d. 2009), poet and composer
- November 1: Manuel Figueira, artist
