= 1947 in Cape Verde =

- Decades: 1920s; 1930s; 1940s; 1950s; 1960s
- See also: Other events of 1947; Timeline of Cabo Verdean history

The following lists events that happened during 1947 in Cape Verde.

== Incumbents ==
- Colonial governor: João de Figueiredo

== Events ==
- Famine in Cape Verde - The second of three severe droughts in Cape Verde, following 1940-1942 and preceding 1956–1958, which led to famine through the islands. Starving refugees from across the islands were interned at a camp outside Praia, where they died by the hundreds.
