= 2016 in Cape Verde =

- Decades: 1990s; 2000s; 2010s; 2020s
- See also: Other events of 2016; Timeline of Cabo Verdean history

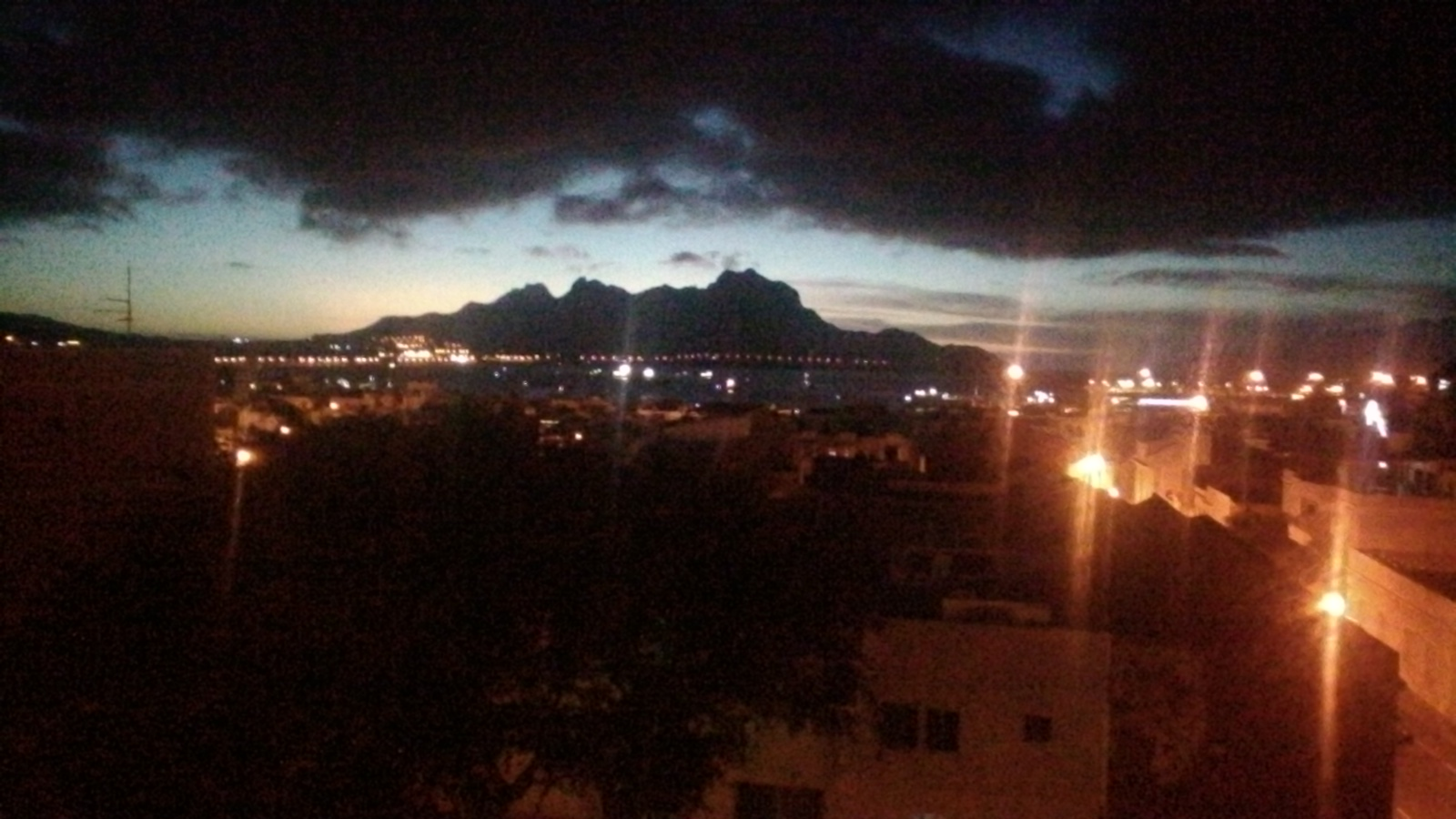
Mindelo is a large city in Cape Verde.

The following lists events that happened during 2016 in Cape Verde.

== Incumbents ==
- President: Jorge Carlos Fonseca
- Prime Minister: José Maria Neves (until 22 June), José Ulisses Correia e Silva (from 22 June)

== Events ==
- January 20: Tarrafal camp museum in Santiago Island opened by Prime Minister José Maria Neves and the Portuguese Premier António Costa
- March 20: the 2016 parliamentary election took place
- April 20: Jorge Pedro Mauricio dos Santos president of the National Assembly
- April 22: Ulisses Correia e Silva Prime Minister of Cape Verde
- June 22: The current Correia e Silva cabinet begins
- September: The Prime Minister and members of his government met with the IMF to discuss the 2016 Article IV consultation.
- September 4: the 2016 municipal elections took place
- October 2: the 2016 presidential elections took place, President Jorge Carlos Fonseca was re-elected

== Sports ==
- CS Mindelense won the Cape Verdean Football Championship

== Deaths ==
- September 16: António Mascarenhas Monteiro (b. 1944), politician and Prime Minister
