= 2023 Cape Verde migrant boat disaster =

2023 deaths on fishing boat off West Africa

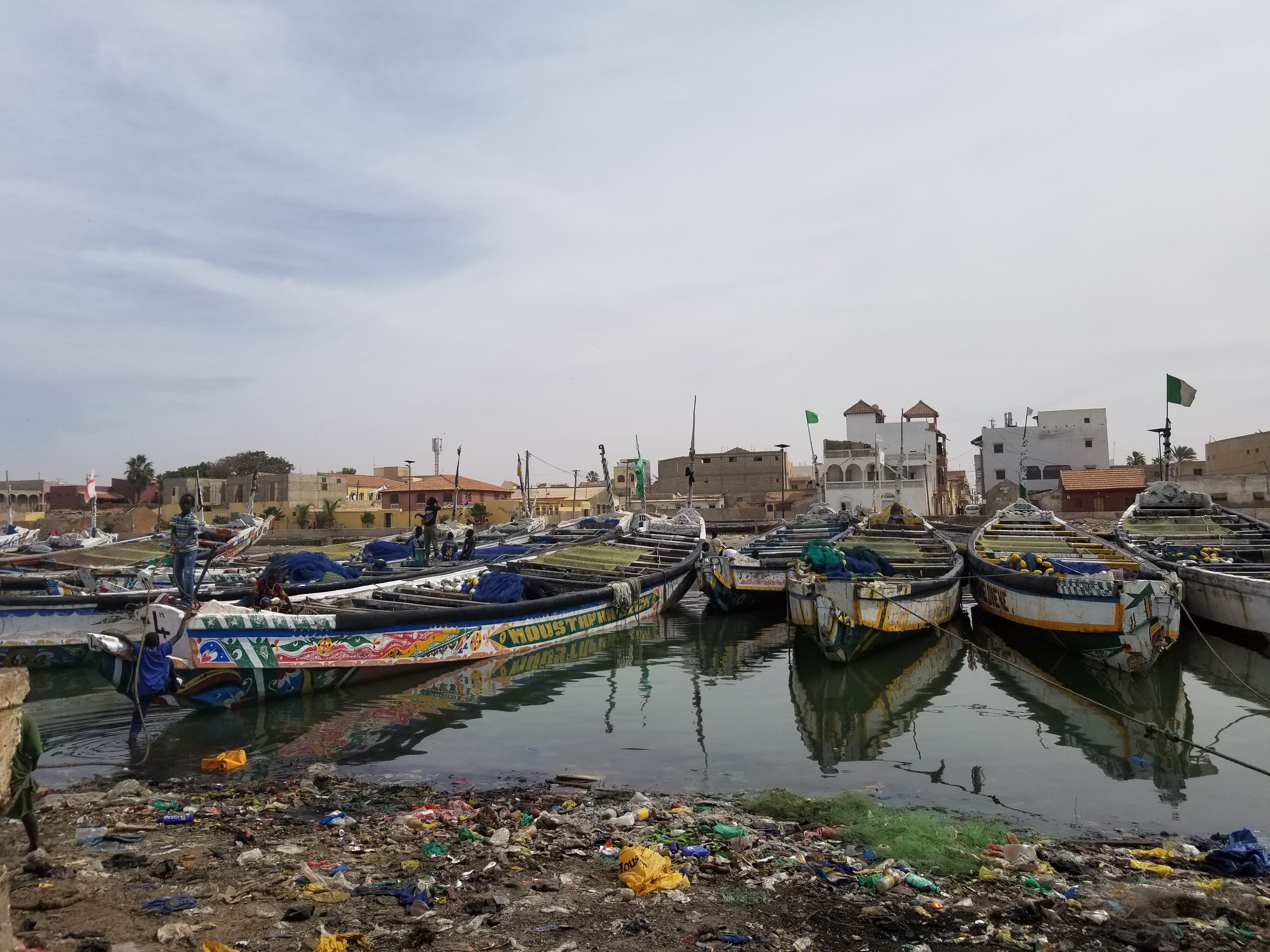
- Typical larger pirogues in northern Senegal
- Date: 10 July 2023
- Location: Cape Verde
- Type: Maritime disaster
- Participants: 101
- Deaths: 7
- Missing: 56

Up to 63 migrants died in an incident off Cape Verde involving a pirogue which had voyaged from Senegal departing on 10 July. 38 persons from the boat were rescued on 14 August 2023 and taken to the island of Sal, Cape Verde.

Most of those on board were from the town of Fass Boye (Fass Boue) in Senegal, with two from Guinea-Bissau.

== Route ==
The vessel set out from Fass Boye, some 80 kilometres (50 mi) along the coast northeast of Dakar, on 10 July, intending to head for the Canary Islands, with 101 ('over 120' by one source) persons estimated to have been on board. On 20 July, concerned relatives contacted the Spanish NGO Colectivo Caminando Fronteras (lit. "Walking Borders Collective"), who in turn alerted the authorities in Senegal, Mauritania, Morocco and Spain. The boat was eventually found, about 150 nautical miles north-east of the island of Sal, by the Spanish fishing boat Zillarri, operated by the tuna fishing company Pevasa, on 14 August. By then, 45 people were aboard, 38 survivors and 7 dead.

== Aftermath ==
On Monday 21 August, 37 of the 38 survivors were repatriated from Cape Verde to Senegal. The remaining survivor was insufficiently recovered for travel at that stage. In Senegal, difficult economic conditions and especially dwindling fish stocks were blamed for the disaster.

== External source ==
Image of the pirogue during rescue
