= Maria Helena Semedo =

Cape Verde economist and politician

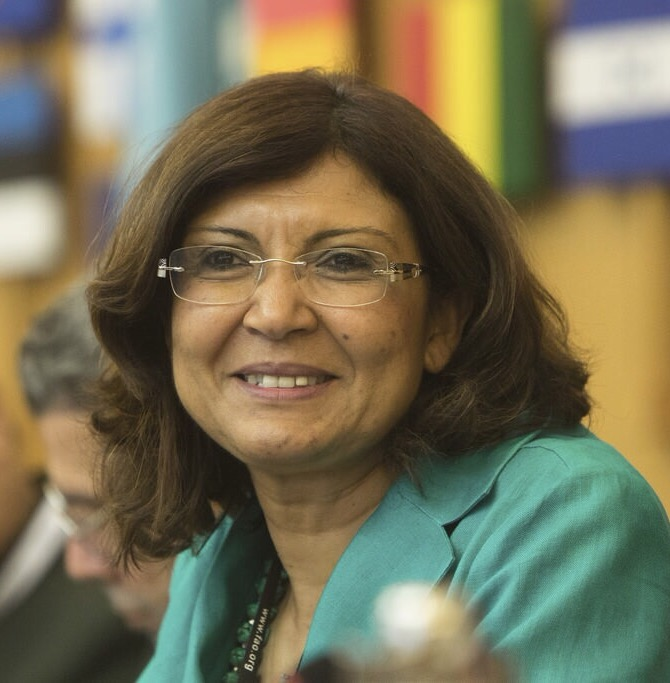

Deputy Director-General of the Food and Agriculture Organization (FAO)
- In office June 2013 – June 2017

Personal details
- Born: 29 May 1959 (age 67) Cape Verde
- Profession: Economist

Maria Helena Semedo (born 29 May 1959) is a Cape Verde economist and politician who served as Deputy Director-General of the Food and Agriculture Organization.

== Early life and education ==
Semedo was born on 29 May 1959 in Cape Verde. She has a masters in economics from the Higher Institute of Economics and Management in Lisbon, Portugal.

== Career ==
Semedo worked as an economist for the Bank of Cape Verde from 1986 to 1991 and for the Ministry of Planning and Cooperation from 1991 to 1993.

Semedo was appointed as Minister of Fishers, Agriculture and Rural Development in 1993, making her the first female cabinet minister in Cape Verde. In 1995, she became Minister of Maritime Affairs, then in 1998 Minister of Tourism. She was elected to the National Assembly in 2001, serving until 2003. During this period she was vice president of the United Nations Economic Commission for Africa.

Semedo joined the FAO in 2003 as a representative in Niger. She was appointed Deputy Regional Representative for Africa in 2008. In 2009, she was appointed Assistant Director-General in the regional office for Africa in Accra, Ghana. In June 2013, José Graziano da Silva, Director General of the FAO, appointed her Deputy Director-General and Coordinator of Natural Resources and served there till 2017.

At a speech in Rome in 2014, Semedo alleged that if current rates of degradation continue, all of the world's topsoil could be gone within 60 years. This was an influential claim that has been frequently repeated, but appears to lack any basis in science. In 2015, she noted that agriculture is often seen as a threat in the fight against climate change, but that the sector needs "to be integrated in climate policies." At the signing of the Paris Agreement in 2016, she spoke about the crucial role agriculture can play in addressing climate change as well as poverty and hunger. In January 2017 she called for an immediate response to drought in the Horn of Africa, telling a panel at the 28th African Union Summit in Addis Ababa, "The magnitude of the situation calls for scaled up action and coordination at national and regional levels."

== Personal life ==
Semedo is married. She speaks Portuguese, French, English and Spanish. In December 2015, while in Kenya, she contracted the Zika virus but recovered well.

== Awards and honors ==
- Order of the Niger for "distinguished service to the field of agriculture", May 2008

== Publications ==
- Semedo, Maria Helena (30 July 2010). "Human catastrophe looming". Mail and Guardian.
- Semedo, Maria Helena (2012). "Message to Readers" (PDF). Nature and Faune. 26 (2): 1–2.
- Semedo, Maria Helena (26 November 2015). "Global Bioeconomy Summit Statement" (PDF).
