= Arnaldo Carlos de Vasconcelos França =

Cape Verdean politician and economist (1925–2015)

Arnaldo Carlos de Vasconcelos França (December 15, 1925 – August 18, 2015) was a Cape Verdean politician, economist and historian.

== Life and career ==
França was born December 15, 1925 in Praia, to Dulce Monteiro Vieira de Vasconcelos and Arnaldo de França Castro e Moura.

He served as the minister of finance, between 1990 and 1991.

He was also revered as a historian and literary critic, publishing sobre poesia e ficção cabo-verdianas in 1962.

He died August 18, 2015, aged 89.
