= Amaro Alexandre da Luz =

Cape Verdean politician and economist (1932–2019)

Amaro Alexandre da Luz (June 4, 1932 – October 4, 2019) was a Cape Verdean politician and economist.

== Life and career ==
Amaro Alexandre da Luz was born June 4, 1932 on Santo Antão. He was the first minister of finance between 1975 and 1977. He also served as Cape Verde's ambassador to the United Nations from 1977 to 1984.

He was head of the Central Bank of Cape Verde from 1984 to 1991.

In 2012, he was awarded the official title "Co-founder of the First Republic of Cape Verde" by then Prime Minister José Maria Neves, along with twelve others.

He died in Praia October 4, 2019, aged 85.
