= 1936 in Cape Verde =

- Decades: 1910s; 1920s; 1930s; 1940s; 1950s
- See also: Other events of 1936; Timeline of Cabo Verdean history

The following lists events that happened during 1936 in Cape Verde.

== Incumbents ==
- Colonial governor: Amadeu Gomes de Figueiredo

== Events ==
=== March ===
- The literary review Claridade was first published
