= 2017 in Cape Verde =

- Decades: 1990s; 2000s; 2010s; 2020s
- See also: Other events of 2017; Timeline of Cabo Verdean history

The following lists events that happened during 2017 in Cape Verde.

== Incumbents ==
- Presidents: José Ulisses Correia e Silva
- Prime Minister: Jorge Carlos Fonseca

== Events ==
- August: restructuring of national airline TACV, in cooperation with the Icelandair Group. Binter CV took over inter-island flights

== Sports ==
- Sporting Praia won the Cape Verdean Football Championship
