= Cape Verde–Senegal Maritime Delimitation Treaty =

Cape Verde – Senegal Maritime Delimitation Treaty
Treaty on the delimitation of the maritime frontier between the Republic of Cape Verde and the Republic of Senegal
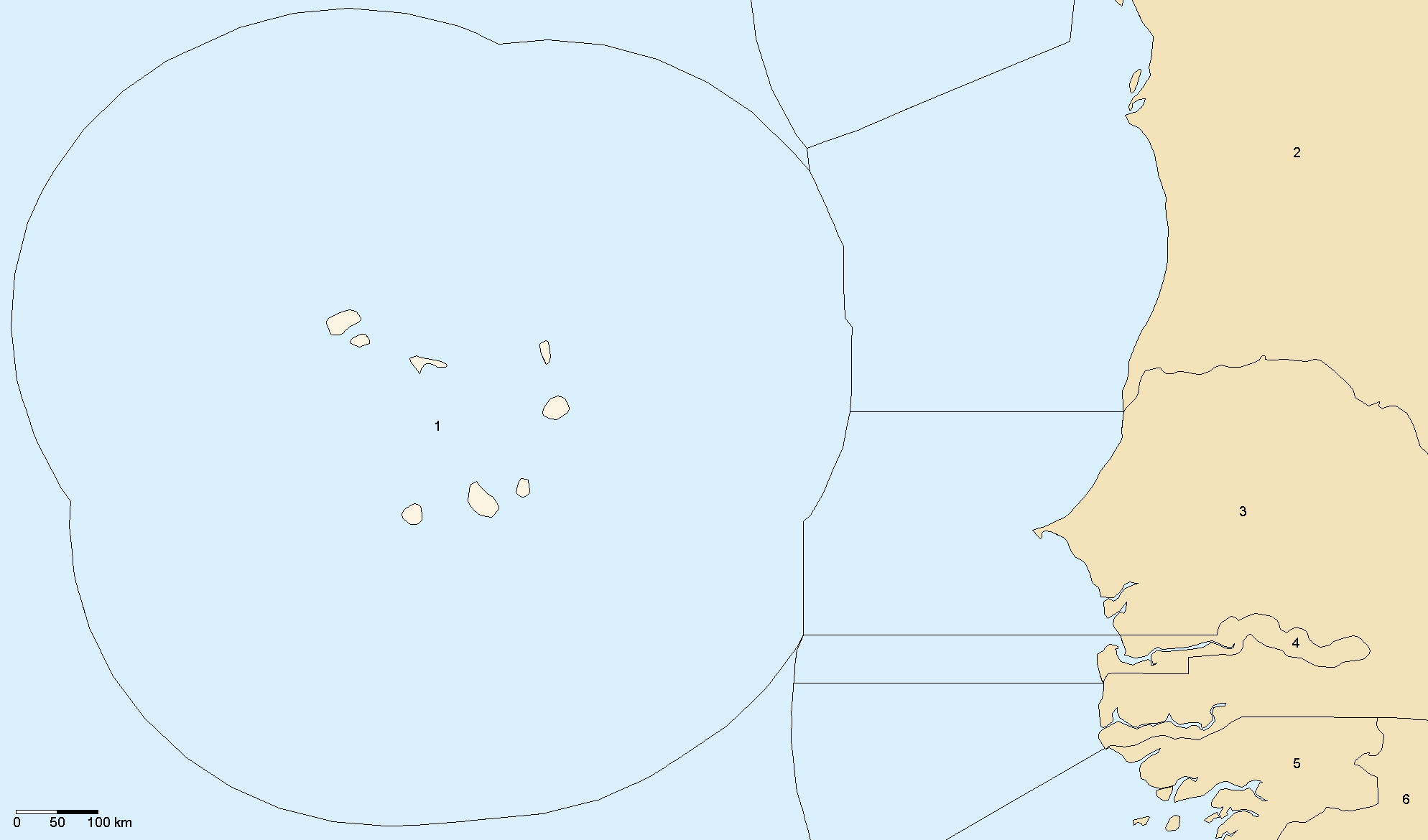
- Maritime boundaries of Cape Verde, Mauritania, and neighboring countries.
- Type: Boundary delimitation
- Signed: 17 February 1993
- Parties: Cape Verde; Senegal
- Depositary: United Nations Secretariat
- Languages: French; Portuguese

The Cape Verde – Senegal Maritime Delimitation Treaty is a treaty between Cape Verde and Senegal in which the two states agreed to the delimitation of their maritime boundary.

The treaty was signed on February 17, 1993. The boundary set out by the text of the treaty identifies a line which trends north–south for approximately 150 nm. in seven maritime segments defined by eight specific coordinate points. The boundary lies approximately 9 nm. to 20 nm. east of an equidistant line between the two territories.

The official name for the treaty is Treaty on the Delimitation of the Maritime Frontier between the Republic of Cape Verde and the Republic of Senegal.
