= Mikoyam Tavares =

Cape Verdean footballer

Mikó
Personal information
- Full name: Leonid Mikoyam Fernandes Tavares
- Date of birth: March 16, 1981 (age 45)
- Place of birth: Praia, Cape Verde
- Height: 1.76 m (5 ft 9 in)
- Position: Forward

Team information
- Current team: Praia Milfontes

Senior career*
Years	Team	Apps	(Gls)
2000–2005	Vasco Gama Sines		
2005–2008	Estoril	17	(0)
2006–2007	→ Odivelas (loan)	14	(1)
2008	Olivais Moscavide	9	(0)
2009–2010	Aljustrelense	43	(12)
2010	Akritas Chlorakas	4	(0)
2011–2012	Vasco Gama Sines	44	(7)
2013–	Praia Milfontes		
- * Club domestic league appearances and goals

Leonid Mikoyam Fernandes Tavares (born 16 March 1981 in Praia, Santiago), a.k.a. Mikó, is a Cape Verdean footballer who plays for Praia Milfontes as a forward.
