= 2024 in Cape Verde =

- Decades: 2000s; 2010s; 2020s
- See also: Other events of 2024; Timeline of Cabo Verdean history

Events from the year 2024 in Cape Verde.

== Incumbents ==
- President: José Maria Neves
- Prime Minister: Ulisses Correia e Silva

== Events ==
- 12 January – The World Health Organization officially certifies Cape Verde as malaria-free for the first time in 50 years.
- 5-8 February – Cape Verde hosts the Baseball5 African Championship in Praia. Tunisia wins, South Africa are runners-up, and Cape Verde takes bronze.
- 4 August – Daniel Varela de Pina wins a bronze medal in Men's flyweight boxing, earning Cape Verde its first Olympic medal.
- 5 August – The 40th edition of the Festival de Baía das Gatas begins on São Vicente.
- 12 September – Tropical Storm Gordon forms near Cape Verde, about 990 miles (1,590 km) west-northwest, with winds of 40 mph (65 km/h).

== Holidays ==
- 1 January - New Year's Day
- 13 January - Democracy Day
- 20 January - Heroes' Day
- 1 May - Labour Day
- 1 June - Youth Day
- 5 July – Independence Day
- 15 August - Assumption Day
- 1 November - All Saints' Day
- 25 December - Christmas Day
