= 1953 in Cape Verde =

- Decades: 1930s; 1940s; 1950s; 1960s; 1970s
- See also: Other events of 1953; Timeline of Cabo Verdean history

The following lists events that happened during 1953 in Cape Verde.

== Incumbents ==
- Colonial governor:
  - Carlos Alberto Garcia Alves Roçadas
  - Manuel Marques de Abrantes Amaral

== Sports ==
- Académica do Mindelo won the first official Cape Verdean Football Championship

== Births ==
- Tchalé Figueira, artist
- Ana Firmino, singer
- May 21: Djô d'Eloy (d. 2005), singer
- December 1: Georgina Mello (d. 2023), economist, director-general of CPLP
