= Kiki Ballack =

Cape Verdean footballer (born 1990)

Personal information
- Full name: Luís Germano Pires Lopes de Almeida
- Date of birth: 18 May 1990 (age 36)
- Place of birth: Praia, Cape Verde
- Height: 1.83 m (6 ft 0 in)
- Position: Defensive midfielder

Team information
- Current team: Sintrense
- Number: 13

Youth career
- 2010: Boavista Praia

Senior career*
Years	Team	Apps	(Gls)
2010–2011	Santa Clara B		
2011–2012	Madalena	26	(1)
2012	UD Oliveirense	0	(0)
2012–2013	Leiria	19	(1)
2013–2014	Sertanense	30	(7)
2014–2015	Farense	24	(0)
2015–2016	Mafra	33	(1)
2016–2017	UD Oliveirense	27	(0)
2017–2018	Mafra	1	(0)
2018–	Sintrense	38	(3)
- * Club domestic league appearances and goals as of 22:04, 17 November 2019 (UTC)

Luís Germano Pires Lopes de Almeida (born 18 May 1990), commonly known as Kiki Ballack, is a Cape Verdean footballer who plays for Sintrense. He played in the Segunda Liga for Farense and Mafra.
