= 1950 in Cape Verde =

- Decades: 1930s; 1940s; 1950s; 1960s; 1970s
- See also: Other events of 1950; Timeline of Cabo Verdean history

The following lists events that happened during 1950 in Cape Verde.

== Incumbents ==
- Colonial governor: Carlos Alberto Garcia Alves Roçadas

== Events ==
- Population: 149,348

=== Sports ===
- CS Mindelense won the Cape Verdean Football Championship

== Births ==
- João Lopes Filho, professor, anthropologist, historian and writer
- June 4: Eddy Fort Moda Grog, singer
