= Tuga =

Cape Verdean footballer

Personal information
- Full name: Álvaro Semedo Vaz
- Date of birth: 2 April 1986 (age 40)
- Place of birth: Santiago, Cape Verde
- Height: 1.85 m (6 ft 1 in)
- Position: Winger

Youth career
- 2000–2005: Real Massamá

Senior career*
Years	Team	Apps	(Gls)
2005–2006	Real Massamá		
2006	Estoril	13	(4)
2006	Vitória Guimarães	0	(0)
2006–2007	Chaves	12	(0)
2007	Real Massamá	10	(1)
2007–2008	Odivelas	18	(1)
2008	Beira-Mar Monte Gordo	10	(3)
2008–2010	Atlético	49	(5)
2010–2014	Mafra	114	(19)
2014	Fátima	6	(0)
2014–2015	1º Dezembro	4	(0)
2016	Águias Moradal	8	(0)
- * Club domestic league appearances and goals as of 00:00, 16 May 2016 (UTC)

Álvaro Semedo Vaz (born 2 April 1986), more commonly known as Tuga, is a Cape Verdean footballer who played as a winger.
