= 1939 in Cape Verde =

- Decades: 1910s; 1920s; 1930s; 1940s; 1950s
- See also: Other events of 1939; Timeline of Cabo Verdean history

The following lists events that happened during 1939 in Cape Verde.

== Incumbents ==
- Colonial governor: Amadeu Gomes de Figueiredo

== Events ==
- Cape Verde's first major and international airport (current Amílcar Cabral International Airport in the island of Sal) was built by the Italian government
- CS Mindelense won the regional championship
