= 1948 in Cape Verde =

- Decades: 1920s; 1930s; 1940s; 1950s; 1960s
- See also: Other events of 1948; Timeline of Cabo Verdean history

The following lists events that happened during 1948 in Cape Verde.

== Incumbents ==
- Colonial governor: João de Figueiredo

== Events ==
- 1947-1948 Famine in Cape Verde: This famine followed a two-year famine from 1941 to 1943; combined deaths from these 1940s famines are estimated as 45,000 Cape Verdeans.

== Births ==
- Leão Lopes, director
- March 27: Manuel Veiga, writer
