= 1975 in Cape Verde =

- Decades: 1950s; 1960s; 1970s; 1980s; 1990s
- See also: Other events of 1975; Timeline of Cabo Verdean history

The following lists events that happened during 1975 in Cape Verde.

== Incumbents ==
- Portuguese Cape Verde:
  - Provincial high commissioner: Vicente Almeida d'Eça (until July 5)
- Republic of Cape Verde (July 5 and after):
  - President: Aristides Pereira
  - Prime Minister: Pedro Pires

== Events ==
- April 21: Paulino do Livramento Évora became the first Cape Verdean born bishop of Santiago de Cabo Verde
- June 30: the first Cape Verdean parliamentary elections took place
- July 5 - Cape Verde gained independence after over 500 years of Portuguese rule. The National Assembly elected Aristides Pereira as President and Pedro Pires as Prime Minister.

== Arts and entertainment ==
- Mindelo-based newspaper Terra Nova established
- March 12: The first transmission of television in the nation began under the name Televisão Experimental de Cabo Verde or TEVEC (now RTC)

== Births ==
- January 20: Boss AC, rapper
- February 3: Lito, footballer and manager
- November 5: Crispina Correia, basketball player
- November 10: Suzanna Lubrano, singer
- December 7: Mateus Lopes, footballer

== Deaths ==
- May 29: Sergio Frusoni (b. 1901), writer
