= 1965 in Cape Verde =

- Decades: 1940s; 1950s; 1960s; 1970s; 1980s
- See also: Other events of 1965; Timeline of Cabo Verdean history

The following lists events that happened during 1965 in Cape Verde.

== Incumbents ==
- Colonial governor: Leão Maria Tavares Rosado do Sacramento Monteiro

== Sports ==
- Académica da Praia won the Cape Verdean Football Championship
