= 1976 in Cape Verde =

- Decades: 1950s; 1960s; 1970s; 1980s; 1990s
- See also: Other events of 1976; Timeline of Cabo Verdean history

The following lists events that happened during 1976 in Cape Verde.

== Incumbents ==
- President: Aristides Pereira
- Prime Minister: Pedro Pires

== Sports ==
- CS Mindelense won the Cape Verdean Football Championship

== Births ==
- Gilyto, singer
- March 21: Carlos Pedro Silva Morais, nickname: Caló, footballer
- October 26: Carla Sousa, basketball player
