= 1940 in Cape Verde =

- Decades: 1920s; 1930s; 1940s; 1950s; 1960s
- See also: Other events of 1940; Timeline of Cabo Verdean history

The following lists events that happened during 1940 in Cape Verde.

== Incumbents ==
- Colonial governor: Amadeu Gomes de Figueiredo

== Events ==
- Population: 181,441
- The Mission sui juris of Portuguese Guinea was separated from the Catholic diocese of Santiago de Cabo Verde
