= A Semana =

Cape Verdean newspaper

- Primeiro diário caboverdiano em linha
- Type: Daily
- Format: National
- President: Alírio Dias de Pino
- Founded: 1991
- Headquarters: Praia, Cape Verde

A Semana (Portuguese meaning "The Week") is a Cape Verdean daily that covers its top stories in the archipelago and local stories ranging from each island. A Semana is located in the Cape Verdean capital city of Praia and is one of the most circulated newspapers and dailies in Cape Verde. Its slogan is the "First Capeverdean Daily (not often as Diary which is also translated in English, when it is to daily, it is not translated as) in Line" ("Primeiro diário caboverdiano em linha").

The newspaper is written in the Portuguese language, most or much of the articles are written in, some articles are also written in Capeverdean Creole. Online, recently, some of its articles can be found in English.

Its current price is 100 escudos.

== History ==
A Semana alongside Expresso das Ilhas were founded in 1991. Both are the second newspapers founded after the country's independence. The newspaper started out as weekly as the newspaper was named after. It became a daily paper and did not change its name.

The newspaper celebrated its 10th anniversary in 2001 and recently celebrated its 25th anniversary in 2016.

== Contents ==
A Semana also features sports, the main one is titled "Lance Desportivo" ("Sports Launch"), weather, businesses and entertainment. A Semana features a special section called "Kriolidadi" or "Kriolidade"; dedicated to Cape Verdean entertainment and culture, Kriolidadi is circulated weekly along with the rest of the newspaper. The front page is displayed on the top-left of its homepage. A Semana also features online news stories since 2006; these articles can be found at: asemana.publ.cv. News stories, newspaper pictures and sports from 2005 as well as Kriolidadi in pdf form with information and stories are available. The left section of the homepage features news from Cape Verde and its inhabited islands and the world, sports and weather from cities around the world. Also feature are the financial O Cifrão.

== Notable interviews ==
Notable interviews that A Semana has done during the years include an interview with Corsino Fortes in October 2013.

== Editors ==
- João Branco, theatrical actor - theatrical stories
- Sanny Fonseca
- Teresa Sofia Fortes
- Constânça de Pina

== Directors ==
- Filomena Silva (as of 2010)
- Alírio Dias de Pina (current)

== See also ==
- Newspapers in Cape Verde
- List of companies in Cape Verde
