= Vanny Reis =

- Born: 13 October 1985 (age 40); Mindelo, Cape Verde
- Height: 6 ft 0 in (1.83 m)
- Website: http://www.misswestafrica.com

Ivanilda (Vanny) Reis (born 13 October 1985 in Mindelo, Cape Verde) is the current holder of the titles Miss West Africa and Miss West Africa Cape Verde.

== Miss West Africa ==
As the official representative of Cape Verde for the 2011 Miss West Africa pageant held in Banjul, the Gambia on December 18, 2011, Vanny Reis captured the crown of Miss West Africa 2011/12, becoming the first woman to win an international pageant for Cape Verde.

Honorary titles
| Preceded by Shireen Benjamin | Miss West Africa; 2011/12 | Succeeded by Incumbent |
