= 1941 in Cape Verde =

- Decades: 1920s; 1930s; 1940s; 1950s; 1960s
- See also: Other events of 1941; Timeline of Cabo Verdean history

The following lists events that happened during 1941 in Cape Verde.

== Incumbents ==
- Colonial governor:
  - Amadeu Gomes de Figueiredo
  - José Diogo Ferreira Martins

== Events ==
- Famine in Cape Verde
