= Armando Freitas =

Cape Verdean footballer (born 1992)

Personal information
- Full name: Armando Conceição Freitas
- Date of birth: 24 July 1992 (age 34)
- Place of birth: Praia, Cape Verde
- Height: 1.72 m (5 ft 8 in)
- Position: Right-back

Team information
- Current team: Águias Moradal

Youth career
- 2010–2011: Marítimo

Senior career*
Years	Team	Apps	(Gls)
2012–2015	Marítimo B	99	(2)
2013	Marítimo	0	(0)
2015–	Águias Moradal	32	(3)
- * Club domestic league appearances and goals as of 14 August 2016

Armando Conceição Freitas (born 24 July 1992) is a Cape Verdean footballer who plays as a right-back for Marítimo B.

== Career ==
Freitas was born in Praia. On 12 August 2012, he made his professional debut with Marítimo B in a 2012–13 Segunda Liga match against Leixões.
