= António Augusto Peixoto Correia =

Portuguese colonial administrator

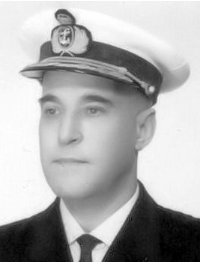
- Portrait of António Augusto Peixoto Correia

Colonial governor of Cape Verde
- In office 1957–1958
- Preceded by: Manuel Marques de Abrantes Amaral
- Succeeded by: Silvino Silvério Marques

Governor-general of Guinea-Bissau
- In office 1958–1962
- Preceded by: Álvaro Rodrigo da Silva Tavares
- Succeeded by: Vasco António Martins Rodrigues

Personal details
- Born: 11 October 1913 Vila Nova de Gaia, Portugal
- Died: 16 March 1988 (aged 74)

António Augusto Peixoto Correia (11 October 1913 – 16 March 1988) was a Portuguese colonial administrator, military officer and politician. He was born 11 October 1913 in Vila Nova de Gaia, a suburb of Porto in northern Portugal. He was a navy officer, and was governor of the District of Huíla in Angola in 1955. Between 1957 and 1958, he was governor of Cape Verde. He succeeded Manuel Marques de Abrantes Amaral and was succeeded by Silvino Silvério Marques.

He was governor of Portuguese Guinea (Guinea-Bissau) between 1958 and 1962. During his tenure as governor, the Pidjiguiti massacre took place, which started the Guinea-Bissau War of Independence. He was succeeded by Vasco António Martins Rodrigues. He was Minister of the Overseas from 4 December 1962 to 19 March 1965 under Prime Minister Salazar. He was vice-president of the Council of Overseas Territories from 1960 to 1970. He was member of the National Assembly of Portugal from 1965 until 1973. He died on 16 March 1988.

== See also ==
- List of colonial governors of Cape Verde
- List of governors of Portuguese Guinea

Preceded by Manuel Marques de Abrantes Amaral	Governor of Cape Verde; 1957-1958	Succeeded by Silvino Silvério Marques
Preceded by Álvaro Rodrigues da Silva Tavares	Governor of Portuguese Guinea; 1958-1962	Succeeded by Vasco António Martins Rodrigues
