= List of ministers of finance of Cape Verde =

List of ministers of finance of Cape Verde since independence:

- Amaro Alexandre da Luz, 1975–1977
- Osvaldo Lopes da Silva, 1977–1986
- Pedro Verona Rodrigues Pires, 1986–1990
- Arnaldo Carlos de Vasconcelos França, 1990–1991
- José Tomas Whanon de Carvalho Veiga, 1992–1995
- Úlpio Napoleão Fernandes, 1995–1997
- Gualberto do Rosário, 1997–1999
- Ulisses Correia e Silva, 1999–2001
- Carlos Augusto Duarte de Burgo, 2001–2003
- José Maria Neves, 2003–2004
- João António Pinto Serra, 2004–2006
- Cristina Lopes da Silva Monteiro Duarte, 2006–2016
- Olavo Correia, May 2016 – present

== See also ==
- Economy of Cape Verde
