= Sertanense F.C. =

Portuguese association football club

- Full name: Sertanense Futebol Clube
- Founded: 17 February 1934; 92 years ago
- Ground: Dr. Marques dos Santos, Sertã, Portugal
- Capacity: 4,500
- Chairman: Paulo Farinha
- Manager: Gonçalo Monteiro
- League: Campeonato de Portugal
- 2015–16: Relegation groups, Serie F, 4th
- Website: sertanensefutebolclube.blogspot.com
Home colours	Away colours

Sertanense Futebol Clube (Portuguese pronunciation: [sɨɾtɐˈnẽsɨ]), formerly Sertanense Foot-ball Club, is a Portuguese football club based in Sertã. Founded in 1934, it currently plays in the Campeonato de Portugal, holding home games at Campo de Jogos Dr. Marques dos Santos.

== History ==
The largest sports club of Sertã after Vitória de Sernache, in the Castelo Branco district, Sertanense was founded by Casimiro Farinha on 17 February 1934, eventually resorting exclusively to football, after devoting most of its energy to sport fishing, collecting some national trophies.

Twice district champion, in 1998 and 2000, it first reached the third level of national football in 2009. That summer, former Portugal U-20 goalkeeper José Bizarro – winner of the 1989 FIFA World Youth Championship – took charge of the team. In that and the previous season's domestic cup, the club faced first division club FC Porto, being ousted 0–4 on both occasions (one at home).

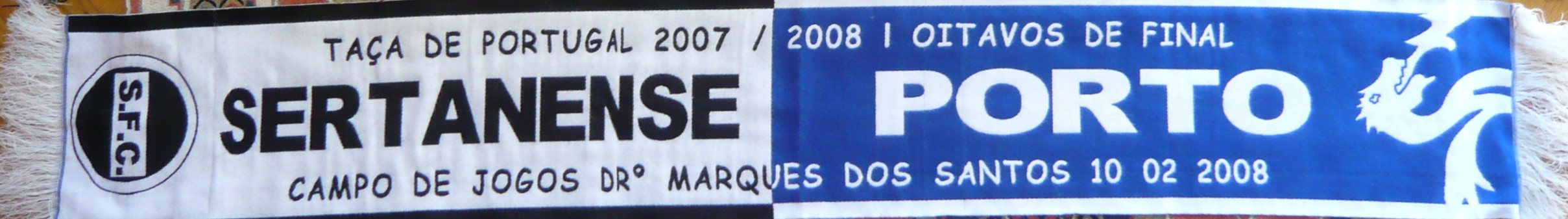
Scarf commemorating a match between FC Porto and Sertanense for the Portuguese Cup in 2008, at Dr. Marques dos Santos

== Current squad ==
As of 12 April 2020

Note: Flags indicate national team as defined under FIFA eligibility rules; some limited exceptions apply. Players may hold more than one non-FIFA nationality.

No.	Pos.	Nation	Player
1	GK	BRA	Raví
4	DF	POR	Pedro Machado
5	DF	GUI	Mohamed Kaba
8	MF	CPV	Kelvin Medina
9	MF	GNB	Grinood Costa
10	MF	POR	Mauro Santos
12	GK	BRA	Michel Oliveira
13	FW	CPV	Samir
14	MF	POR	André Romão

No.	Pos.	Nation	Player
15	MF	POR	Sérgio Oulu
16	GK	POR	Paulo Solgado
17	FW	ANG	Angola
20	MF	POR	Sandro Fernando
23	DF	CPV	Danilson Ribeira
26	DF	POR	Rúben Freire
30	DF	POR	André Ferreira
45	DF	POR	Tito Júnior

== Appearances ==
- Tier 3, Segunda Divisão: 3 (highest rank: 5th)
- Tier 4, Terceira Divisão: 18 (1 title)
- Taça de Portugal: 21

== Season to season ==
Season	Level	Division	Section	Place	Movements
2000–01	Tier 4	Terceira Divisão		11th	
2001–02	Tier 4	Terceira Divisão		2nd	Promoted
2002–03	Tier 3	Segunda Divisão		17th	Relegated
2003–04	Tier 4	Terceira Divisão		14th	
2004–05	Tier 4	Terceira Divisão		12th	
2005–06	Tier 4	Terceira Divisão		10th	
2006–07	Tier 4	Terceira Divisão		4th	
2007–08	Tier 4	Terceira Divisão		3rd	Promoted
2008–09		Terceira Divisão		1st	Promoted
2010–11	Tier 3	Segunda Divisão	Série Sul		

== Honours ==
- Castelo Branco District Championship
  - Champions (2): 1987–88, 1999–2000
- Terceira Divisão
  - Champions (1): 2008–09
