= COVID-19 pandemic in Cape Verde =

Ongoing COVID-19 viral pandemic in Cape Verde

- Disease: COVID-19
- Pathogen: SARS-CoV-2
- Location: Cape Verde
- Arrival date: 20 March 2020 (6 years, 7 months and 1 week)
- Confirmed cases: 64,550 (updated 18 September 2026)
- Deaths: 417 (updated 18 September 2026)

Government website
- COVID 19 — Corona Vírus - Official site about COVID-19 in Cape Verde

The COVID-19 pandemic in Cape Verde is part of the worldwide pandemic of coronavirus disease 2019 (COVID-19) caused by severe acute respiratory syndrome coronavirus 2 (SARS-CoV-2). The virus was confirmed to have reached Cape Verde in March 2020.

== Background ==
On 12 January 2020, the World Health Organization (WHO) confirmed that a novel coronavirus was the cause of a respiratory illness in a cluster of people in Wuhan, Hubei, China, which was reported to the WHO on 31 December 2019.

The case fatality ratio for COVID-19 has been much lower than SARS of 2003, but the transmission has been significantly greater, with a significant total death toll. Model-based simulations for Cape Verde suggest that the 95% confidence interval for the time-varying reproduction number R_{t} has been lower than 1.0 since August 2021.

== Timeline ==
=== March 2020 ===
- On 20 March, the first case of COVID-19 in the country was confirmed, being a 62-year-old foreigner from the United Kingdom.
- Two more cases were confirmed the following day on 21 March. Both cases were tourists, one from the Netherlands, aged 60, and one from United Kingdom, aged 62. These two cases and the previous one were all on Boa Vista island before testing positive. The first death was announced on 24 March, regarding the first confirmed case in Cape Verde.
- On 25 March, a fourth case was confirmed, a 43-year-old national citizen who had returned from Europe, being the first case detected in the country's capital, Praia, on Santiago island. On the following day, 26 March, Cape Verde's Health minister announced that the man's wife had also tested positive, thus being the first reported local transmission.
- Of the five confirmed cases in March, by the end of the month one person had died while four remained active cases.

=== March 2021 ===
Cape Verde is in negotiations with vaccine manufacturers. Courtesy of COVAX it received 24,000 doses of the Oxford–AstraZeneca COVID-19 vaccine on 12 March and 5,850 doses of the Pfizer–BioNTech COVID-19 vaccine on 14 March. Vaccinations commenced on 19 March. By the end of the month 3,699 vaccine doses had been administered.

=== Subsequent cases ===
- 2020 cases

There were 11,793 confirmed cases in 2020. 11,530 patients recovered while 112 persons died. At the end of 2020 there were 151 active cases.

- 2021 cases

Cape Verde's vaccination campaign began on 19 March.

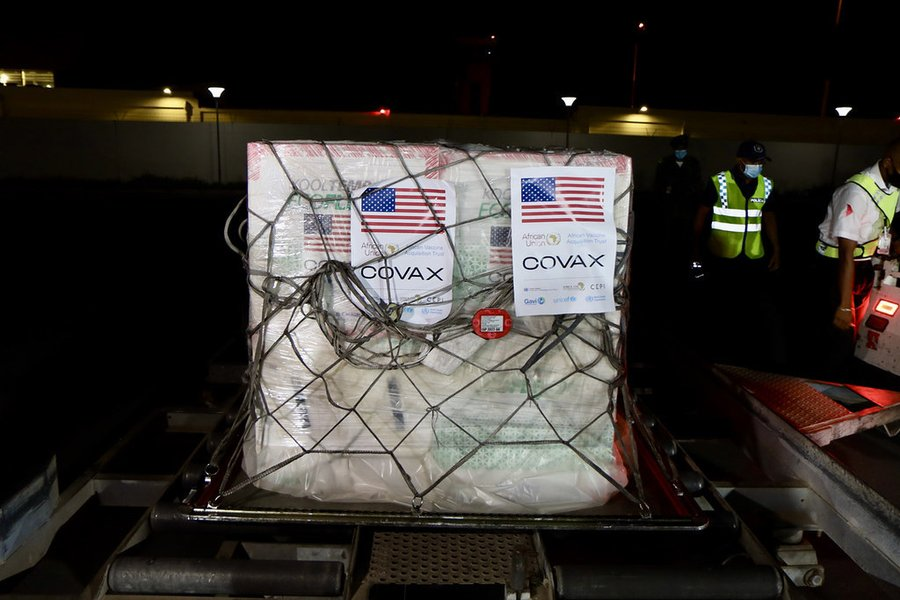
COVID-19 vaccines from the US arrive in Cape Verde as part of the COVAX program in 2021

There were 30,670 confirmed cases in 2021, bringing the total number of cases to 42,463. 26,782 patients recovered in 2021 while 240 persons died, bringing the total death toll to 351. At the end of 2021 there were 3,773 active cases.

Modelling by WHO's Regional Office for Africa suggests that due to under-reporting, the true number of infections by the end of 2021 was around 0.3 million while the true number of COVID-19 deaths was around 383.

- 2022 cases

Samples taken between May and October showed that the rapidly spreading BA.5.2.1.7 variant was present in Cape Verde.

There were 20,740 confirmed cases in 2022, bringing the total number of cases to 63,203. 24,421 patients recovered in 2022 while 58 persons died, bringing the total death toll to 410. At the end of 2022 there were 3 active cases.

- 2023 cases

There were 1,274 confirmed cases in 2023, bringing the total number of cases to 64,477. Seven persons died, bringing the total death toll to 417.

== Prevention ==
Since 16 March, tests are being made in Cape Verde rather than abroad by the Laboratório de Virologia de Cabo Verde, in Praia.

On 17 March, as a contingency measure, Prime Minister José Ulisses Correia e Silva announced a three-week suspension of all incoming flights from the US, Brazil, Senegal, Nigeria, Portugal, and all European countries affected by the coronavirus. Exceptions were made for cargo flights and flights for foreign citizens wishing to return home. The ban also applies to the docking of cruise ships, sailing ships and landing from passengers or crew from cargo ships or fishing ships. More exceptional measures were taken the day after, and the contingency level was raised on 27 March.

Cabo Verde Airlines had already taken the decision to suspend flights. Since 28 February the flights to Milan (Italy) are suspended. On 6 March, the flights to Lagos (Nigeria), Porto Alegre (Brazil) and Washington D.C. (United States) were also suspended. On 17 March, per to the Government's decision, Cabo Verde Airlines suspended all of its routes.

On March 28, for the first time in its history, a state of emergency was declared in Cape Verde, implementing a set of measures.

== See also ==
- COVID-19 pandemic in Africa
- COVID-19 pandemic by country and territory
- COVID-19 vaccination in Cape Verde
