= Silvino Silvério Marques =

Portuguese colonial administrator and general

Colonial governor of Cape Verde
- In office 1958–1962
- Preceded by: António Augusto Peixoto Correia
- Succeeded by: Leão Maria Tavares Rosado do Sacramento Monteiro

Colonial governor of Angola
- In office 5 November 1962 – 27 October 1966
- Preceded by: Venâncio Augusto Deslandes
- Succeeded by: Camilo Augusto de Miranda Rebocho Vaz

Colonial governor of Angola
- In office 15 June 1974 – 24 July 1974
- Preceded by: Fernando Augusto Santos Castro
- Succeeded by: António Alva Rosa Coutinho

Personal details
- Born: 23 March 1918 Nazaré
- Died: 1 October 2013 (aged 95) Lisbon

Silvino Silvério Marques (23 March 1918 – 1 October 2013) was a Portuguese colonial administrator and a general of the Portuguese Army. He was governor of Cape Verde from 1958 to 1962, and governor of Angola for two terms: from 1962 to 1966, and in 1974. He was administrator of the National Steel Industry from 1967 to 1970, interim director of Armed Engineers and 2nd Commander of the Military Region of Mozambique from 1971 to January 1973. In May 1974, he was installed by general António de Spínola as governor of Angola, but was removed from office after two months for not giving guarantees to follow instructions from the National Salvation Junta. He was retired into reserve in 1975.

He revived the following decorations:

- Officer of the Military Order of Avis of Portugal (14 January 1954)
- Commander of the Military Order of Avis of Portugal (27 September 1958)
- Grand Officer of the Order of the Colonial Empire (3 November 1963)

== See also ==
- List of colonial governors of Cape Verde
- List of colonial governors of Angola

Preceded by António Augusto Peixoto Correia	Colonial governor of Cape Verde; 1958-1962	Succeeded by Leão Maria Tavares Rosado do Sacramento Monteiro
Preceded by Venâncio Augusto Deslandes	Governor of Angola; 1962-1966	Succeeded by Camilo Augusto de Miranda Rebocho Vaz
Preceded by Joaquim Franco Pinheiro	Governor of Angola; 1974	Succeeded by António Alva Rosa Coutinho
