= Aristides Pereira =

Cape Verdean politician, President from 1975 to 1991

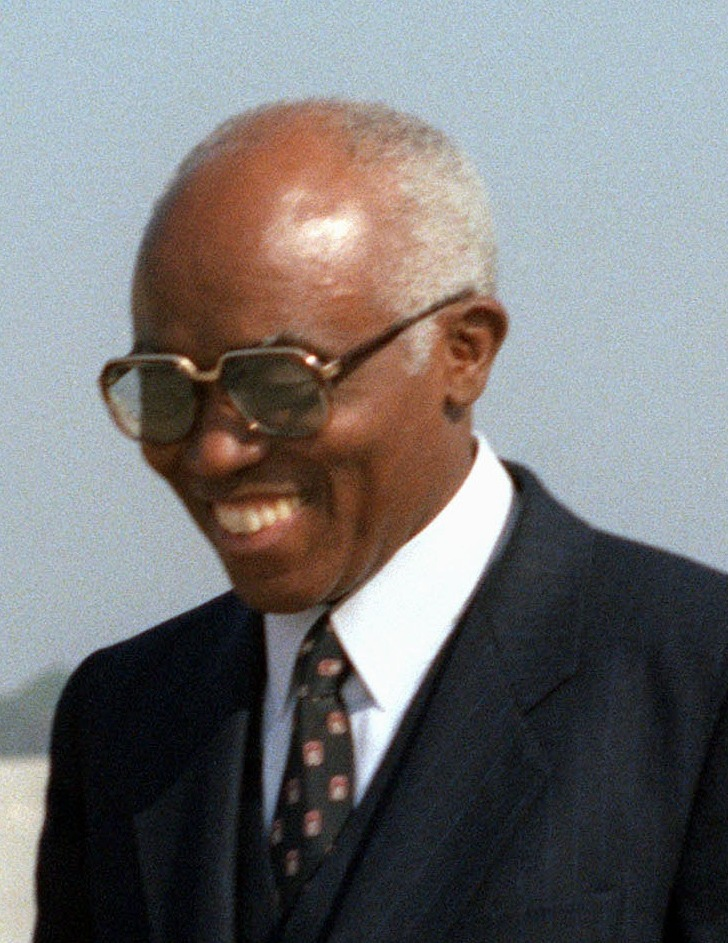
- Pereira in 1983

1st President of Cape Verde
- In office 8 July 1975 – 22 March 1991
- Prime Minister: Pedro Pires
- Preceded by: Office established
- Succeeded by: António Mascarenhas Monteiro

Personal details
- Born: 17 November 1923 Fundo das Figueiras, Boa Vista, Portuguese Cape Verde
- Died: 22 September 2011 (aged 87) Coimbra, Portugal
- Party: African Party for the Independence of Cape Verde (after 1981)
- Other political affiliations: African Party for the Independence of Guinea and Cape Verde (before 1981)
- Spouse: Carlina Fontes Pereira (?–2011; his death)

Aristides Maria Pereira (Portuguese pronunciation: [ɐɾiʃˈtidɨʒ mɐˈɾiɐ pɨˈɾejɾɐ]; 17 November 1923 – 22 September 2011) was a Cape Verdean politician. He was the first President of Cape Verde, serving from 1975 to 1991.

== Biography ==
Pereira was born in Fundo das Figueiras, on the island of Boa Vista. His first job was chief of telecommunications in Guinea-Bissau. From the late 1940s until Cape Verde's independence, Pereira was heavily involved in the anti-colonial movement, organizing strikes and rising through the hierarchy of his party, the African Party for the Independence of Guinea and Cape Verde (Partido Africano da Independência da Guiné e Cabo Verde, known as PAIGC). In clandestine activity he often used the pseudonym Alfredo Bangura.

On 19 September 1959, leaders of the PAIGC, including Pereira, Amilcar Cabral, Luís Cabral, Fernando Fortes and Rafael Barbosa, met in secret in the capital city Bissau, declaring a struggle against Portugal ‘by all possible means, including war’. This followed on from the Pidjiguti Massacre, which saw the murder of 50 striking dock workers by police officers.

Although Pereira initially promised to lead a democratic and socialist nation upon becoming president, he compounded the country's chronic poverty by crushing dissent following the overthrow of Luís Cabral, who was President of Guinea-Bissau and Pereira's ally in the drive to unite the two Lusophone states. However, Cape Verde had a much better human rights record than most countries in Africa and was known as one of the most democratic (despite the restriction on party activity) because of the power delegated to local citizens' committees and his own government was able to cope with the drought that hit the country. Cape Verde is one of the few African countries that never had the death penalty, in fact it was banned in 1983. While Guinea-Bissau remained close to the Soviet Union, Cape Verde maintained a policy of non-alignment.

On 14 November 1980, a coup, led by João Bernardo Vieira, overthrew Cabral and replaced the one-party regime with a Military Junta. In response to this, Pereira and his Prime Minister, Pedro Pires, cut diplomatic relations with Guinea-Bissau, dissolved the PAIGC and replaced it with the African Party for the Independence of Cape Verde, removing the name of Guinea. Guinea-Bissau and Cape Verde restored bilateral relations in 1982, when Mozambican President Samora Machel managed to bring together the two leaders (Vieira and Pereira) in Maputo, and a Cape Verdean ambassador was sent to Guinea-Bissau in 1983.

Another major difference between the two countries was the difference between the political tranquility of Cape Verde, which would later become multiparty in an extremely peaceful way, and the constant authoritarianism and strong instability in Guinea-Bissau.

The country's policies during Pereira's rule tended toward Cold War nonalignment and economic reforms to help the peasantry. Pedro Pires served as prime minister for the duration of Pereira's presidency.

After PAICV decided to introduce multiparty democracy in February 1990, Pereira stepped down as General Secretary of PAICV in July 1990 and was succeeded in that post by Pires. Pereira was the PAICV candidate in the February 1991 presidential election, but António Mascarenhas Monteiro defeated him by a large margin.

While hospitalized in Portugal, Pereira died on 22 September 2011. Rabil Airport on the Cape Verdean island of Boa Vista was officially renamed as Aristides Pereira International Airport in tribute to him on 19 November 2011. His widow, Carlina Pereira, the former first lady and a leading figure in the country's independence movement, died on 11 December 2011, at the age of 87.

== Cold War ==
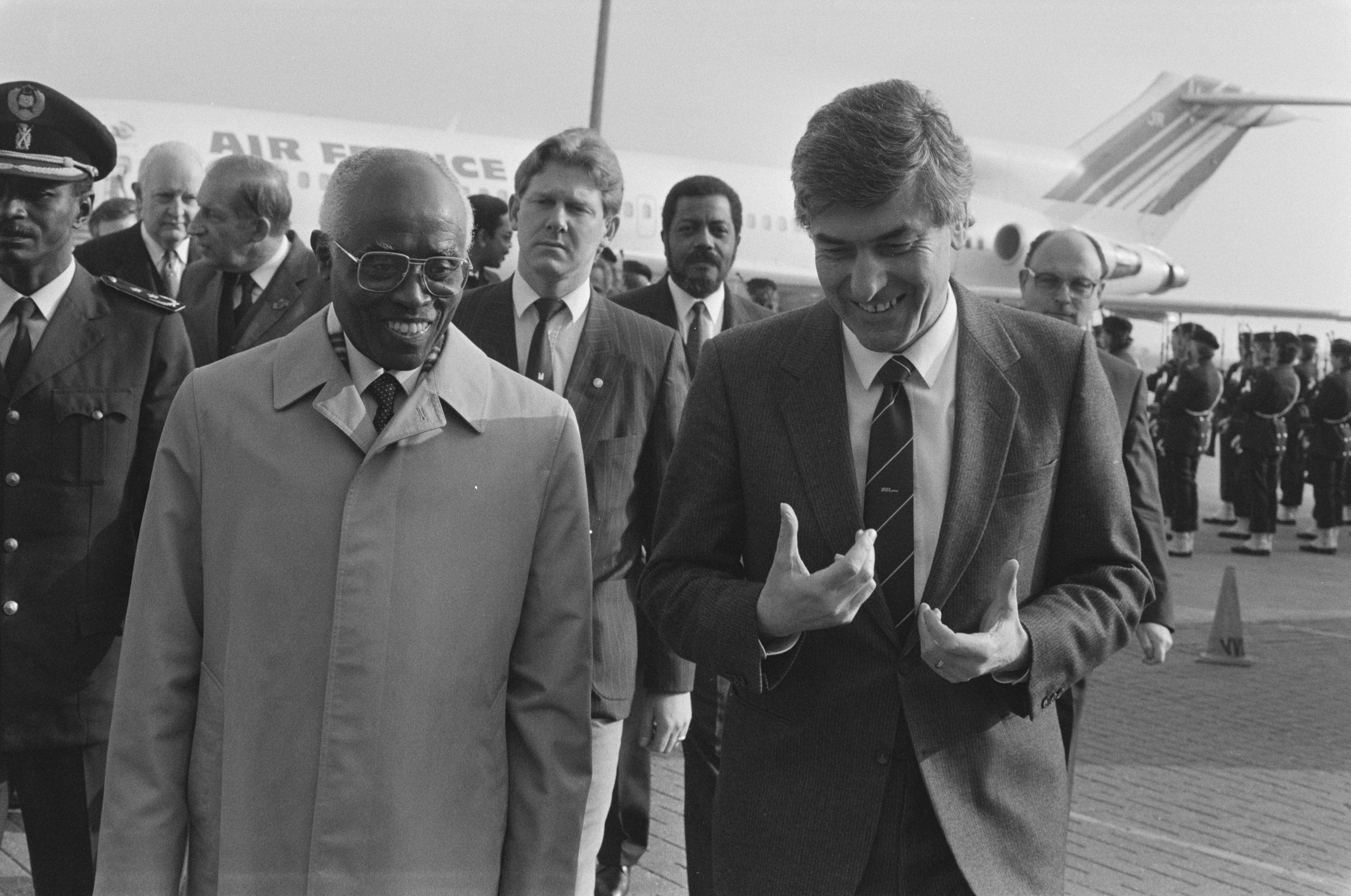
Pereira with Dutch Prime Minister Ruud Lubbers, 1 April 1987

In September 1975, the Soviet Union announced it had established diplomatic relations with Cape Verde, setting up an embassy in both Cape Verde and the Soviet Union.

In 1979, Edward Marks, the US Ambassador to Cape Verde, discussed Pereira’s commitment to his policy of non-alignment between when it came to the ongoing Cold War between the United States and the Soviet Union. Marks mentioned that Pereira had kicked out a number of people from the PAIGC who were deemed to be “young radicals” that he called “Trotskyites” who were believed to be funded by the Soviets.

The Soviet Union was believed by the United States to have a great interest in Cape Verde in 1979. From 1977, the Soviets had been providing military assistance to Cape Verde, through equipment to the army and navy, as well as military advisors. However, Pereira declined further support of equipment like aeroplanes and air force crews, as well as refusing Soviet access to surveillance in Cape Verde’s waters and airspace. It showed that Pereira was a leader willing to work with both sides of the Cold War but was not willing to sell out his government or his country to either side.

In the late 1970s, there was much speculation about Pereira’s health. as well as his potential retirement by the end of the decade. This speculation led to a slight split in his government between Pedro Pries, who was the Prime Minister who had a similar political philosophy. and Silvino da Luz who was the Minister of Defence. a radical with ties to the Soviet Union. It created a rift between those who supported Pereira and Pries and those supporting Luz. However, this came to nothing because Pereira did not retire.

In 1978, the United States, viewed Pereira as a very moderate leader; however, they also acknowledged that the government was still very much in its formative stage, having gained independence only 3 years prior. However, there was an acknowledgement from the United States that there was a group of radicals in the government led by the Minister of Defence, Silvino da Luz, who had ties with the Soviet Union.

In the 1980s, the United States believed that Pereira would begin to align with the United States for military and financial aid due to the constant pressure from Libya and the Soviets, who were trying to influence the country’s military and trying to get access to military bases in Praia.

In 1983, the CIA described Pereira as ‘an experienced, pragmatic and realistic politician’ as well as a ‘respected nationalist’

Despite leading a one-party state, Pereira and the PAICV, were viewed as ‘incorrupt’, which was rare for a one-party state.

Pereira’s government was described as ‘more pragmatic and social democratic than socialist ideological'. It was believed that the idea of Socialism was disliked by the Cape Veridian people as ‘they were a people long accustomed to roam the world, seek employment abroad, freely to use their earnings and invest their savings’. Despite being more left-wing and ‘socialist’ in nature, the Cape Verdean people were accustomed to a more capitalist and free way of life, which was seen in Pereira’s lenient social democratic left-wing rule

== Leadership and legacy ==
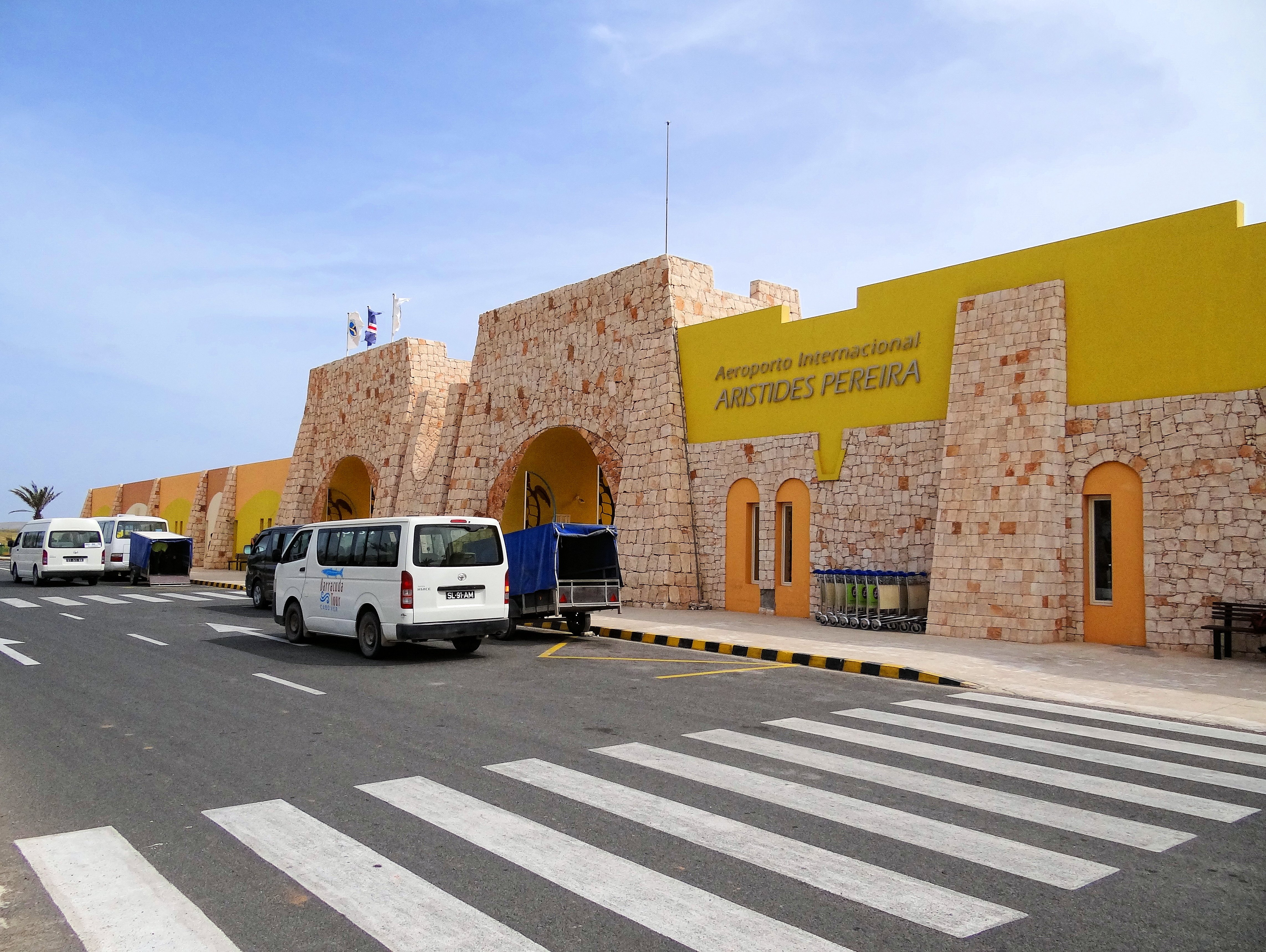
Aristides Pereira International Airport on Boa Vista

Following independence in June 1975, Cape Verde held its first general election under Portuguese rule. The turnout was 85% of the electorate, with 92% voting for the PAIGC, leading to Pereira’s appointment as President of the Republic of Cabo Verde on 5 July 1975.

In 1983, Pereira addressed UNESCO at the 22nd session of the General Conference. The main reason for his address was to talk about Cape Verde as a nation, which was still extremely young; by addressing UNESCO, a global organisation, he aimed to build ties with the rest of the world.

In his speech, Pereira talked about many issues concerning Cape Verde and Africa:

Pereira condemned colonialism and Apartheid, two prominent issues in the 1980s. Pereira credited UNESCO for its work towards ending these issues. Pereira stated ‘its (UNESCO) firmness in defence of the right of peoples to live in freedom and in peace.

Pereira also credited UNESCO with its work toward cultivating education, culture and science worldwide.

Pereira acknowledged the challenges of being a new, small post-colonial state. The country had been independent for under 10 years at this point, and it was suffering from historical issues that remained, as well as drought and poverty.

Pereira also mentioned the North-South divide and the developmental challenges that countries in Africa suffered from, wanting a ‘universal development’ rather than ‘chronic underdevelopment'. He suggested that all countries should develop together rather than creating a North-South divide.

Pereira talked about Cape Verde’s education system as ‘promoting complete, harmonious and life-long training and imparting useful and practical knowledge that will enable the development of the country’, furthermore, the education system set out to create a national consciousness and teach the people about their history and cultural values.

Pereira wanted to make schools places where people develop as human beings, wanting to make the next generation of Cape Veridians better equipped to handle what was to come. With this, Pereira set out to eliminate illiteracy in Cape Verde by 1990, although it was not eliminated under his presidency. Today, Cape Verde is one of the most literate countries in Africa, particularly in the age groups who would have been in education from the 1990s onwards.

Despite leading a one-party state, Pereira’s government allowed for local elections to regional councils, which gave people a chance to democratically elect candidates to represent them. These elections had candidates from both the PAIGC and independent candidates.

Pereira was a Pan-Africanist. Alongside Cabral, they had a vision for an independent Guinea-Bissau and Cape Verde, free from colonial powers, as one united nation. However. due to the 1980 coup in Guinea-Bissau by João Bernardo Vieira, which overthrew Luis Cabral’s government, relations between the two countries broke down, and the idea of unification ended.

On achieving independence, Cape Verde was so impoverished that it was believed that it would only survive 6 months without any support from foreign aid. However, Pereira and his government created cash for work programmes known as FAIMO (Frente de Alta Intensidade de Mão-de-Obra). This scheme created jobs for those living in more rural parts of the islands, focusing on building general infrastructure, that developed more rural areas. This left a positive impact on the islands, providing support to the more impoverished regions. It provided well-paying jobs for those who did not have one, as well as creating infrastructure for areas which previously did not have any.

Pereira built up Cape Verde’s maritime sector, including publicly owned companies such as EMPA (Empresa Pública de Abastecimento), which allowed for better transport of supplies and food between the country’s islands, creating a government-run system of importing and exporting goods, helping to build the nation’s economy.

The population of Cape Verde was estimated to be around 500,000 in 2000, with 53% of the population living in urban areas.

Preceded by Office established	President of Cape Verde; 1975–1991	Succeeded by António Mascarenhas Monteiro
