= Deaths in August 2011 =

The following is a list of notable deaths in August 2011.

Entries for each day are listed alphabetically by surname. A typical entry lists information in the following sequence:

- Name, age, country of citizenship at birth, subsequent country of citizenship (if applicable), reason for notability, cause of death (if known), and reference.

== August 2011 ==
=== 1 ===
- Concha Alós, 85, Spanish writer.
- Stan Barstow, 83, English novelist.
- Joe Caffie, 80, American baseball player (Cleveland Indians, Cleveland Buckeyes).
- Carmela Marie Cristiano, 83, American Roman Catholic nun (Sisters of Charity of Saint Elizabeth), first nun to seek political office in New Jersey.
- Florentina Gómez Miranda, 99, Argentine lawyer and women's rights activist.
- Gamini Goonesena, 80, Sri Lankan cricketer.
- Chieko N. Okazaki, 84, American Mormon women's leader, first non-Caucasian woman to hold a senior position in the LDS church, heart failure.
- Ken Payne, 60, American football player (Green Bay Packers).
- Alex Pitko, 97, American baseball player (Philadelphia Phillies, Washington Senators).
- Zhanna Prokhorenko, 71, Russian film actress (Ballad of a Soldier).

=== 2 ===
- Leslie Esdaile Banks, 51, American author (The Vampire Huntress Legend Series), adrenal cancer.
- Baruj Benacerraf, 90, Venezuelan-born American immunologist, Nobel laureate (1980).
- Ralph Berkowitz, 100, American composer.
- Igor Chepusov, 61, Soviet and American producer, script writer and director.
- Meldric Daluz, 90, Indian Olympic gold medal-winning (1952) field hockey player.
- Al Federoff, 87, American baseball player (Detroit Tigers).
- Asadullo Gulomov, 58, Tajik politician, Deputy Prime Minister (since 2006).
- Andrey Kapitsa, 80, Russian geographer and explorer, discovered and named Lake Vostok.
- Clarence E. Miller, 93, American politician, U.S. Representative from Ohio (1967–1993), pneumonia.
- Attilio Pavesi, 100, Italian Olympic cyclist, oldest living Olympic champion.
- Richard Pearson, 93, Welsh actor (The Yellow Rolls-Royce).
- José Sanchis Grau, 79, Spanish comic book artist.
- James Ford Seale, 76, American murderer, Ku Klux Klan member.
- Markku Yli-Isotalo, 58, Finnish Olympic wrestler

=== 3 ===
- Rudolf Brazda, 98, German concentration camp prisoner, last known survivor of pink triangle homosexual deportation.
- Richard Cates, 85, American lawyer.
- Annette Charles, 63, American actress (Grease), complications from lung cancer.
- Antonio Diaz, 83, Filipino politician, Representative from Zambales (1969–1972, 1992–2001, 2004–2011).
- Jackie Hudson, 76, American nun and peace activist.
- Ingrid Luterkort, 101, Swedish actress.
- Simona Monyová, 44, Czech writer, stabbed.
- Ray Patterson, 89, American basketball executive (Milwaukee Bucks, Houston Rockets).
- Nikolai Arnoldovich Petrov, 68, Russian pianist, People's Artist of the USSR, stroke.
- José Ignacio Rivero, 90, Cuban journalist.
- William Sleator, 66, American science fiction writer (Interstellar Pig).
- Bubba Smith, 66, American football player (Baltimore Colts) and actor (Police Academy, Stroker Ace).
- Mohsen Koochebaghi Tabrizi, 87, Iranian Shi'ite Muslim marja, heart attack.
- Allan Watkins, 89, Welsh cricketer, after short illness.

=== 4 ===
- David B. Barrett, 83, American professor.
- Alan Blackshaw, 78, English mountaineer and civil servant, cancer.
- Michael Bukht, 69, British radio executive, television personality and chef who worked as Michael Barry.
- Mark Duggan, 29, British crime suspect, shot.
- Naoki Matsuda, 34, Japanese footballer (Yokohama F. Marinos, national team), suspected heart attack.
- Conrad Schnitzler, 74, German musician (Tangerine Dream, Kluster, Eruption, Berlin Express), stomach cancer.
- Erika Thijs, 51, Belgian politician, Senator (since 1995), cancer.
- Sherman White, 82, American basketball player (Long Island University).

=== 5 ===
- Jean-Claude Bajeux, 79, Haitian activist and scholar, lung cancer.
- Gerry Davidson, 90, American masters athlete, stroke.
- Erol Erduran, 78, Cypriot educator and writer.
- Dudley E. Faver, 94, American Air Force major general and academic.
- Marion D. Hanks, 89, American Mormon leader.
- Grahame Jarratt, 82, New Zealand rower.
- Hazel Johnson-Brown, 83, American Army nurse and general, Alzheimer's disease.
- Andrzej Lepper, 57, Polish politician, suspected suicide by hanging.
- Elphas Mukonoweshuro, 58, Zimbabwean academic and politician.
- Gary Nixon, 70, American motorcycle racer, complications from a heart attack.
- Francesco Quinn, 48, Italian-born American actor (Platoon, Transformers: Dark of the Moon, The Young and the Restless), heart attack.
- Adi Talmor, 58, Israeli journalist and news presenter, assisted suicide.
- Stan Willemse, 86, British footballer (Chelsea).
- Zyzz, 22, Australian bodybuilder and model, heart attack.

=== 6 ===
- Bernadine Healy, 67, American cardiologist, director of the National Institutes of Health (1991–1993), brain cancer.
- Fred Imus, 69, American songwriter and radio talk show host.
- Kuno Klötzer, 89, German football coach.
- Fe del Mundo, 99, Filipino pediatrician, National Scientist of the Philippines, heart attack.
- Roman Opałka, 79, French-born Polish painter.
- John W. Ryan, 81, American academic administrator, President of Indiana University (1971–1987).
- Jerry Smith, 80, American football player (San Francisco 49ers) and coach (Denver Broncos).
- John Wood, 81, English actor (WarGames, Chocolat, Sabrina), Tony winner (1976).

=== 7 ===
- Eric Anthony Abrahams, 71, Jamaican public servant.
- Joseph Candolfi, 89, Swiss Roman Catholic prelate, Auxiliary Bishop of Basel (1983–1996).
- Hugh Carey, 92, American politician, Governor of New York (1975–1982) and U.S. Representative (1961–1974).
- Rocco Colonna, 77, American politician, Member of the Ohio House of Representatives (1975–1988).
- Charles Coventry, 52, Zimbabwean cricket umpire.
- Cornelius Elanjikal, 92, Indian Roman Catholic prelate, Archbishop of Verapoly (1987–1996).
- Eddie Gibbins, 85, English footballer.
- Marshall Grant, 83, American double bassist (Tennessee Two).
- F. M. Hardacre, 96, American academic and college football coach.
- Mark Hatfield, 89, American politician, Governor of Oregon (1959–1967) and U.S. Senator (1967–1997).
- Harri Holkeri, 74, Finnish politician, Prime Minister (1987–1991), after long illness.
- Paul Meier, 87, American mathematician (Kaplan–Meier estimator), complications from a stroke.
- George Naghi, 59, Romanian businessman, founder of Aldis SRL, boating accident.
- Tom Radney, 79, American politician, member of the Alabama Senate (1967–1971), after long illness.
- Jiří Traxler, 99, Czech-born Canadian jazz pianist.
- Nancy Wake, 98, New Zealand-born Australian French Resistance leader, chest infection.
- Charles Wyly, 77, American businessman and philanthropist, co-founder of Michaels Stores, automobile accident.
- Joe Yamanaka, 64, Japanese rock singer, lung cancer.

=== 8 ===
- Neal Abberley, 67, English cricketer, heart and lung condition.
- Ray Anderson, 77, American entrepreneur, cancer.
- Mike Barrett, 67, American Olympic and professional basketball player (Virginia Squires, San Diego Conquistadors).
- Ruth Brinker, 89, American AIDS and nutrition activist, founder of Project Open Hand, vascular dementia.
- Royal Copeland, 86, Canadian football player (Toronto Argonauts), Alzheimer's disease.
- Cem Erman, 64, Turkish actor and composer.
- Fred Ingaldson, 78, Canadian Olympic basketball player.
- Kurt Johansson, 97, Swedish Olympic sport shooter.
- Anastasios Peponis, 87, Greek politician and author, heart problems.
- Federico Richter Fernandez-Prada, 89, Peruvian Roman Catholic prelate, Archbishop of Ayacucho/Huamanga (1979–1991).
- Hind Rostom, 81, Egyptian actress, heart attack.
- Jiřina Švorcová, 83, Czech actress and pro-Communist activist.
- Chandrashekhar Vijay, 77, Indian Jain Monk.
- Harry H. Wellington, 84, American lawyer, Dean of Yale Law School (1975–1985) and New York Law School (1992–2000), brain tumor.
- Guillermo Zarur, 79, Mexican actor, complications of kidney and heart disease.

=== 9 ===
- Wendy Babcock, 32, Canadian advocate for the rights of prostitutes, suspected suicide.
- Roberto Busa, 97, Italian Jesuit priest, pioneer in Digital Humanities.
- Adolphe-Maria Gustave Hardy, 91, French Roman Catholic prelate, Bishop of Beauvais (1985–1995).
- Yoshihiro Hamaguchi, 85, Japanese Olympic swimmer, heart failure.
- Jimmy Harris, 76, American football player (University of Oklahoma, Dallas Cowboys, Philadelphia Eagles), natural causes.
- Kolapo Ishola, 77, Nigerian politician, Governor of Oyo State (1991–1993).
- Eleanor Josaitis, 79, American activist, co-founder of Focus: HOPE, peritoneal cancer.
- Julian Kenny, 81, Trinidadian zoologist, environmentalist and politician, Senator (1995–2001).
- Mimi Lee, 91, American chemist, First Lady of Maryland (1977–1979), heart failure.
- Werner W. Wallroth, 81, German film director.

=== 10 ===
- P. C. Alexander, 90, Indian politician, Governor of Tamil Nadu (1988–1990), Maharashtra (1993–2002) and Goa (1996–1998).
- Moraíto Chico II, 54, Spanish musician, cancer.
- Arnaud Desjardins, 86, French philosopher.
- Norton Fredrick, 73, Sri Lankan cricketer, illness.
- Billy Grammer, 85, American country singer.
- Selwyn Griffith, 83, Welsh poet.
- Oldřich Machač, 65, Czech Olympic silver (1968, 1976) and bronze (1972) medal-winning ice hockey player, heart failure.
- Babak Masoumi, 39, Iranian futsal player and coach, blood cancer.
- Lilia Michel, 85, Mexican actress.
- Mark Sinyangwe, 31, Zambian footballer.

=== 11 ===
- Agustín Romualdo Álvarez Rodríguez, 88, Spanish-born Venezuelan Roman Catholic prelate, Vicar Apostolic of Machiques (1986–1995).
- V. R. Athavale, 92, Indian singer.
- Robert Breer, 84, American experimental filmmaker.
- Don Chandler, 76, American football player (New York Giants, Green Bay Packers).
- George Devol, 99, American inventor, creator of Unimate, the first industrial robot.
- Ignacio Flores, 58, Mexican football player (Cruz Azul, national team), shot.
- Mateo Flores, 89, Guatemalan Olympic athlete.
- Noach Flug, 86, Polish-born Israeli economist, advocate for rights of Holocaust survivors.
- Richard Floyd, 80, American politician and lawmaker.
- Clair George, 81, American CIA officer (Iran–Contra affair), cardiac arrest.
- David Holbrook, 88, English writer and academic.
- Jani Lane, 47, American musician (Warrant), acute alcohol poisoning.
- Scott LeDoux, 62, American boxer, amyotrophic lateral sclerosis.
- Karen Overington, 59, Australian politician, Victorian MLA for Ballarat West (1999–2010).
- Bob Shamansky, 84, American politician, U.S. Representative from Ohio (1981–1983).
- Johann Traxler, 52, Austrian Olympic cyclist.
- Joe Trimble, 80, American baseball player (Boston Red Sox, Pittsburgh Pirates).
- Paul Wilkinson, 74, British academic, expert on the study of terrorism (University of St Andrews).
- Bob Will, 80, American baseball player (Chicago Cubs).

=== 12 ===
- Patricia Acioli, 47, Brazilian judge and feminist, shot.
- Austin-Emile Burke, 89, Canadian Roman Catholic prelate, Archbishop of Halifax (1991–1998).
- Ernie Johnson, 87, American baseball player (Boston Braves/Milwaukee Braves, Baltimore Orioles) and broadcaster (Atlanta Braves).
- Karl Kittsteiner, 91, German cyclist and National Champion (1946).
- Charles P. Murray Jr., 89, American Army colonel, Medal of Honor recipient, heart failure.
- Robert Robinson, 83, English radio and television presenter.
- Francisco Solano López, 83, Argentine comics artist (El Eternauta), complications from a stroke.
- Pierpaolo Spangaro, 69, Italian Olympic swimmer.

=== 13 ===
- Álvaro Lara, 26, Chilean footballer, traffic collision.
- Chris Lawrence, 78, British racing driver and engineer, cancer.
- Ctirad Mašín, 81, Czech resistance fighter.
- Tareque Masud, 54, Bangladeshi independent film director, traffic collision.
- Mishuk Munier, 52, Bangladeshi journalist, photography director, media specialist and cinematographer, traffic collision.
- Jesús del Pozo, 65, Spanish fashion designer, pulmonary emphysema.
- Topi Sorsakoski, 58, Finnish singer, lung cancer.
- Ellen Winther, 78, Danish opera singer and actress.

=== 14 ===
- Fritz Bach, 77, Austrian-born American transplant physician and immunologist.
- Jonathan Bacon, 30, American gangster, shot.
- Albert Brown, 105, American World War II veteran, oldest survivor of Bataan Death March.
- Kase2 (Jeff Brown), 52, graffiti writer and contributor to the hip-hop movement.
- Yekaterina Golubeva, 44, Russian actress.
- Shammi Kapoor, 79, Indian film actor and director, renal failure.
- Fritz Korbach, 66, German football player and manager, laryngeal cancer.
- Paul Reeves, 78, New Zealand Anglican archbishop, Primate (1980–1985), Governor-General (1985–1990), cancer.
- Friedrich Schoenfelder, 94, German actor.
- Shawn Tompkins, 37, Canadian kickboxer and mixed martial artist, suspected heart attack.

=== 15 ===
- Nenad Bijedić, 51, Bosnian football manager, cancer.
- Colin Harvey, 50, British science fiction writer and editor, stroke.
- Michael Legat, 88, British author and publisher.
- Peter Mair, 60, Irish political scientist.
- Solomon Mujuru, 62, Zimbabwean military officer and politician, injuries from a fire.
- Wim Peeters, 85, South African Olympic shooter.
- Hugo Perié, 67, Argentine politician, MP (since 2003), Montoneros militant, lung disease.
- Sif Ruud, 95, Swedish actress.
- Rick Rypien, 27, Canadian ice hockey player (Vancouver Canucks), suicide.
- Tōru Shōriki, 92, Japanese baseball team owner (Tokyo Giants), sepsis.
- Betty Thatcher, 67, British lyricist (Renaissance), cancer.

=== 16 ===
- Vladimir Antakov, 54, Soviet Olympic hockey player.
- Andrej Bajuk, 67, Slovenian politician and economist, Prime Minister (2000), stroke.
- Mihri Belli, 96, Turkish politician and writer, respiratory failure.
- Creed Black, 86, American newspaper publisher (Lexington Herald-Leader).
- Huw Ceredig, 69, Welsh actor.
- Fernando Coronil, 66, Venezuelan anthropologist and historian, lung cancer.
- Albert Facchiano, 101, American mobster.
- Akiko Futaba, 96, Japanese ryūkōka singer.
- Ahmet Kıbıl, 58, Turkish Olympic skier.
- Bruno Monti, 81, Italian Olympic cyclist.
- Frank Munro, 63, Scottish footballer (Wolverhampton Wanderers F.C.), heart attack.
- Pete Pihos, 87, American Hall of Fame football player (Philadelphia Eagles), Alzheimer's disease.
- Leo Rodríguez, 82, Mexican baseball player.
- Ramesh Saxena, 66, Indian cricketer, brain haemorrhage.
- Bernard William Schmitt, 82, American Roman Catholic prelate, Bishop of Wheeling-Charleston (1989–2004).
- Aud Talle, 65, Norwegian social anthropologist.

=== 17 ===
- Augustus Aikhomu, 72, Nigerian admiral and politician, Vice President (1986–1993).
- Hrach Bartikyan, 84, Armenian academician.
- Vasyl Dzharty, 53, Ukrainian politician, Prime Minister of Crimea (since 2010), cancer.
- Gualtiero Jacopetti, 91, Italian documentary film director.
- Michel Mohrt, 97, French writer, member of the Académie française (since 1985).
- Pierre Quinon, 49, French pole vaulter and Olympic champion (1984), suicide by self-defenestration.
- Bill Robinson, 72, New Zealand scientist.

=== 18 ===
- John Bean, 48, Australian cinematographer, helicopter crash.
- Samir Chanda, 53, Indian art film director, cardiac arrest.
- Peter George Davis, 87, English Royal Marine officer,
- Simon De Jong, 69, Canadian politician, MP for Regina East (1979–1988) and Regina—Qu'Appelle (1988–1997), leukemia.
- Bill Gray, 88, American football player (Washington Redskins).
- Johnson, 58, Indian film music composer, cardiac arrest.
- Paul Lockyer, 61, Australian journalist, helicopter crash.
- Herb Pfuhl, 83, American politician, longest-serving mayor of Johnstown, Pennsylvania (1971–1977, 1982–1993).
- Maurice M. Rapport, 91, American neuroscience biochemist.
- Scotty Robertson, 81, American basketball coach (New Orleans Jazz, Chicago Bulls, Detroit Pistons), cancer.
- Jerome Shestack, 88, American human rights activist and attorney, President of American Bar Association (1997–1998).
- Jean Tabary, 81, French comic strip artist.
- Norm Willey, 83, American football player (Philadelphia Eagles).

=== 19 ===
- John Abley, 81, Australian football player, cardiac arrest.
- Hendrina Afrikaner, 58–59, Namibian politician, car accident.
- Merv Brooks, 92, Australian footballer.
- Gil Courtemanche, 68, Canadian journalist and novelist (Un dimanche à la piscine à Kigali), cancer.
- Gun Hägglund, 79, Swedish television personality, Sweden's first female television news presenter, after short illness.
- Kerima Polotan Tuvera, 85, Filipino author and journalist.
- Brian Pope, 100, English rugby union player.
- Raúl Ruiz, 70, Chilean film director (Three Lives and Only One Death, Time Regained), pulmonary infection.
- Jimmy Sangster, 83, British director and screenwriter (Hammer Films).
- Vilem Sokol, 96, American conductor and music professor, cancer.
- Vladimir Torban, 78, Soviet basketballer, 1956 Olympic silver medalist, two-times European champion.
- Yevhen Yevseyev, 24, Ukrainian footballer, car accident.

=== 20 ===
- George C. Axtell, 90, American military officer, United States Marine Corps lieutenant-general.
- Reza Badiyi, 81, Iranian-born American television director (Mission: Impossible, Cagney & Lacey, The Incredible Hulk).
- Ross Barbour, 82, American singer, last founding member of The Four Freshmen, lung cancer.
- Marty Bergmann, 55, Canadian scientist and public servant, plane crash.
- Fred Fay, 66, American leader in the disability rights movement.
- Charles Gubser, 95, American politician, U.S. Representative from California (1953–1974).
- Rafael Halperin, 87, Israeli businessman and professional wrestler.
- Patricia Hardy, 79, American actress, colon cancer.
- Chal Port, 80, American baseball coach (The Citadel).
- Jethu Singh Rajpurohit, 90, Indian politician.
- Angelo Maria Rivato, 86, Brazilian Roman Catholic prelate, Bishop of Ponta de Pedras (1967–2002).
- Ram Sharan Sharma, 91, Indian historian.
- Vernon Stratton, 83, British Olympic sailor.

=== 21 ===
- Dharani Dhar Awasthi, 88, Indian botanist, taxonomist, and lichenologist.
- Dame Christine Cole Catley, 88, New Zealand journalist, publisher and author, lung cancer.
- Sir Donald Farquharson, 83, British jurist.
- Patrick Guillemin, 60, French actor and voice actor, heart attack.
- Brian Harrison, 89, Australian-born British politician and businessman, MP for Maldon (1955–1974).
- Budd Hopkins, 80, American artist and UFO researcher, liver cancer.
- John R. Hubbard, 92, American diplomat, President of University of Southern California (1970–1980), United States Ambassador to India (1988–1989).
- John J. Kelley, 80, American Olympic long-distance runner, winner of the 1957 Boston Marathon.
- Irène Pittelioen, 84, French Olympic gymnast.
- Ezra Sued, 88, Argentine footballer (Racing Club de Avellaneda), infection.
- Muga Takewaki, 67, Japanese actor, cerebrovascular disease.
- Edith Tiempo, 92, Filipino author, National Artist of the Philippines, heart attack.

=== 22 ===
- Atiyah Abd al-Rahman, 40, Libyan-born Afghan Al-Qaeda leader.
- Abdul Aziz Abdul Ghani, 72, Yemeni politician, Prime Minister (1994–1997).
- Ray Abruzzese, 73, American football player (Buffalo Bills, New York Jets).
- Nickolas Ashford, 70, American R&B singer (Ashford & Simpson) and songwriter ("Ain't No Mountain High Enough"), throat cancer.
- John Howard Davies, 72, English television producer and director (Fawlty Towers, The Good Life), former child actor (Oliver Twist), cancer.
- Kamal el-Shennawi, 89, Egyptian actor.
- Joan Gerber, 76, American voice actress (DuckTales).
- Jesper Klein, 66, Danish actor, liver cancer.
- Jack Layton, 61, Canadian politician, Leader of the Official Opposition (2011) and New Democratic Party (2003–2011), cancer.
- Jerry Leiber, 78, American songwriter ("Stand By Me", "Hound Dog", "Jailhouse Rock"), cardiopulmonary failure.
- Loriot, 87, German cartoonist and actor.
- Samuel Menashe, 85, American poet, natural causes.
- Žarko Nikolić, 74, Serbian footballer.
- Casey Ribicoff, 88, American socialite and philanthropist, lung cancer.
- Michael Showers, 45, American actor (Treme, The Vampire Diaries, The Tree of Life), drowned.
- Thomas Syme, 83, British Olympic ice hockey player.

=== 23 ===
- Akhtaruzzaman, 65, Bangladeshi film director.
- J.C. Daniel, 84, Indian naturalist, lung cancer.
- Paul Francis Duffy, 79, American-born Zambian Roman Catholic prelate, Bishop of Mongu (1997–2011).
- Clare Hodges, 54, British campaigner for the medical use of cannabis, multiple sclerosis.
- Sybil Jason, 83, American child actress.
- David Lunn-Rockliffe, 86, British businessman co-founder of the River and Rowing Museum, heart failure.
- Jim Peckham, 81, American Olympic wrestler.
- Frank Potenza, 77, American police officer and actor (Jimmy Kimmel Live!), cancer.
- Hasballah M. Saad, 63, Indonesian politician, Human Rights Minister (1999–2000).
- Peter Terpeluk Jr., 63, American diplomat, Ambassador to Luxembourg (2002–2005), heart attack.
- June Wayne, 93, American artist and print maker.
- Willie Williams, 86, American Negro league baseball player.

=== 24 ===
- Frank DiLeo, 63, American music industry executive and actor (Goodfellas, Wayne's World), heart complications.
- Esther Gordy Edwards, 91, American Motown executive, creator of Hitsville U.S.A. museum.
- Seyhan Erözçelik, 49, Turkish poet.
- Mike Flanagan, 59, American baseball player (Baltimore Orioles, Toronto Blue Jays), suicide by gunshot.
- Frederick A. Fox, 80, American composer and music educator.
- Jenő Gerbovits, 86, Hungarian politician, minister without portfolio (1990–1991), tractor accident.
- Paul Harney, 82, American golfer.
- Jack Hayes, 92, American composer and orchestrator (The Color Purple, The Unsinkable Molly Brown), natural causes.
- Clemente Isnard, 94, Brazilian Roman Catholic prelate, Bishop of Nova Friburgo (1960–1992).
- George Knight, 90, English footballer (Burnley).
- Joyce McDougall, 91, New Zealand-French psychoanalyst.
- Graeme Moody, 60, New Zealand sports broadcaster, drowned.
- Yacoub Romanos, 76, Lebanese Olympic wrestler.
- Alfons Van Brandt, 84, Belgian footballer.

=== 25 ===
- Bandi Rajan Babu, 73, Indian photographer.
- A. A. Birch Jr., 78, American lawyer and judge, Chief Justice of the Tennessee Supreme Court.
- Donna Christanello, 69, American professional wrestler, heart attack.
- Jyles Coggins, 90, American politician, Mayor of Raleigh, North Carolina (1975–1977).
- Elliott Johnston, 93, Australian jurist, Judge of the Supreme Court of South Australia (1983–1988).
- Lazar Mojsov, 90, Macedonian politician, 10th. President of the Presidency of Yugoslavia (1987–1988).
- Eugene Nida, 96, American linguist and bible translator.
- Anne Sharp, 94, Scottish coloratura soprano.
- Ruth Thomas, 84, British writer.

=== 26 ===
- Aloysius Ambrozic, 81, Slovenian-born Canadian Roman Catholic cardinal, Archbishop of Toronto (1990–2006).
- George Band, 82, British mountaineer.
- C. K. Barrett, 94, British theologian.
- Josephine Figlo, 88, American baseball player (AAGPBL).
- Patrick C. Fischer, 75, American computer scientist and Unabomber target.
- Susan Fromberg Schaeffer, 71, American novelist and educator, complications of a stroke.
- John McAleese, 61, British SAS soldier involved in the Iranian Embassy Siege.
- Elvis Reifer, 50, Barbadian cricketer.
- Manuel Saavedra, 70, Chilean footballer
- Donn A. Starry, 86, American army officer, Commanding General, TRADOC (1977–1981).
- B. Jeff Stone, 75, American rockabilly singer-songwriter.
- Nadine Winter, 87, American politician, member of the Council of the District of Columbia (1975–1991).

=== 27 ===
- Heribert Barrera, 94, Spanish politician, President of the Parliament of Catalonia (1980–1984).
- Eve Brent, 82, American actress (The Green Mile, Garfield, Adam-12).
- Frank Fanovich, 88, American baseball player (Cincinnati Reds, Philadelphia Athletics).
- Lykourgos Kallergis, 97, Greek actor, director and politician.
- Stetson Kennedy, 94, American folklorist and civil rights activist.
- Kim Tai-chung, 54, Korean actor and martial artist, internal stomach bleeding.
- Nico Minardos, 81, Greek actor (Istanbul, Twelve Hours to Kill, The Twilight Zone), natural causes.
- John Parke, 74, Northern Irish footballer (Linfield, Hibernian, Sunderland, Northern Ireland), Alzheimer's disease.
- Tapio Pöyhönen, 83, Finnish Olympic basketball player
- Iya Savvina, 75, Russian actress, People's Artist of the USSR.
- N. F. Simpson, 92, British dramatist.
- Keith Tantlinger, 92, American mechanical engineer and inventor.
- Pat Villani, 57, American computer programmer (FreeDOS)

=== 28 ===
- Theo Blankenaauw, 87, Dutch track cyclist.
- Billy Drake, 93, British fighter pilot.
- Bernie Gallacher, 44, British footballer (Aston Villa).
- Bruno Gamberini, 61, Brazilian Roman Catholic prelate, Archbishop of Campinas (since 2004).
- Len Ganley, 68, Northern Irish snooker referee.
- George Green, 59, American songwriter ("Hurts So Good", "Crumblin' Down"), lung cancer.
- Leonard Harris, 81, American actor, arts and theater critic (WCBS-TV), complications of pneumonia.
- Leonidas Kyrkos, 87, Greek politician, after short illness.
- Dmitri Royster, 87, American hierarch (Orthodox Church in America), Archbishop of the Diocese of the South (1978–2009).
- Tony Sale, 80, British computer scientist.
- Necip Torumtay, 84–85, Turkish general, Chief of the General Staff (1987–1990).

=== 29 ===
- Ebenezer Adam, 91–92, Ghanaian teacher and politician.
- Pauline Morrow Austin, 94, American physicist and meteorologist.
- Jim Baechtold, 83, American basketball player.
- John Bancroft, 82, British architect.
- David "Honeyboy" Edwards, 96, American blues guitarist and singer, heart failure.
- Khamis Gaddafi, 28, Libyan seventh son of Muammar Gaddafi, commander of the Khamis Brigade, airstrike.
- R. B. McDowell, 97, Irish historian.
- Mark Ovendale, 37, English footballer (Luton Town, Bournemouth), cancer.
- David P. Reynolds, 96, American businessman and Thoroughbred racehorse breeder.
- George Sutor, 67, American basketball player.
- Junpei Takiguchi, 80, Japanese voice actor and narrator (Dragon Ball, Yatterman, Mazinger Z), stomach cancer.
- Ayala Zacks-Abramov, 99, Israeli art patron.

=== 30 ===
- Alla Bayanova, 97, Russian singer, People's Artist of Russia, cancer.
- Faye Blackstone, 96, American rodeo star, cancer.
- Ronald N. Hartman, 76, American professor of astronomy, planetarium director (Mt. San Antonio College).
- Revo Jõgisalu, 35, Estonian rapper, melanoma.
- Peggy Lloyd, 98, American stage actress.
- Wambui Otieno, 75, Kenyan politician.
- João Carlos Batista Pinheiro, 79, Brazilian footballer, prostate cancer.
- Cactus Pryor, 88, American broadcaster, Alzheimer's disease.

=== 31 ===
- Paul Abisheganaden, 97, Singaporean music conductor and Cultural Medallion recipient.
- Wade Belak, 35, Canadian ice hockey player (Toronto Maple Leafs, Nashville Predators), suicide.
- Cal Christensen, 84, American basketball player (Milwaukee Hawks, Rochester Royals), heart failure.
- Denis Collins, 58, Australian football player, heart attack.
- Abderrahmane Mahjoub, 82, Moroccan-born French footballer.
- Robert Muir, 91, Canadian politician, MP and Senator.
- Dave Petrie, 64, Scottish politician, Member of the Scottish Parliament for Highlands and Islands (2006–2007).
- Valery Rozhdestvensky, 72, Soviet cosmonaut.
- Betty Skelton, 85, American aerobatics pilot and Women Airforce Service Pilots veteran.
- Jack Stephens, 78, American basketball player (St. Louis Hawks).
- Radoslav Stojanović, 81, Serbian politician and law expert (University of Belgrade), co-founder of the Democratic Party.
- Peter Twiss, 90, British test pilot.
- Frank Warner, 85, American sound editor (Close Encounters of the Third Kind, Raging Bull, Taxi Driver).
- Rosel Zech, 69, German actress (Veronika Voss, Aimée & Jaguar), cancer.
