= List of Catholic dioceses in Cape Verde =

The Roman Catholic Church in Cape Verde is composed only of a Latin hierarchy, comprising two exempt dioceses, which depend directly on the Holy See, not forming part of any Ecclesiastical province. As this warrants no national Episcopal Conference, the episcopate of (ex-Portuguese) Cape Verde sits in the West African (francophone & lusophone) transnational Conférence des Evêques du Sénégal, de la Mauritanie, du Cap-Vert et de Guinée-Bissau with Senegal, Mauretania and Guinea-Bissau (all ex-French).

There are no Eastern Catholic, pre-diocesan or other non-provincial jurisdictions.

There are no titular sees. All defunct jurisdictions have current successor sees.

There formally is an Apostolic Nunciature (papal diplomatic representation at embassy-level) to Cape Verde, but it is vested in the Apostolic Nunciature to Senegal, in its capital Dakar.

== Current Latin dioceses ==
=== Immediately subject to the Holy See ===
- Diocese of Mindelo
- Diocese of Santiago de Cabo Verde

== See also ==
- List of Catholic dioceses (structured view)
- Catholic Church in Cape Verde

== Sources and external links ==
- GCatholic.org - data for all sections.
- Catholic-Hierarchy entry.
