= Paulino do Livramento Évora =

Cape Verdean clergyman (1931–2019)

His Excellency, The Most Reverend Paulino do Livramento Évora
- Bishop of Santiago de Cabo Verde
- Diocese: Roman Catholic Diocese of Santiago de Cabo Verde
- In office: 21 April 1975 – 22 July 2009
- Predecessor: José Filípe do Carmo Colaço
- Successor: Arlindo Gomes Furtado

Personal details
- Born: 22 June 1931; Praia, Santiago, Cape Verde
- Died: 16 June 2019 (aged 87)

Paulino do Livramento Évora (22 June 1931 – 16 June 2019) was a Cape Verdean Catholic prelate who served as the first native-born Bishop of Cape Verde from 1975 to 2009.

== Early life ==
He was born in Praia, Cape Verde.

== Career ==
He joined the congregation of the Holy Fathers and on December 16, 1962, was ordained by Pope Paul VI. On April 21, 1975, he became the 33rd bishop of Santiago de Cabo Verde.

The bishop of Malanje, Eduardo André Muaca on June 1 bestowed the episcopal ordination, with Francisco Esteves Dias, OSB, Bishop of Luso (now Lwena) and Zacarias Kamwenho, Archbishop of Luanda.

On December 9, 2003, his diocese's areas were reduced to the Sotavento Islands as the Barlavento Islands became part of the Roman Catholic Diocese of Mindelo due to population growth.

One of the last projects of building churches in his diocese was Nossa Senhora de Fátima (Our Lady of Fatima) church in Milho Branco. He laid the foundation stone on May 10, 2009. It was opened three years later after he retired as bishop.

He remained bishop until July 22, 2009. He was succeeded by Arlindo Gomes Furtado. He died on 16 June 2019.

Catholic Church titles
Preceded by José Filipe do Carmo Colaço	Bishop of Santiago de Cape Verde; 1975–2009	Succeeded by Arlindo Gomes Furtado
