= Ildo Augusto Dos Santos Lopes Fortes =

The Most Reverend Ildo Augusto dos Santos Lopes Fortes
- Bishop of Mindelo
- Church: Roman Catholic Church
- Diocese: Mindelo
- See: Mindelo
- Appointed: 25 January 2011
- Installed: 10 April 2011
- Predecessor: Arlindo Gomes Furtado

Orders
- Ordination: 29 November 1992
- Consecration: 3 April 2011 by José da Cruz Policarpo

Personal details
- Born: Ildo Augusto dos Santos Lopes Fortes; 13 December 1964 (age 60); Sal, Cape Verde
- Motto: Nas tuas mãos
- Coat of arms

Ildo Augusto dos Santos Lopes Fortes (born 13 December 1964) is a Cape Verdean Catholic prelate who has served as Bishop of Mindelo since 2011.

He also serves as president of Caritas Cape Verde.

== Biography ==
He was born in the island of Sal in Cape Verde, at the time under Portuguese rule.

dos Santos Lopes Fortes received his priestly ordination on 29 November 1992. On 25 January 2011, he was nominated as bishop of Mindelo. The diocese covering the Barlavento Islands was vacant from August 2009 as the last bishop Arlindo Gomes Furtado became bishop of Santiago de Cabo Verde later that time. On 10 April, he became the second and present bishop of Mindelo.

The Patriarch of Lisbon, José da Cruz Cardinal Policarpo conferred upon him episcopal consecration on April 3 that year. The principal co-consecrators included Arlindo Gomes Furtado, bishop of Santiago de Cabo Verde and Manuel José Macário do Nascimento Clemente, Bishop of Porto.

Catholic Church titles
Preceded by Arlindo Gomes Furtado	Bishop of Mindelo; 2011-present	Succeeded by Incumbent
