= Teodoro Mendes Tavares =

His Excellency, The Most Reverend Teodoro Mendes Tavares CSSp
- Bishop of Ponta de Pedras
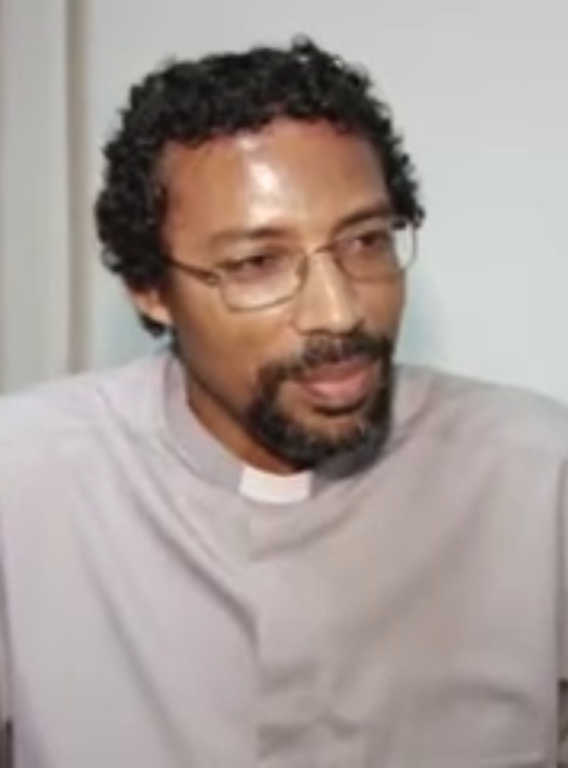
- Diocese: Roman Catholic Diocese of Ponta de Pedras
- In office: since September 23, 2015
- Predecessor: Alessio Saccardo

Personal details
- Born: 7 January 1964 (age 62) São Miguel Arcanjo parish, Santiago, Cape Verde

Teodoro Mendes Tavares CSSp (born 7 January 1964) is a Cape Verdean Catholic prelate who has served as Bishop of Ponta de Pedras in Brazil since 2015. He is the first and only Cape Verdean-born Catholic bishop in Brazil.

== Biography ==
He was born in the parish of São Miguel, once in the municipality of Tarrafal, now in the municipality of São Miguel.

Teodoro Tavares studied philosophy at the High Institute of Theology (Instituto Superior de Teologia) in Braga, a campus of the Faculty of Theology of the Catholic University of Portugal from 1986 to 1987. He later studied theology at the Faculty of Theology at the Catholic University of Portugal from 1988 to 1993.

In 1995, he obtained the title as master at Trinity College, Dublin, where he presented a dissertation "The Churches and the European Immigration Policy in the Light of the Schengen and Dublin Agreement".

He was ordained priest on June 11, 1993 and went on a mission to Brazil in 1994 to the Prelate of Tefé, in Amazonas state, first he was vicar-general, from 2001 until 2011, he was parish priest in Alvarães, Carauari and Uarini.

He was ordained bishop on 8 May 2011 on his native island of Santiago by Alberto Taveira Corrêa.

On September 23, 2015, he became bishop of the diocese of Ponta de Pedras in Pará.

On February 16, 2026, he was appointed bishop of Santiago de Cabo Verde, succeeding Cardinal Arlindo Gomes Furtado.

Catholic Church titles
Preceded by Alessio Saccardo	Bishop of Ponta de Pedras since 2015	Succeeded by Incumbent
