= Arlindo Gomes Furtado =

Cape Verdean Catholic cardinal (born 1949)

His Eminence Arlindo Gomes Furtado
- Cardinal; Bishop emeritus of Santiago de Cabo Verde
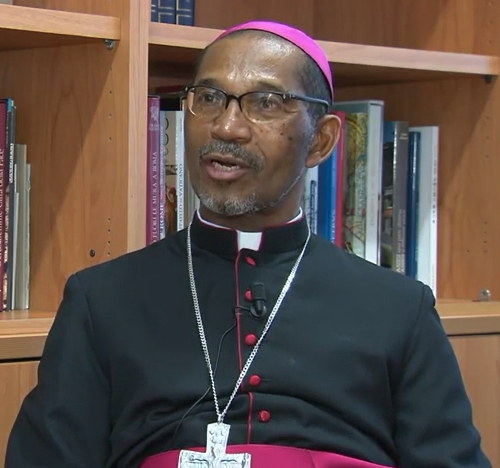
- Furtado in 2015
- Church: Catholic Church
- Diocese: Santiago de Cabo Verde
- See: Santiago de Cabo Verde
- Appointed: 22 July 2009
- Installed: 15 August 2009
- Term ended: 16 February 2026
- Predecessor: Paulino do Livramento Évora C.S.Sp
- Successor: Teodoro Mendes Tavares, C.S.Sp
- Other post: Cardinal-Priest of San Timoteo (2015-)
- Previous post: Bishop of Mindelo (2003–09)

Orders
- Ordination: 18 July 1976
- Consecration: 22 February 2004 by Paulino do Livramento Évora
- Created cardinal: 14 February 2015 by Pope Francis
- Rank: Cardinal-Priest

Personal details
- Born: Arlindo Gomes Furtado; 15 November 1949 (age 77) Santa Catarina, Cape Verde
- Motto: Jesus, O Bom Pastor (Jesus, the Good Shepherd)
- Coat of arms: Arlindo Gomes Furtado's coat of arms

Styles of Arlindo Gomes Furtado
- Reference style: His Eminence
- Spoken style: Your Eminence
- Informal style: Cardinal
- See: Santiago de Cabo Verde

Ordination history of Arlindo Gomes Furtado
History
Diaconal ordination
- Date: 9 May 1976
Priestly ordination
- Date: 18 July 1976
Episcopal consecration
- Principal consecrator: Paulino do Livramento Évora, C.S.Sp
- Co-consecrators: Albino Mamede Cleto; José Cámnate na Bissign
- Date: 22 February 2004
Cardinalate
- Elevated by: Pope Francis
- Date: 14 February 2015

Arlindo Gomes Furtado (born 15 November 1949) is a Cape Verdean Catholic prelate who has served as Bishop of Santiago de Cabo Verde from 2009 to 2026. He was the first Bishop of Mindelo from 2004 to 2009.

He studied for several years in Coimbra, Portugal, while preparing for his ordination, and several more as a professor there after becoming a priest. Pope Francis made him a cardinal in 2015, the first from Cape Verde.

== Early life and education ==
Arlindo Gomes Furtado was born on 15 November 1949 in Figueira das Naus, a village of the municipality of Santa Catarina, to Ernesto Robaldo Gomes and Maria Furtado; he was baptized in August 1951. He studied at a primary school in nearby Achada Lem and by October 1962 completed his secondary education at the Seminary of São José in Praia. From 1971 to 1976, Furtado studied theology in Coimbra, Portugal.

He returned to Cape Verde and was ordained a deacon on 9 May 1976 by Paulino do Livramento Évora, Bishop of Santiago. He worked at the Nossa Senhora da Graça until Bishop Evora ordained him a priest on 18 July 1976 and made him parish vicar there. From 1978 to 1986 he was rector of the Seminary of São José. From 1986 to 1990 he studied in Rome, earning a licentiate in biblical science at the Pontifical Biblical Institute.

== Early priesthood ==
Returning to Cape Verde for a year, he worked for a year in the Lém-Cachorro and Achada São Filipe areas and then taught English at Liceu Domingos Ramos. Back in Coimbra from 1991 to 1995, he taught Greek, Hebrew, History and Biblical Geography at the Theological Studies Institute in Coimbra. He worked on translations of books of Proverbs and Ecclesiastes and published some scholarly articles and reviews. He was also a parish administrator during these years. In 1995 he returned to Cape Verde where he led the parish of Nossa Senhora da Graça once more. He became a member of the National Education Council, taught at the Police Training School, and served as vicar general of the Diocese of Santiago.

== Episcopacy ==
On 11 December 2003, Pope John Paul II named him the first bishop of the newly created diocese of Mindelo. He received his episcopal consecration on 22 February 2004 from Bishop Evora.

On 22 July 2009, Pope Benedict XVI named Furtado bishop of the Santiago Diocese, one of the oldest dioceses in Africa, and he was installed there on 15 August.

On 4 January 2015, Pope Francis announced that he would make him a cardinal on 14 February. Furtado became the first Cape Verdean cardinal, At the ceremony, he was assigned the titular church of San Timoteo.

On 13 April 2015 he was named a member of the Congregation for the Evangelization of Peoples and of the Pontifical Council Cor Unum. On 28 October 2016, he was made a member of the Congregation for Divine Worship and the Discipline of the Sacraments.

He participated as a cardinal elector in the 2025 papal conclave that elected Pope Leo XIV.

Pope Leo XIV accepted his resignation due to age on February 16, 2026, and appointed Teodoro Mendes Tavares, C.S.Sp., as his successor on the same date.

== See also ==
- Cardinals created by Pope Francis

Catholic Church titles
Preceded by diocese established	Bishop of Mindelo; 2004–2009	Succeeded by Ildo Augusto Dos Santos Lopes Fortes
Preceded by Paulino do Livramento Évora	Bishop of Santiago de Cabo Verde; 2009 – present	Incumbent
Preceded by titular church established	Cardinal Priest of Church of Saint Timothy; 2015–present	Incumbent
