= List of Fulbright Scholars from the University of Belgrade Faculty of Law =

This is a list of Fulbright Scholars from the University of Belgrade's Law School.

- Oliver Antić, University of Michigan, 1968/1969
- Sima Avramović, University of Maryland, 1983/1984
- Vesna Besarević, University of South Carolina, 1988/1989
- Vlajko Brajić, Western Michigan University, 1969/1970
- Vojin Dimitrijević, University of Virginia, 1984/1985
- Jovan Djordjević, Claremont Graduate School, 1980/1981
- Miroljub Labus, Cornell University, 1983/1984
- Stevan Lilić, University of Minnesota, 1985/1986
- Stevan Lilić, University of Pittsburgh, 2001/2002
- Ivan Maksimović, University at Albany, SUNY, 1980/1981
- Zoran Milovanović, The George Washington University, 1980/1981
- Miroslav Petrović, Western Michigan University and University of California, 1971/1972
- Dejan Popović, University of Maryland, 1984/1985
- Zagorka Simić, New York University, 1970/1971
- Radoslav Stojanović, University of North Carolina, 1980/1981
- Radoslav Stojanović, University of North Carolina, 1985/1986

Junior Faculty Development Program (JFDP Scholars):

- Balsa Kašćelan, University of Pittsburgh, 2004/2005
- Nenad Tešić, Brooklyn Law School, 2004/2005
- Sanja Gligić, University of Pittsburgh, 2004/2005

Ron Brown Scholars:

- Svetislava Bulajić, University of Connecticut, 1997/1998
- Marija Karanikić, Duke University, 2001/2002

== Sources ==
- The Fulbright Alumni Association of Serbia
