= João Parvi =

French-Portuguese prelate

- Bishop of Santiago de Cabo Verde
- Diocese: Roman Catholic Diocese of Santiago de Cabo Verde
- In office: 23 September 1839 - 29 December 1546
- Predecessor: Brás Neto
- Successor: Francisco da Cruz

Personal details
- Born: 1480 Bayonne, France
- Died: December 29, 1546 (aged 65–66) Ribeira Grande, Cape Verde

João Parvi (Latin: Ioannes Parvi or Ioannes Pettit), also known as D. João de Évora (1480 - 29 November 1546) was a French-Portuguese prelate.

== Biography ==
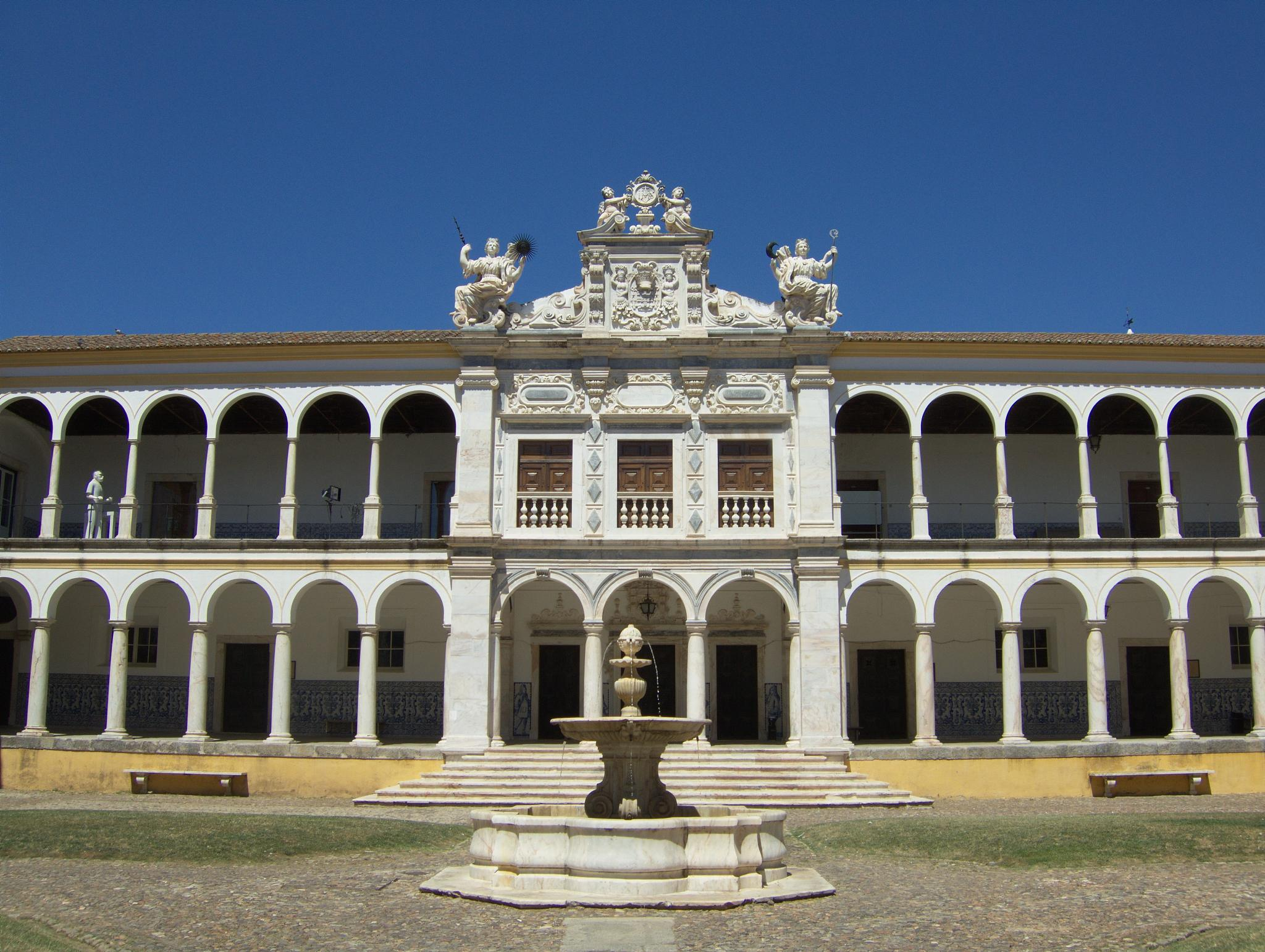
Évora University

Parvi was born in the Diocese of Bayonne in Aquitaine in the southwest of France under the name Jean Petit, he became a naturalized Portuguese citizen under John III of Portugal.

He was documented as a teacher in 1520 at the University of Lisbon as General Studies. He was a part of a humanist group at the University of Évora.

=== Ecclesiastical career ===
He was member at the prestige See of Évora which was used as an archdeacon and a canon magistrate.

As contemporary of Martin of Portugal who had been sent to the Papal States in Rome for the creation of Dioceses of Anga, Cape Verde, São Tomė and Goa, in which he had influence in its school.

On 23 September 1538, he became the second Bishop of Cape Verde. He succeeded Brás Neto who was in Lisbon and did not fully become an archbishop.

Also on 23 September 1538, he headed to the Roman Curia. However he went to reside for the bishop's seat, heremained in his estate in Évora up to 1545. In September, he made a will, he left his heir to his nephew Reginaldo Parvi, on that document, he was going to the island of Santiago in Cape Verde, probably at the end of 1545, where he became the first bishop resident.

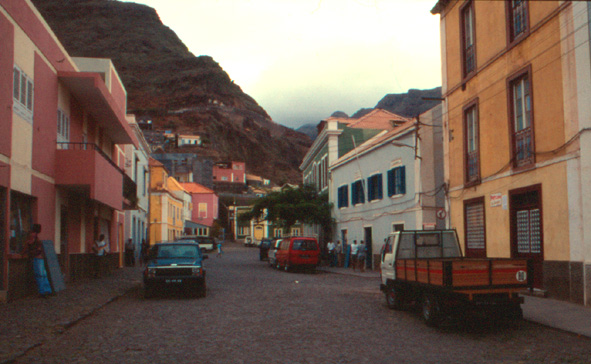
Ribeira Grande on the island of Santo Antão

=== Death ===
He died in Ribeira Grande on 29 December 1546, having served only a year on the episcopate. A sepulcher was put at the Nossa Senhora do Rosário (Our Lady of Rosary) church in Ribeira Grande He was succeeded by bishop Francisco da Cruz.

About a 120 years later, Manuel Severim da Faria commented an apologetic latter that D. Joāo Parvi was a sacrifice to church service.

Preceded by Brás Neto	Bishop of Cape Verde; 1538-1546	Succeeded by Francisco da Cruz
