= Game of Death II =

1981 Hong Kong film by Ng See-yuen

- UK cover for the H.K.L DVD containing the original theatrical release.
- Chinese: 死亡塔
- Hanyu Pinyin: Sǐwáng Tǎ
- Jyutping: Sei2 Mong4 Taap3
- Directed by: Ng See-yuen
- Written by: Ting Chak-luen; Ho Ting-sing
- Produced by: Raymond Chow
- Starring: Bruce Lee; Tong Lung; Huong Cheng Li; Roy Chiao; To Wai Wo; Hoi Sang Lee
- Cinematography: Leung Hei-man; Cheung Hoi; Danny Lee Yau-tong; Hoh Tin-shing
- Edited by: Peter Cheung
- Music by: Frankie Chan
- Distributed by: Golden Harvest
- Release date: March 1980
- Running time: 96 minutes
- Country: Hong Kong
- Language: Cantonese
- Box office: US$349,181

Game of Death II, also known as Tower of Death (Chinese: 死亡塔) or The New Game of Death, is a 1980 Hong Kong martial arts film directed by Ng See-yuen and starring Bruce Lee, Tong Lung, Huong Cheng Li and Roy Horan. This film was marketed as a sequel to Bruce Lee's last and only partially completed film Game of Death. Bruce Lee died some years before the production of Game of Death II and most of his scenes are taken from Lee's older films, mostly Enter the Dragon. Aside from the international English dub giving the "Bruce Lee" character the name Billy Lo, this movie appears to have no connection with Robert Clouse's 1978 version of Game of Death.

== Plot ==
After a recent number of challenges, Billy Lo (Bruce Lee) and his friend Chin Ku (Huong Cheng Li) begin to suspect that someone wants them dead. Billy later visits his younger brother Bobby (Tong Lung), who is studying with Billy's former teacher, and leaves him a book on Jeet Kune Do. Chin is soon killed and Billy goes to Japan to find his stepdaughter, May. May tells him that Chin had visited just before his death, and left a film for her. They are suddenly attacked, but Billy manages to escape with the film.

A few days later Billy attends Chin's funeral, where he is turned away from viewing the body. A helicopter arrives during the burial and steals the coffin away. Trying to prevent the theft, Billy is carried up with the casket but is shot in the neck and falls to his death. Bobby Lo is told of Billy's death by their father, who tells him to find a man named Sherman Lan and avenge his brother. Sherman gives him the film, which shows Chin Ku at the Palace of Death. The Palace of Death is run by a crazed martial arts expert by the name of Lewis (Roy Horan). Any challenger who fails to defeat Lewis is fed to his pack of lions. Bobby decides to meet Lewis, who is impressed with Bobby's abilities. While investigating the Palace, Bobby is attacked by a masked man. Then he informs Lewis that someone is trying to kill him. Later that night, a woman is sent to Bobby's room to seduce and assassinate him. When she fails, one of Lewis' lions attacks Bobby. During the fight, the masked man appears and kills Lewis.

Suspecting Lewis' valet, Bobby seeks him out at the Fan Yu temple, where the underground Tower of Death is rumored to be. After defeating the valet, Bobby spies the secret entrance into the tower. Battling his way through the tower he eventually confronts the operator, Chin Ku. Chin is the head of a global drug trafficking organization and staged his own death to throw off Interpol investigators. He tried to frame Lewis for his death and arranged for the coffin to be stolen to prevent it from being searched. Realizing the only way to defeat Chin's sword skills is with Billy's Jeet Kune Do, Bobby cold-heartedly uses Chin's sword, impales Chin's bodyguard monk (Lee Hoi-San) and Chin together, finally killing Chin and stopping his drug operation.

== Deleted scenes ==
Deleted scenes are available on DVD in both the international and English version as a special feature in Hong Kong Legends. One particular scene in the Chinese version of Game of Death, directed by Sammo Hung, was intended for his Asian audiences. In the Chinese version, Hung replaced the action scene in the opera house with another scene from the glasshouse at night with Casanova Wong in his karate clothes. The new fight scene, particularly the flips between Tong Lung and Yuen Biao, is reminiscent of Bruce Lee's fighting style.

== Versions ==
Much like the original Game of Death, there are several versions of Game of Death II.

- The first main version is the original Hong Kong version, titled Tower of Death (死亡塔). Most of this version's music was sourced from Les Baxter's score for The Dunwich Horror. This was approximately 86 minutes long, and is the version used in the U.K. Hong Kong Legends DVD.
- The second main version is the international English-dubbed version, retitled as Game of Death II. This does not remove any footage, but instead uses Bruce Lee and Lee-related stock footage to create new scenes, the most prominent being the above-mentioned greenhouse fight with Casanova Wong. Other scenes include a childhood montage of Billy Lo, taken from Lee's childhood films, and a funeral dedication, which uses footage from Bruce Lee's real funeral. However, it is done more tastefully than its use in Game of Death, since it appears as more of a real tribute to Lee than a movie funeral. The international version also includes a proper end credits montage. This version is more widely available than the original version, even appearing in the Hong Kong Bruce Lee Ultimate Collection DVD set.
- The third version is an extremely rare official South Korean print of the film. This uses more footage of the Korean actors Kim Tai-chung and Hwang Jang-lee (including an extended version of the sword demonstration with Hwang's character), while downplaying the Bruce Lee angle by cutting most of the stock footage of Lee.

== Cast ==
- Bruce Lee as Lee Chen-chiang (李振強) / Billy Lo (盧比利) in English dub (stock footage)
- Kim Tai-chung as Lee Chen-kwok (李振國) / Bobby Lo (盧博比) in English dub (doubling for Bruce Lee) (credited as Tong Lung)
- Hwang Jang-lee as Chin Ku (credited as Huong Cheng Li)
- Roy Horan as Lewis (credited as Roy Haron)
- Roy Chiao as The Abbot
- Ho Lee Yan as Billy's Father
- Casanova Wong as the Korean Martial Artist (Lau Yea-chun)
- To Wai-Wo as Lewis' Servant
- Hoi Sang Lee as the Bald Monk
- Mars as Guard in the Cave
- Miranda Austin as Angel
- Tiger Yang as Strongman in Leopard Suit
- Yuen Biao as Blue Staff Monk
- Bolo Yeung as the Guard

== Soundtracks ==
- Dancer - performed by Gino Soccio (only in Cantonese/Mandarin versions)
- Jealousy - performed by Amii Stewart (only in Korean theatrical version)

== Box office ==
In Hong Kong, the film grossed HK$1,950,391 (US$348,970). In South Korea, the film's 2016 re-release grossed ₩245,000 (US$211) in Seoul City, adding up to at least US$349,181 grossed in East Asia.

== Home media ==
=== DVD releases ===
Universe (Hong Kong)

- Aspect ratio: widescreen (2:35:1) letterboxed
- Sound: Cantonese (Dolby Digital 5.1), Mandarin (Dolby Digital 5.1)
- Subtitles: Traditional, Simplified Chinese, English, Japanese, Indonesian, Malaysian, Thai, Korean, Vietnamese
- Supplements: stars' files, trailer, trailers for The Big Boss, Enter the Dragon, Game of Death and Legacy of Rage
- All regions, NTSC

Fortune Star – Bruce Lee Ultimate DVD Collection (Hong Kong)

- Released: 29 April 2004
- Aspect ratio: widescreen (2:35:1) anamorphic
- Sound: English (DTS 5.1), English (Dolby Digital 5.1), English (2.0 Mono)
- Subtitles: Traditional, Simplified Chinese, English
- Supplements: original trailer, new trailer, celebrity interviews, still photos, slideshow of photos, Game of Death outtakes, unseen footage, Enter the Dragon alternative opening credits, 32-page booklet
- Region 3, NTSC

Fox (America)

- Released: 25 May 2005
- Aspect ratio: widescreen (2:35:1) anamorphic
- Sound: English (DTS 5.1), English (Dolby Digital 5.1)
- Subtitles: English
- Supplements: Original trailer, new trailer, bonus trailers
- Region 1, NTSC

Fox – Bruce Lee Ultimate Collection (America)

- Released: 18 October 2005
- Aspect ratio: widescreen (2:35:1) anamorphic
- Sound: English (DTS 5.1), English (Dolby Digital 5.1), English (Dolby Digital 2.0 Mono)
- Subtitles: English
- Supplements: original trailer, new trailer, Game of Death outtakes, bonus trailers, still photos, slideshow of photos
- Region 1, NTSC

Hong Kong Legends (United Kingdom)

- Released: 5 November 2001
- Aspect ratio: widescreen (2:35:1) anamorphic
- Sound: Cantonese (Dolby Digital 2.0 Surround), English (Dolby Digital 2.0 Surround)
- Subtitles: English, Dutch
- Supplements: commentary by Bey Logan and Roy Horan, original trailer, HKL promotional trailer, biography showcases, bonus trailers, interviews with actors Casanova Wong and Roy Horan, deleted scenes (in English)
- Regions 2/4, PAL

=== Blu-ray releases ===
Criterion - Bruce Lee: His Greatest Hits (America)

- Released: 14 July 2020
- Aspect ratio: widescreen (2:30:1) anamorphic
- Sound: English (Dolby Digital 2.0 Mono)
- Subtitles: none
- Supplements: none
- Notes: upscaled from standard definition source
- Region A

Arrow Video - Bruce Lee at Golden Harvest (United Kingdom)

- Released: 17 July 2023
- Aspect ratio: widescreen (2:35:1) anamorphic
- Sound: Cantonese (1.0 Mono), English (1.0 Mono), Mandarin (1.0 Mono), Alternate English (1.0 Mono)
- Subtitles: English, English SDH
- Supplements: Hong Kong Cut titled Tower of Death, Korean Version, US Video Version
- Notes: All cuts of the film are presented in HD from the best elements possible, 4K version also released
- Region B

== See also ==
- List of Hong Kong films
