= Luigi Vagnetti =

Italian architect (1915–1980)

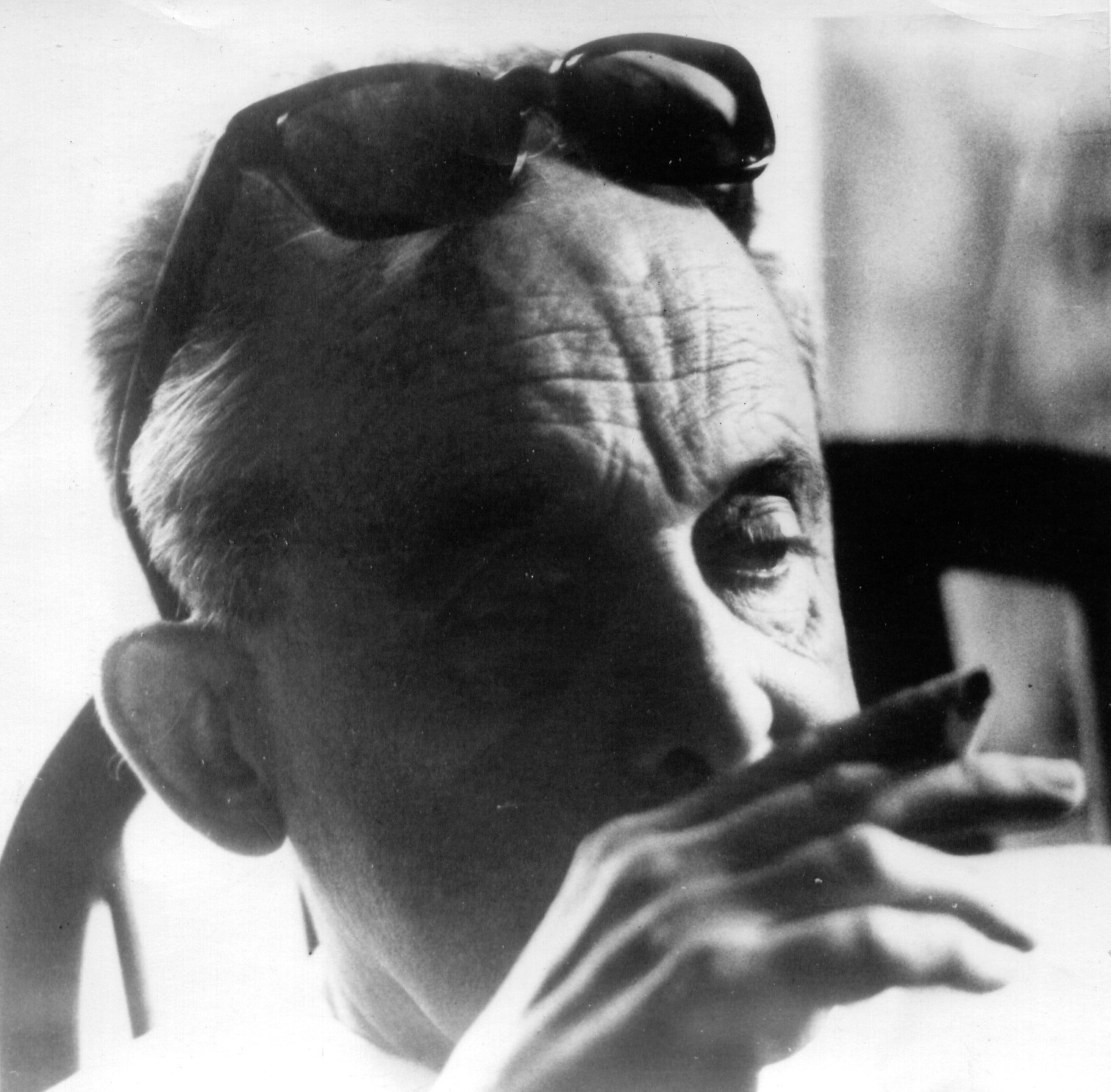
- Vagnetti in 1973
- Born: 20 April 1915; Rome, Kingdom of Italy
- Died: 26 October 1980 (aged 65); Rome, Italy
- Education: Sapienza University of Rome
- Occupations: Architect, academic

Luigi Vagnetti (20 April 1915 – 26 October 1980) was an Italian architect, urban planner and architectural historian. He was a professor of architecture at the universities of Palermo, Genoa and Florence, and designed numerous public buildings, churches, housing developments and urban plans in Italy and Tunisia.

== Life and career ==
Born in Rome, Vagnetti graduated in architecture from the Sapienza University in 1938. He began his academic career as an assistant to Arnaldo Foschini and Saverio Muratori and later taught at the universities of Palermo, Genoa and Florence. He served as director of the urban planning bureau advising the Tunisian government between 1960 and 1970.

Alongside his academic work, Vagnetti maintained an extensive architectural practice. He designed INA-Casa housing estates, churches, public buildings and urban plans, including thirteen master plans in Tunisia. Among his best-known works are the Palazzo Grande in Livorno, the Bank of Italy branch in Cremona, the Due Madonne housing district in Bologna, and the church of Madre della Chiesa in Foggia. In Rome, he designed the Ponte Mammolo housing estate, the Palazzo dell'Urbanistica and the Ministry of Posts and Telecommunications headquarters at EUR, and the church of San Timoteo.

Vagnetti was a member of the Accademia delle Arti del Disegno and the Accademia di San Luca, and played a leading role in establishing the Unione Italiana per il Disegno (UID). He died in Rome in 1980 and was buried in Anghiari.

== Sources ==
- Mele, Giampiero (2020). "Vagnetti, Luigi". Dizionario Biografico degli Italiani. Vol. 97. Istituto dell'Enciclopedia Italiana.
- Cataldi, Giancarlo; Rossi, Michela, eds. (2000). Luigi Vagnetti architetto (Roma, 1915–1980). Disegni, progetti, opere (in Italian). Florence: Alinea.
