= Caritas Cape Verde =

Catholic social welfare and development organisation in Cape Verde

- Caritas Caboverdiana
- Established: 1 February 1976; 50 years ago
- Type: Nonprofit
- Purpose: social welfare, social justice
- Location: Praia, Cape Verde
- Origins: Catholic Social Teaching
- Services: social services, humanitarian aid
- Official language: Portuguese
- President: Bishop Ildo Fortes
- Affiliations: Caritas Internationalis, Caritas Africa

Caritas Cape Verde (Portuguese: Caritas Caboverdiana) is a not-for-profit social welfare organisation in Cape Verde. It is a service of the Catholic Church in Cape Verde and was established in 1976.

== Structure ==
The organisation follows the structure of the Catholic Church and consists of a national office (Caritas Cape Verde) and of two diocesan structures, Caritas Diocesana de Santiago and Cáritas Diocesana do Mindelo. These are in turn working through 41 local parish organisations.

Caritas Cape Verde is a member of both Caritas Africa and Caritas Internationalis.

== Work ==
The Caritas network in Cape Verde is active in several sectors. It provides its support to the people most vulnerable indiscriminately, regardless of their religion, nationality or political affiliation.

Caritas provides a range of support services aimed at addressing both immediate needs and long-term development. This includes basic social support, such as the distribution of essential food baskets or school kits to families in need, as well as educational assistance. To ensure interventions are appropriate and targeted, Caritas staff and volunteers carry out household visits, during which they assess the families' situations. Based on this initial diagnosis, specific needs are identified and a project is developed in a participatory manner. Funding is then sought from national and international partners and donors.

A significant part of Caritas’ work focuses on development, with the aim of fostering self-sufficiency among individuals and families, while also promoting the overall well-being of the community. This may involve construction or renovation activities, such as building cisterns—including in schools—bathrooms, pigpens, and chicken coops, or distributing fruit trees and livestock for breeding purposes. A variety of training and support programmes are also offered, covering areas such as food security, agriculture and livestock management, dressmaking, and domestic services.

In addition to developmental efforts, Caritas also provides humanitarian assistance in response to emergencies, such as natural disasters (storms, drought, etc.) or the COVID-19 pandemic. This support includes the distribution of food and non-food items—such as mattresses, kitchen and bedroom kits, bed linen, stoves, clothing, and medicines—as well as covering school-related expenses like monthly fees and supplies.
