= Miss, Please Be Patient =

- Hangul: 아가씨 참으세요
- RR: Agassi chameuseyo
- MR: Agassi ch'amŭseyo
- Directed by: Lee Hyung Pyo
- Starring: Kim Tai-chung; Jeong Yun-hui
- Distributed by: Dong A Exports Ltd
- Release date: September 19, 1981
- Running time: 105 minutes
- Language: Korean

Miss, Please Be Patient (Korean: 아가씨 참으세요; RR: Agassi chameuseyo) is a 1981 South Korean romantic comedy action film starring Kim Tai-chung and Jeong Yun-hui. The movie is also known as Super Lady Hopper as an alternate title. Outside of South Korea, the film is known for Kim Tai-chung's rarest South Korean film appearance. It was directed by Lee Hyung Pyo and released domestically on September 19, 1981, and re-release through the streaming website with likes of LG Uplus+ in 2020. The international release was cancelled until the film was discovered and release through the limited DVD release in 2011.

== Plot ==
Mr. Jun, the head of a Taiwanese shipbuilding company, was murdered by Pang, who is vice-president of the company. Pang decided to take over the company, but his plan did not progress smoothly because Jun's daughter Li-Hwa (Jeong Yun-hui) inherits his fortune.

Meanwhile, Li-Hwa spends her day playing tennis and learning kung fu from her friend Hyun-Hee (Seo Yeong-ran) who is a Taekwondo master. However Li-Hwa's skill in Taekwondo gave her a hard task since Pang and his gang were attempt to kidnap her. Even worse, Pang hires Hong Kong triads so that they can force Li-Hwa to sign the inherited contract.

When Li-Hwa is kidnapped, Hyun-Hee decided to rescue her and get help from the mysterious man Kim Min-wuk (Kim Tai-chung) who had fallen in love to Li-Hwa. Hyun-Hee and Min-wuk rescue Li-Hwa safely at the end.

== Cast ==
- Kim Tai-chung as Kim Min-wuk
- Jeong Yun-hui as Li-Hwa
- Seo Yeong-ran as Hyun-Hee
- Kwon Yeong-mun as Pang
- Roman Lee Gang Jo
- Bae Su Cheon
- Ahn So Yeong
- Baek Hwang Gi
- Park Dong Ryong

== Background ==
The movie was only screened in South Korea in 1981, and after that the movie was considered to be lost except for a few VHS copies. The movie was not revealed to an international audience fully until 2011, when the movie was rediscovered by Houndslow Team, a group of martial arts fans who were tracking down rare kung fu action movies and releasing them on DVD.

== Reception ==
Despite with the big names with the likes of Jeong Yun-hui and Kim Tai Chung's initial marketing campaign with being Bruce Lee's double in Game of Death, the film was a box office failure, gaining only the local Korean audiences of 22352 viewers only.

Despite with the financial failure, the film was critically praised among the critiques and the cult film fans in South Korea. Many of the Korean audiences praised for Jeong Yun Hui's comedic performance. The article from Cinema Heaven Volume 30 from Korean Movie Database, critique Park Hae Gyeong quoted "While most of Hui's role in her filmography were mostly ruined from the erotic romance film typecast, director Lee Hyeong Pyo's "Miss, Please Be Patient" stands out from her filmography, in which she takes an unusual comedic role from her comfort zones of the romance films and she exceeds in giving us the lovely performance with her cheerful spirit, smile, and laugh".

== Media release ==
Kim Tai-chung stated that he was planned to release the movie on DVD, but before he could release it, he died by stomach hemorrhage. The movie was released only few copy of VHS tapes in 1981. In 2011, Houndslow Team released the movie on DVD in a 4:3 aspect ratio remastered version with English subtitles.

As of 2020, the fully remastered Wide-screen version of the film is available through LG Uplus+ LTE Video Portal with the exclusive subscriptions only in South Korea.
