= San Timoteo, Rome =

San Timoteo
- Church of Saint Timothy
- Chiesa di San Timoteo a Casal Palocco
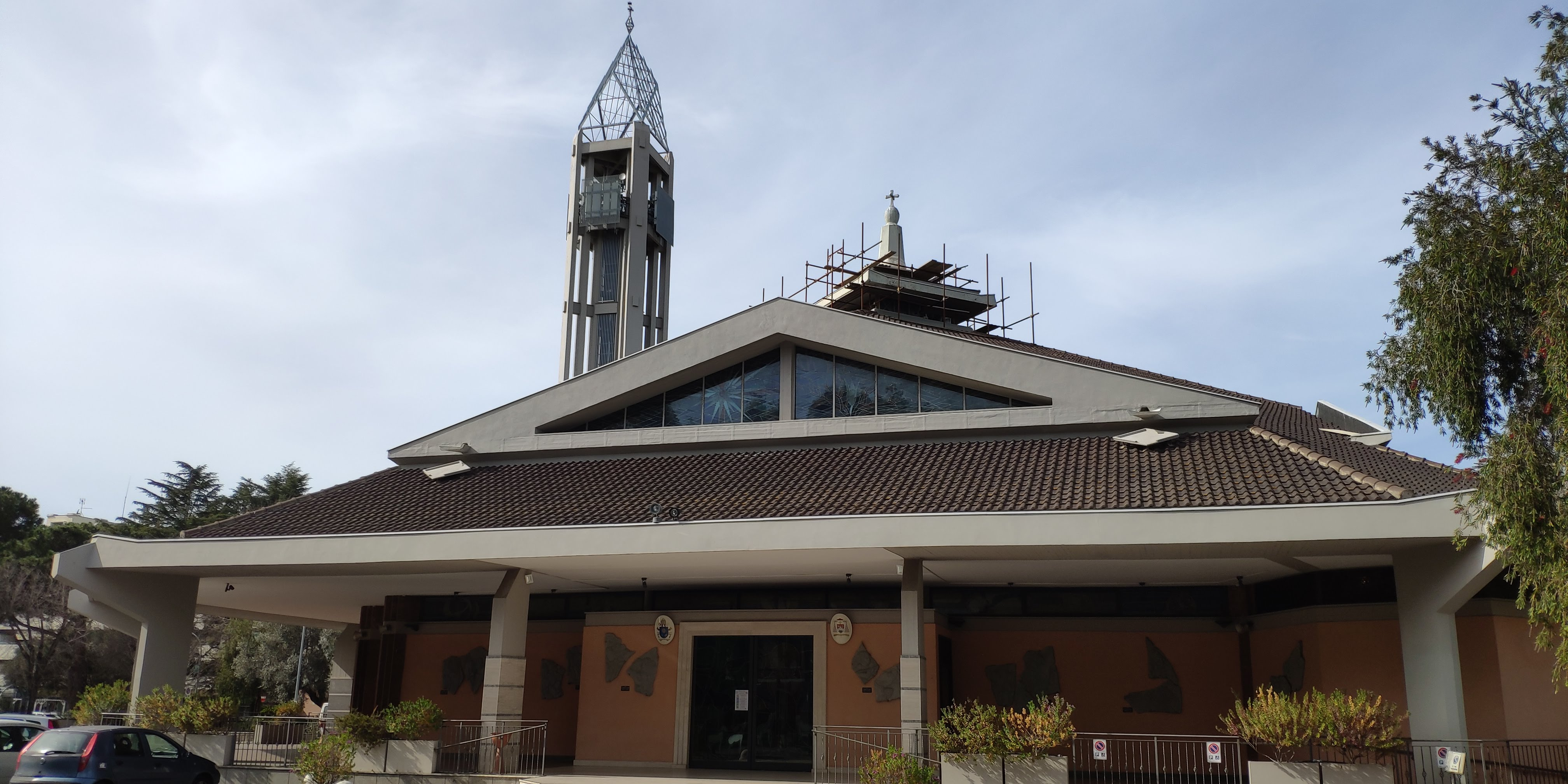
- Click on the map for a fullscreen view
- 41°45′08″N 12°21′22″E
- Location: Via Apelle 1, Casal Palocco, Rome
- Country: Italy
- Language: Italian
- Denomination: Catholic
- Tradition: Roman Rite
- Website: santimoteo.org

History
- Status: titular church
- Dedication: Saint Timothy
- Consecrated: 1970

Architecture
- Architect: Luigi Vagnetti
- Architectural type: Modern
- Groundbreaking: 1968
- Completed: 1970

Specifications
- Capacity: 800

Administration
- Diocese: Rome

The Church of San Timoteo (Italian: la chiesa di San Timoteo) is a 20th-century parochial church and titular church in the southwest suburbs of Rome, dedicated to Saint Timothy.

== History ==
The church is square in shape with rounded corners and is covered with a pagoda-style roof. It was built in 1968–70 on land donated by the Società Generale Immobiliare.

On 14 February 2015, it was made a titular church to be held by a cardinal-priest.

Cardinal-protectors

- Arlindo Gomes Furtado (2015–present)
