= João Crisóstomo de Amorim Pessoa =

19th-century Portuguese Catholic bishop

- Archbishop of Braga
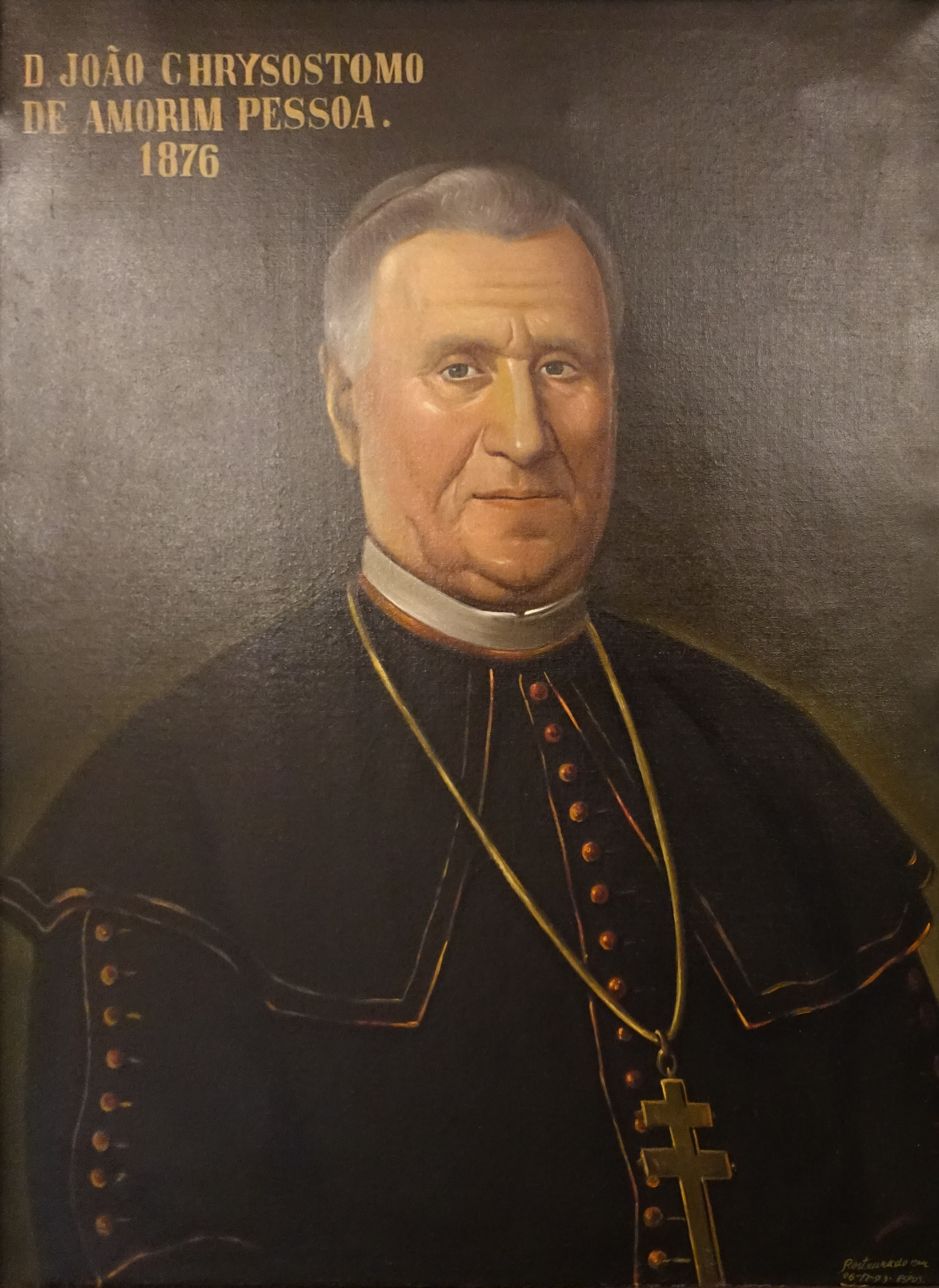
- Archdiocese: Roman Catholic Diocese of Santiago de Cabo Verde
- Diocese: Roman Catholic Diocese of Santiago de Cabo Verde
- In office: 1876-1883
- Predecessor: José Joaquim de Azevedo e Moura
- Successor: António José de Freitas Honorato

Personal details
- Born: 14 October 1810; Cantanhede, Portugal
- Died: 22 December 1888 (aged 78); Dume, Portugal

João Crisóstomo de Amorim Pessoa (14 October 1810 – 22 December 1888) was a Portuguese bishop. He was Bishop of Santiago de Cabo Verde and archbishop of Goa and Braga.

== Biography ==
Pessoa was born on 14 October 1810 in Cantanhede in the district of Coimbra, he was taught in 1827.

Pessoa was a teacher in theology at the University of Coimbra in 1850. He was professor in ecclesiastical sciences at the seminary in Coimbra and a substitute teacher at the Faculty of Theology in 1865.

In 1860, Pessoa became Bishop of Santiago de Cabo Verde which was ordained on 26 August, less than a year he left, by cardinal Manuel Bento Rodrigues da Silva. Less than a year after, he became Archbishop of Goa which was confirmed in 1861 and became in 1862. He made his entry into the city of Janeiro in 1862. At the Rachol Seminary, he founded a rich library.

The governor José Guedes de Carvalho e Meneses conceded in 1868 for authorization for returning the metropolis.

In 1877, Pessoa returned to Portugal and became archbishop of Braga. He disliked the diocese circumscription in 1882, which reduced the area of the diocese of Braga when parts were joined with Porto. He resigned in June 1883 and he retired to São João Baptista de Cabanas in the parish (now subdivision) of Dume in Braga. His tomb is at Misericórdia church in Cantahede.

Catholic Church titles
Preceded by Patrício Xavier de Moura	Bishop of Santiago de Cape Verde; 1860-1861	Succeeded by José Luis Alves Feijó
Preceded by José Maria da Silva Torres	Archbishop of Goa; 1862-1874	Succeeded by Aires de Ornelas e Vasconcelos
Preceded by José Joaquim de Azevedo e Moura	Archbishop of Braga; 1876-1883	Succeeded by António José de Freitas Honorato
