= Jackie and Bruce to the Rescue =

- 雙輩
- Directed by: Wu Chia Chun; Choe Dong Joon
- Starring: Tong Lung; Lee Siu-Ming; Eagle Han-ying
- Distributed by: Lucky Star Film. Co
- Release date: 1982
- Running time: 90 minutes
- Language: Mandarin

Jackie and Bruce to the Rescue also known as Fist of Death is 1982 Taiwanese Bruceploitation martial arts movie, starring Kim Tai Chung and Lee Siu Ming.

== Plot ==
The YMCA and Ching Wu school is under attack from the secret gang, which ultimately puts both school into the rivalry. In order to solve the case of the cause of this whole disaster and Ching Wu school's master's death, Bruce (Tong Lung) and Jackie (Lee Siu Ming) must solve for the case once and for all who's all behind this massacre.

== Casts ==
- Kim Tae Jeong as Brother Bruce
- Li Hsiao Ming as "Jackie" (Rikisha Man)
- Kim Young Il as Ching Wu student (Guest)
- Jang Il Shink as Big Boss
- Chang Shan as YMCA Thug
- Wang Pao Yu as Bruce's Love Interest
- Ma Sha as Ching Wu student
- Hei Ying as the Final boss

== Reception ==
The movie received generally negative reviews from the audience. IMDb gave the score out of 4.5/10. "You’d think a film featuring a Bruce Lee clone AND a Jackie Chan clone (not to mention maverick exploitation producer Dick Randall’s name on the credits) would be a lot of fun, but well, no, it’s not."

== Home media ==
The film was first introduced to the home DVD media around 2004. The remastered edition was discovered from Baidu.com with full Mandarin dubbed version.
