= George Naghi =

Romanian businessman (1952 - 2011)

George Naghi (25 February 1952 in Călăraşi, Călărași County – 7 August 2011 in the Danube Delta region) was a Romanian businessman and millionaire, founder of Aldis SRL meat products enterprise. He founded the firm together with his wife Alina in the 1990s.

Naghi died in a boating accident on 7 August 2011 while on a personal ship cruise with his wife on the Danube Delta. His wife survived the accident and received medical treatment for minor injuries. On his burial day, local authorities declared a mourning day in the city of Călăraşi in honour of his achievements for the citizens of the city and public commitment for helping the local economy throughhis enterprise in creating employment.
