= Kim Tai-chung =

South Korean martial artist, actor and businessman

- Born: June 5, 1957; South Korea
- Died: August 27, 2011 (aged 54); South Korea
- Other names: Kim Tai-jong; Tong Lung (唐龍; Chinese stage name)
- Occupations: Actor; martial artist
- Years active: 1977–1986

Korean name
- Hangul: 김태정
- Hanja: 金泰靖
- RR: Gim Taejeong
- MR: Kim T'aejŏng

Kim Tai-chung (June 5, 1957 – August 27, 2011), also known as Kim Tai-jong or Tong Lung (唐龍; Chinese stage name), was a South Korean martial artist, actor and businessman. A Taekwondo practitioner, he is best known for his martial arts films.

Born in Pusan, Kim made his first Hong Kong movie debut in the 1977 film Snuff Bottle Connection, along with Hwang Jang-lee and Roy Horan. He went on to star in Raymond Chow's Golden Harvest classics Game of Death (1978) and Game of Death II (1981). He also starred in the South Korean romantic comedy action Miss, Please Be Patient (1981), the Taiwanese Bruceploitation martial arts film Jackie and Bruce to the Rescue (1982), and the martial arts film No Retreat, No Surrender (1986), along with Jean-Claude Van Damme and Kurt McKinney. Kim was one of two stand-ins for Bruce Lee (along with Yuen Biao) used to complete Game of Death after Lee died during filming. Kim also played the ghost of Bruce Lee in No Retreat, No Surrender.

== History and early career ==
=== Acting ===
In the 1970s, Kim made his first Hong Kong movie debut in 1977 film Snuff Bottle Connection, along with Hwang Jang-lee and Roy Horan. Kim played Bruce Lee's character Billy Lo in 1978 film Game of Death, alongside Yuen Biao (who performed the acrobatics and stunts), Kim played Lee's character so well that the producers used him again a few years later.

In the 1980s, Kim played Bobby Lo in 1981 film Game of Death II alongside Hwang Jang-lee, Roy Horan, To Wai-wo and Lee Hoi-san. After Game of Death II, Kim returned to Korea and made his one and only Korean film, Miss, Please Be Patient (아가씨 참으세요), along with former Korean beauty queen and romantic film star Jeong Yun-hui. This movie was a commercial failure despite receiving praise from film critics.

Kim later joined a Korean and Taiwanese production again in the role of Bruce Lee in the 1982 film Jackie vs. Bruce to the Rescue (also known as Fist of Death) along with Lee Siu-ming, a Taiwanese stuntman and Jackie Chan look alike. A commercial and critical failure, this film caused him to take a break from acting.

In June 1985, Chinese film producer Ng See-yuen was looking for an actor to play the ghost of Bruce Lee in the 1986 film No Retreat, No Surrender. This would be Kim's American debut and final movie plus the film debut of Belgian martial arts actor Jean-Claude Van Damme as Ivan Kraschinsky. Kim played Bruce Lee's ghost who trains Kurt McKinney's character.

=== Retired from acting ===
After No Retreat, No Surrender, Kim returned to Korea and retired from acting at the age of 29 and became a businessman.

In 2008, Kim made a rare public appearance in Korea as part of a screening of Miss, Please Be Patient, which had originally been released in 1981. Kim had played a leading role in that film.

== Death ==
On August 27, 2011, Kim died of stomach hemorrhage at 54.

He had been preparing to make a new movie but suddenly collapsed during a meeting with friends and died at a hospital. He was buried at the Buddhist temple Obongjeong in Uiwang, Gyeonggi Province. Fans kept posting memorial messages on online cafes and even opened a memorial cafe for him despite nearly no mention of his passing by the media.

== Filmography ==
=== Film ===
- Snuff Bottle Connection (1977)
- Game of Death (1978)
- Game of Death II (1981)
- Miss, Please Be Patient (1981)
- Jackie and Bruce to the Rescue (1982)
- No Retreat, No Surrender (1986)

=== Documentary ===
- Bruce Lee, the Man and the Legend (1984)
