= Diocese of Ponta de Pedras =

Catholic ecclesiastical territory

Diocese of Ponta de Pedras Dioecesis Petrosi Culminis Diocese de Ponta de Pedras

Location
- Country: Brazil
- Ecclesiastical province: Belém do Pará
- Metropolitan: Belém do Pará

Statistics
- Area: 14,283 km^{2} (5,515 sq mi)
- Population: Total; Catholics: (as of 2004); 120,000; 108,000 (90,7%)

Information
- Rite: Latin Rite
- Established: 25 June 1963 (62 years ago)
- Cathedral: Cathedral of the Immaculate Conception in Ponta de Pedras

Current leadership
- Pope: Leo XIV
- Bishop: Teodoro Mendes Tavares, C.S.Sp.
- Metropolitan Archbishop: Júlio Endi Akamine
- Bishops emeritus: Alessio Saccardo, S.J.

The Diocese of Ponta de Pedras (Latin: Dioecesis Petrosi Culminis) is a diocese located in the city of Ponta de Pedras in the ecclesiastical province of Belém do Pará in Brazil.

== History ==
- June 25, 1963: Established as Territorial Prelature of Ponta de Pedras from Metropolitan Archdiocese of Belém do Pará
- October 16, 1979: Promoted as Diocese of Ponta de Pedras

== Bishops ==
=== Ordinaries (in reverse chronological order) ===
- Bishops of Ponta de Pedras (Roman rite)
  - Bishop Teodoro Mendes Tavares, C.S.Sp. (2015.09.23 - )
  - Bishop Alessio Saccardo, S.J. (2002.01.16 – 2015.09.23)
  - Bishop Angelo Maria Rivato, S.J. (83) (1979.10.16 – 2002.01.16)
- Prelates of Ponta de Pedras (Roman rite)
  - Bishop Angelo Maria Rivato, S.J. (1965.04.29 – 1979.10.16)

=== Coadjutor bishop ===
- Teodoro Mendes Tavares, C.S.Sp. (2015)

== Sources ==
- GCatholic.org
- Catholic Hierarchy
