= Pierpaolo Spangaro =

Italian swimmer (1942–2011)

Personal information
- Born: 26 June 1942 Trieste, Italy
- Died: 12 August 2011 (aged 69) Lignano Sabbiadoro, Italy

Sport
- Sport: Swimming
Medal record
Representing Italy
Summer Universiade
Bronze medal – third place	1963 Porto Alegre	4x100m freestyle relay

Pierpaolo Spangaro (26 June 1942 – 12 August 2011) was an Italian swimmer. He competed at the 1960 Summer Olympics and the 1964 Summer Olympics.
