= Patrick Guillemin =

French actor (1950–2011)

- Born: Patrice Alain Pierre Guillemin; 13 November 1950; Neuilly-sur-Seine, Hauts-de-Seine, France
- Died: 21 August 2011 (aged 60); Cap Ferret, Gironde, France
- Occupation: Actor
- Years active: 1973–2011

Patrick Alain Pierre Guillemin (13 November 1950 – 21 August 2011) was a French actor.
