= Angelo Maria Rivato =

First Catholic bishop of the Diocese of Ponta de Pedras, Brazil

Diocese of Ponta de Pedras Angelo Maria Rivato
- Roman Catholic Diocese of Ponta de Pedras
- Church: Catholic Church
- Appointed: October 16, 1979
- Installed: October 16, 1979
- Term ended: June 9, 2009
- Predecessor: Office established
- Successor: Alessio Saccardo

Personal details
- Born: December 3, 1924
- Died: August 20, 2011 (aged 86)

Angelo Maria Rivato (December 3, 1924 – August 20, 2011) was an Italian-born Jesuit priest who became the first Catholic bishop of the Diocese of Ponta de Pedras, Brazil.

== Biography ==
Born in San Giovanni Ilarione, Italy on December 3, 1924, Rivato was ordained to the priesthood for the Society of Jesus. In 1967 he was ordained bishop and was appointed the first bishop of the Ponta de Pedras Diocese.
