= F. M. Hardacre =

American football player and coach (1915–2011)

Biographical details
- Born: July 1, 1915 rural Smith County, Kansas, U.S.
- Died: August 7, 2011 (aged 96); Olathe, Kansas, U.S.

Playing career
- 1935–1937: Kansas

Coaching career (HC unless noted)
- 1948–1949: McPherson

Head coaching record
- Overall: 1–16

Forrest Marion "Frosty" Hardacre (July 1, 1915 – August 7, 2011) was an American football coach. He was the head football coach at McPherson College in McPherson, Kansas, serving for two seasons, from 1948 to 1949, and compiling a record of 1–16.

== Head coaching record ==
Year	Team	Overall	Conference	Standing	Bowl/playoffs
McPherson Bulldogs (Kansas Collegiate Athletic Conference) (1948–1949)
1948	McPherson	0–8	0–6	7th	
1949	McPherson	1–8	0–6	7th	
McPherson:		1–16	0–12		
Total:		1–16			
