= Vladimir Antakov =

Soviet hockey player (1957–2011)

Personal information
- Nationality: Soviet
- Born: 13 July 1957 Polevskoy, Soviet Union
- Died: 16 August 2011 (aged 54)

Sport
- Sport: Field hockey

Vladimir Antakov (13 July 1957 – 16 August 2011) was a Soviet field hockey player. He competed at the 1988 Summer Olympics and the 1992 Summer Olympics.
