= Patricia Acioli =

Brazilian judge (born 1964)

Judge
- In office 1992 – August 12, 2011

Patrícia Lourival Acioli (February 14, 1964 in Niterói - August 12, 2011 in Niterói) was a Brazilian judge and feminist. She was the first judge to be murdered in the State of Rio de Janeiro. Acioli championed the rights of battered women and fought against organized crime and corrupt police officers. She was murdered by masked men on motorbikes outside her house in 2011. Eleven police officers, including its chief, were convicted of planning and executing the murder.

In 1992, Acioli entered the judiciary through the Legal Service. Acioli taught Civil Law at the Centro Universitário Augusto Motta in the 1990s. Since 1999, she has sat at the Fourth Court of Criminal Section of São Gonçalo, Rio de Janeiro. She was characterized by applying stiffer penalties for drug dealers, gangsters and corrupt police.

On the night of August 11, 2011, Acioli returned to her vehicle at the Courts of São Gonçalo, where she worked and headed towards her home in the neighborhood of Piratininga in the city of Niterói. Arriving at her residence, she was killed by two masked men on a motorcycle, who fired "at least sixteen shots". Though she had received several death threats, she had no police protection. She was buried in Niteroi, leaving three children. The murder of Acioli reverberated throughout Brazil. The president of the Supreme Federal Court described the act as a premeditated "attack against Brazilian government and democracy". The Court ordered an investigation by the Federal Police.

According to the investigations, which were conducted by Deputy Felipe Ettore and Commissioner José Carlos Guimarães of the Homicide Division of the State of Rio de Janeiro, Patrícia's murder was committed by military police officers dissatisfied with their actions in relation to a group of agents who operated in the city of São Gonçalo committing homicides and extortion. In April 2014, all 11 police officers tried in the case were convicted by the courts.
