= Ronald N. Hartman =

American academic (1935–2011)

- Born: July 23, 1935; Milwaukee, Wisconsin, U.S.
- Died: August 30, 2011 (aged 76)
- Education: University of California, Los Angeles; California State University, Los Angeles
- Scientific career
- Fields: Earth Sciences; Astronomy; Cinematography
- Workplaces: Griffith Observatory; Mt. San Antonio College; R. N. Hartman, Inc.

Ronald N. Hartman (July 23, 1935 – August 30, 2011) was a professor of astronomy and the director of the planetarium at Mt. San Antonio College in Walnut, California for 38 years. He was also well known in the community of meteorite collectors and hunters.

== Education ==
Hartman earned his B.A. degree in astronomy from the University of California, Los Angeles and earned his M.A. degree in Education from California State University, Los Angeles.

== Career ==
Hartman studied astronomy at the University of California, Los Angeles under the famous meteoriticist Frederick C. Leonard, one of the founders of the Meteoritical Society. In the 1960s, Hartman worked at the Griffith Observatory giving lectures and began investigating California dry lakes for the presence of meteorites. He discovered the Lucerne Valley meteorites in 1963. Throughout his career he continued his search for meteorites at locations such as Meteor Crater, Arizona and Odessa, Texas. He built a large collection of meteorites, tektites, and shatter cones, many of which are on display at the Mt. San Antonio College Planetarium and library. In 2005, he founded R. N. Hartman, Inc., a company that manufactures membrane suspension boxes and distributes them around the world.

Hartman enjoyed teaching astronomy and continued to teach after his retirement in 2005. He was also interested in archaeoastronomy and traveled to Egypt to study astronomical alignments in ancient monuments.

== Awards and honors ==
Hartman was an active member in the Pacific Planetarium Association and the International Planetarium Society (ISP). He received the ISP Service Award in 1984, the organization's most prestigious honor. He also served as editor of the journal Planetarian from 1978 to 1981.
