= Diocese of Mindelo =

Roman Catholic diocese in Cape Verde

Coordinates: 16.8855°N 24.9883°W

Diocese of Mindelo Dioecesis Mindelensis
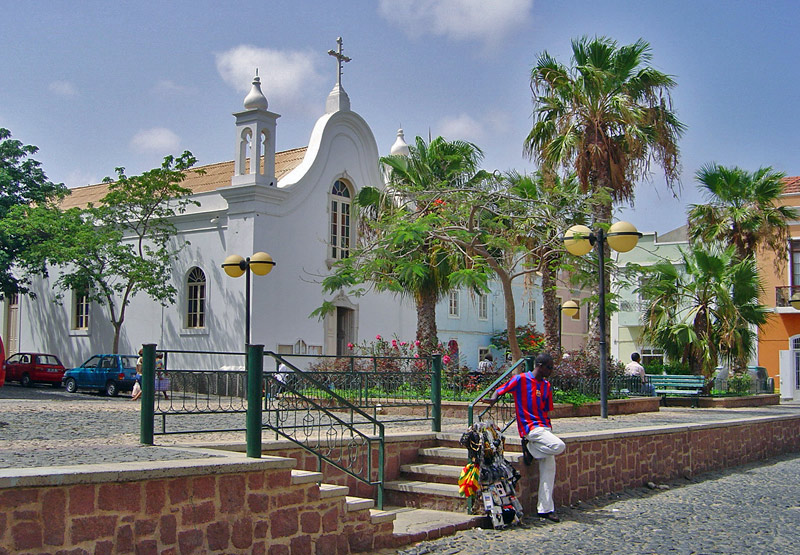
- Catedral Nossa Senhora da Luz

Location
- Country: Cape Verde
- Metropolitan: Immediately exempt to the Holy See

Statistics
- Area: 2,207 km^{2} (852 sq mi)
- Population: Total; Catholics: (as of 2004); 147,489; 140,114 (95.0%)

Information
- Denomination: Catholic Church
- Sui iuris church: Latin Church
- Rite: Roman Rite
- Cathedral: Catedral Nossa Senhora da Luz

Current leadership
- Pope: Leo XIV
- Bishop: Ildo Augusto Dos Santos Lopes Fortes

Website
- https://diocesemindelo.org/

The Diocese of Mindelo (Latin: Dioecesis Mindelensis) is a Latin Church ecclesiastical territory or diocese of the Catholic Church in Cabo Verde. Its cathedral is Catedral Nossa Senhora da Luz in the episcopal see of Mindelo. The diocese is immediately exempt to the Holy See and not part of any ecclesiastical province.

Cáritas Diocesana do Mindelo is the social arm of the diocese.

== History ==
- December 19, 2003: Established as Diocese of Mindelo from the Diocese of Santiago de Cabo Verde

== Bishops ==
- Arlindo Gomes Furtado (2004–2009), appointed Bishop of Santiago de Cabo Verde (Cardinal in 2015)
- Ildo Augusto Dos Santos Lopes Fortes (since January 25, 2011)

== See also ==
- Roman Catholicism in Cape Verde

== Sources ==
- GCatholic.org
- Catholic Hierarchy
