= Aldis SRL =

Romanian meat and smallgoods processing company

- Industry: Meat and smallgoods
- Headquarters: Călăraşi, Romania
- Website: aldis1990.ro

Aldis SRL is a Romanian meat and smallgoods processing company based in Călăraşi. The company has the capacity to produce 150 tonnes of products per day. It has an annual turnover of almost €70 million and over 1300 employees.

The founder of Aldis, George Naghi, was killed in a boating accident on 7 August 2011.
