= Radoslav Stojanović =

Serbian politician and professor

Radoslav Stojanović (Радослав Стојановић) (1930 – 31 August 2011) was a Serbian university professor. Stojanović was the Professor of Law at the University of Belgrade and was a member of the Founding Committee of the Democratic Party in December 1989. The Democratic Party was the first non-communist opposition party in Serbia.

== Biography ==
He was born in Obrenovac, Kingdom of Yugoslavia

Stojanović was the Chief Legal Representative of Serbia before the International Court of Justice in the lawsuit brought by Bosnia and Herzegovina against Serbia relating to the 1992–95 Bosnian War.

His daughter, Dubravka Stojanović, is a professor of history at University of Belgrade.
