= Diocese of Santiago de Cabo Verde =

Roman Catholic diocese in Cape Verde

Diocese of Santiago de Cabo Verde Dioecesis Sancti Iacobi Capitis Viridis Diocese de Santiago de Cabo Verde
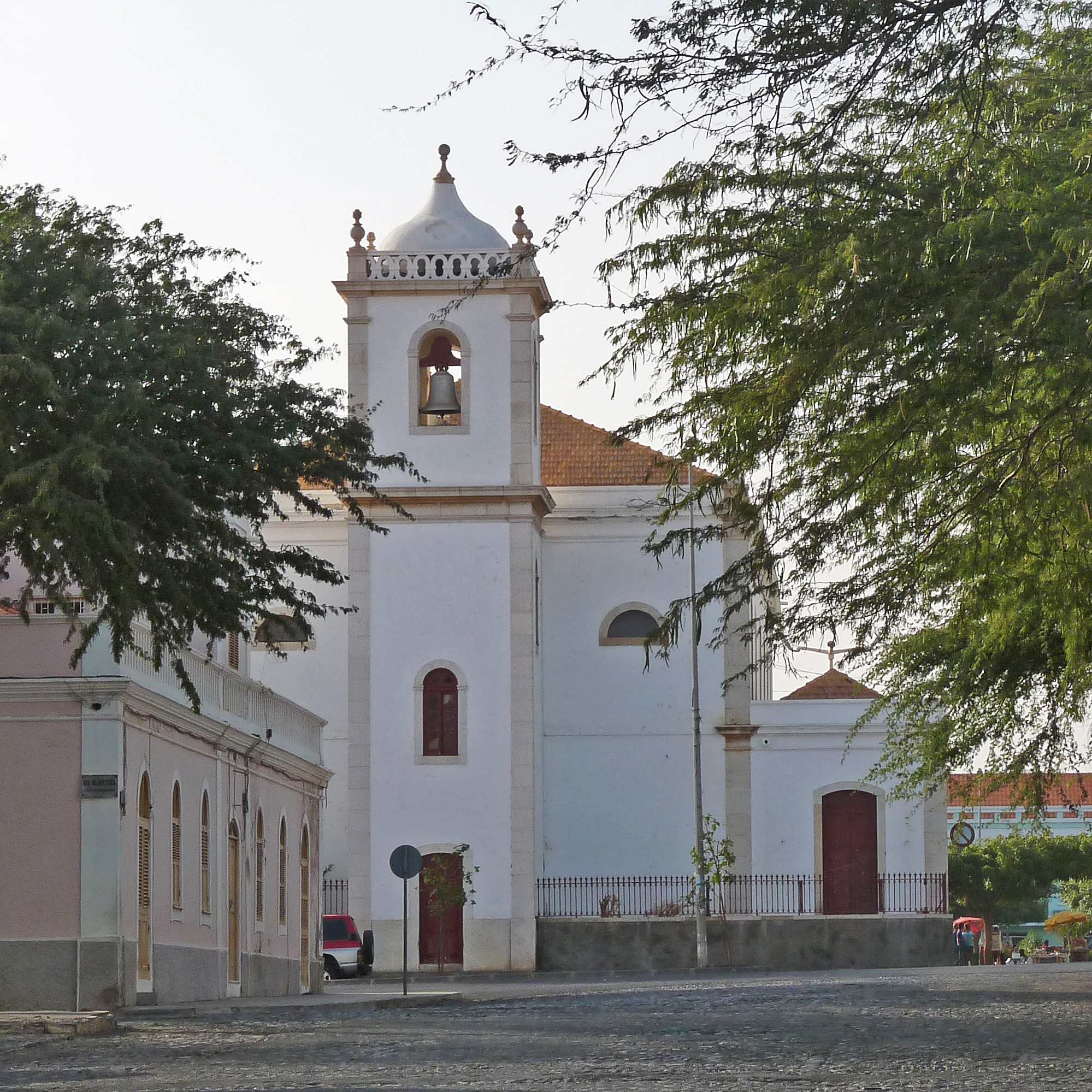
- Pró-catedral Nossa Senhora da Graça

Location
- Country: Cape Verde
- Metropolitan: Immediately exempt to the Holy See
- Headquarters: Praia, Cape Verde
- Coordinates: 14.9173°N 23.5086°W

Statistics
- Area: 1,832 km^{2} (707 sq mi)
- Population: Total; Catholics: (as of 2023); 468,890; 447,300 (95.4%)
- Parishes: 26

Information
- Denomination: Catholic Church
- Sui iuris church: Latin Church
- Rite: Roman Rite
- Established: 31 January 1533; 493 years ago
- Cathedral: Pró-catedral Nossa Senhora da Graça, Praia
- Patron saint: James the Less
- Secular priests: 49 (31 Diocesan, 18 Religious Orders)

Current leadership
- Pope: Leo XIV
- Bishop: Teodoro Mendes Tavares, C.S.Sp.
- Bishops emeritus: Arlindo Gomes Furtado

Website
- diocesesantiago.org

The Diocese of Santiago de Cabo Verde (Latin: Dioecesis Sancti Iacobi Capitis Viridis; Portuguese: Diocese de Santiago de Cabo Verde) is a Latin Church ecclesiastical territory or diocese of the Catholic Church in Cape Verde. It covers the islands of Maio, Santiago, Fogo, and Brava (the Sotavento Islands). Its cathedra is within the Pró-catedral Nossa Senhora da Graça in Praia, Santiago. The diocese is immediately exempt to the Holy See and is not part of any ecclesiastical province.

== History ==
The Diocese of Santiago de Cabo Verde was created on 31 January 1533, as a suffragan of the Archdiocese of Funchal (Madeira, Portugal) by Pope Clement VII. Its seat was Ribeira Grande, on Santiago. Bishop Francisco de la Cruz started construction of a cathedral in Ribeira Grande in 1556. Ribeira Grande went into decline in the 18th century, and the seat was moved to Ribeira Brava on São Nicolau in 1786, where it stayed until 1943. A seminary and an episcopal palace were built there.

Until 4 September 1940, the diocese covered not only the Cape Verde islands, but also Portuguese Guinea on the African mainland. Portuguese Guinea became a Mission sui iuris, the later Roman Catholic Diocese of Bissau. Since November 2003 the (northern) Barlavento Islands form the separate Roman Catholic Diocese of Mindelo, and the Diocese of Santiago de Cabo Verde only covers the (southern) Sotavento Islands.

Caritas Diocesana de Santiago is the social arm of the diocese.

== Leadership ==
=== Bishops of Santiago de Cabo Verde ===
- Brás Neto, O.F.M. (31 January 1533 – 9 February 1538)
- João Parvi (23 September 1538 – 29 November 1546)
- Francisco da Cruz, O.A.D. (18 August 1553 – March 1571), resigned
- Bartolomeu Leitão (6 February 1572 – 9 February 1587)
- Pedro Brandão, O. Carm. (8 August 1588 – 14 June 1608)
- Luís Pereira de Miranda (10 November 1608 – May 1610)
- Sebastião da Ascensão, O.P. (18 April 1611 – 18 March 1614)
- Manuel Afonso de Guerra (24 February 1616 – 8 March 1624)
- Lourenço Garro (18 August 1625 – 1 November 1646)
- Fabião dos Reis, O. Carm. (16 May 1672 – 8 February 1674)
- António de São Dionísio, O.F.M. (2 December 1675 – 13 September 1684)
- Vitoriano do Porto, O.F.M. (12 May 1687 – 21 January 1705)
- Francisco de Santo Agostinho, T.O.R. (24 September 1708 – 8 May 1719)
- José de Santa Maria de Jesus, O.F.M. (12 February 1721 – 7 June 1736)
- João de Faro, O.F.M. Ref. (3 September 1738 – 21 July 1741)
- João de Moreira, O.F.M. Ref. (26 November 1742 – 13 August 1747)
- Pedro Jacinto Valente, O. do Cristo (29 January 1753 – 19 January 1774)
- Francisco de São Simão, O.F.M. Ref. (1 March 1779 – 10 August 1783)
- Cristóvão de São Boaventura, O.F.M. Ref. (14 February 1785 – 29 April 1798)
- Silvestre de Maria Santíssima, O.F.M. Disc. (24 May 1802 – 22 November 1813)
- Jerónimo do Barco da Soledade, O.F.M. Ref. (21 February 1820 – 27 December 1831), resigned
- João Henriques Moniz (24 November 1845 – 1 July 1847)
- Patrício Xavier de Moura e Brito, O.S.A. (11 December 1848 – 15 April 1859), confirmed Bishop of Funchal
- João Crisóstomo de Amorim Pessoa, O.F.M. Ref. (23 March 1860 – 22 March 1861), confirmed Archbishop of Goa
- José Luís Alves Feijó, O.Ss.T. (25 September 1865 – 5 May 1871), confirmed Bishop of Bragança and Miranda
- José Dias Correia de Carvalho (26 June 1871 – 9 August 1883), confirmed Bishop of Viseu
- Joaquim Augusto de Barros (27 March 1884 – 1 March 1904)
- António Moutinho (14 November 1904 – 29 April 1909), appointed Bishop of Portalegre
- José Alves Martins (10 March 1910 – 15 November 1935), resigned
- Joaquim Rafael Maria da Assunção Pitinho, O.F.M. (15 November 1935 – 5 May 1940), resigned
- Faustino Moreira dos Santos, C.S.Sp. (28 January 1941 – 27 July 1955)
- José Filipe do Carmo Colaço (28 March 1956 – 21 April 1975), resigned
- Paulino do Livramento Évora, C.S.Sp. (21 April 1975 – 22 July 2009), retired
- Arlindo Gomes Furtado (22 July 2009 – 16 February 2026), retired
- Teodoro Mendes Tavares, C.S.Sp. (16 February 2026 – Present)

== See also ==
- Catholic Church in Cape Verde

== Sources ==
- Catholic Hierarchy
- Herbermann, Charles, ed. (1913). "São Thiago de Cabo Verde" . Catholic Encyclopedia. New York: Robert Appleton Company.
