= Catholic Church in Cape Verde =

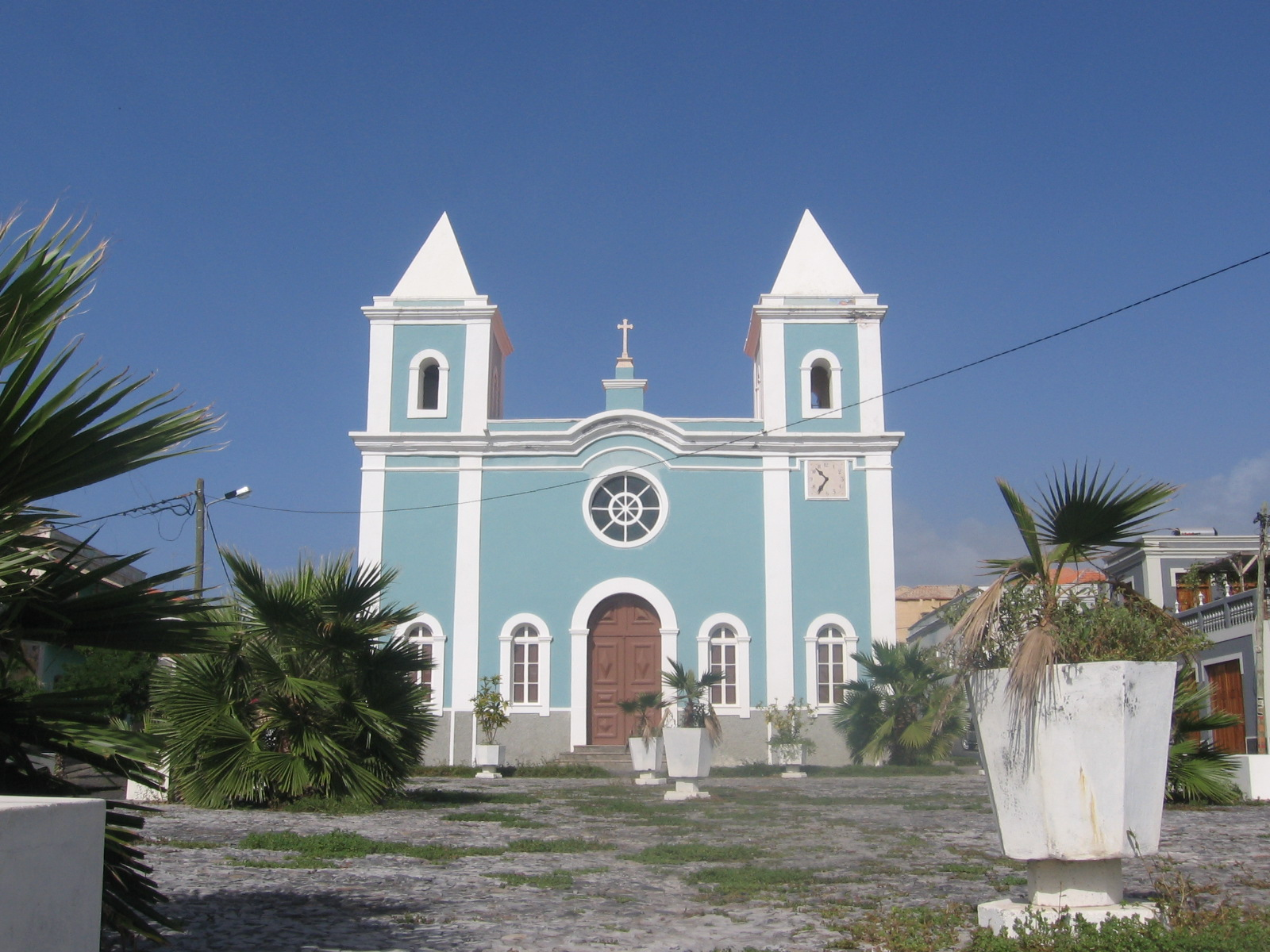
Church in São Filipe, Ilha do Fogo, Cape Verde

The Catholic Church in the Cape Verde is part of the worldwide Catholic Church, under the spiritual leadership of the Pope in Rome. The country is divided into two dioceses: Mindelo and Santiago de Cabo Verde.

In 2022, more than 94% of the population of Cape Verde is Christian, with almost 85% being Roman Catholic. Other figures state that 77% of the population is Catholic.

== History ==
The Catholic Church was established by Portuguese traders in 1533 on the island. Diplomatic relations between the Vatican and Cape Verde were established in 1976. The same year, Caritas Caboverdiana was founded as the social arm of the Church.

The Diocese of Mindelo was divided from the original Diocese of Santiago in 2003, creating the current configuration of two diocese covering the island country. In 2011, an agreement was signed between the Government of Cape Verde and the Vatican creating a legal foundation for the Catholic Church in the country, allowed for Catholic schools, and a church role in formalizing marriages. On February 14, 2015, Pope Francis made Bishop Arlindo Gomes the first Cardinal from Cape Verde.

== See also ==
- Religion in Cape Verde
- Christianity in Cape Verde
- Freedom of religion in Cape Verde
