= Aeroportos e Segurança Aérea =

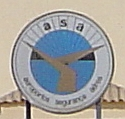
- Type: Sociedade Anónima
- Industry: Transport
- Founded: February 17, 1984; 42 years ago
- Headquarters: Espargos, Cape Verde
- Number of employees: 530 (2017)
- Website: www.asa.cv

Aeroportos e Segurança Aérea (Portuguese for "Airports and Air Safety", acronym: ASA) is the operator of airports of Cape Verde. Its headquarter is in Espargos on the island of Sal. It was founded as a state company on February 17, 1984, and was privatised to a Sociedade Anónima in 2001. With 530 employees (2017), it manages the four international (Sal, Praia, Boa Vista and Mindelo) and three domestic (São Filipe, São Nicolau and Maio) airports of Cape Verde. It also manages air traffic in the flight information region of Sal.

== See also ==
- List of airports in Cape Verde
