= Transport in Cape Verde =

Most transportation in Cape Verde is done by air. There are regular flights between the major islands (Santiago, Sal and São Vicente), with less frequent flights to the other islands. Boat transportation is available, though not widely used nor dependable. In the major cities, public bus transport runs periodically, and taxis are common. In smaller towns, there are mostly hiaces and/or taxis.

== Types of transport ==
Railways: 0 km - There are no railways in Cape Verde. There was a short overhead conveyor system for salt from the open salt lake on Sal to the port at Pedra de Lume, and a short rail track to the pier at Santa Maria for similar purposes. Both are now disused.

Roadways:
total: 10,000 km including unpaved tracks accessible only to four wheel drive vehicles
asphalt: 360 km
cobbled: 5,000 km (2007 estimates)

The majority of Cape Verdean roads are paved with cobblestones cut from local basalt. Recent international aid has allowed the asphalting of many roads including all of the highway between Praia and Tarrafal, all of the highway between Praia and Cidade Velha, and all of the highway between Praia, Pedra Badejo, and Calheta de São Miguel on Santiago, and the dual carriageway between Santa Maria and Espargos on Sal. A new ring road has been built from Praia International Airport around the city of Praia. The primary method of intercity and inter-village transport for Cape Verdeans is by aluguer shared taxis, commonly called Yasi, which is derived from the name HiAce, because the Toyota HiAce is the most common shared taxi model. Few Cape Verdeans own cars, but ownership is rising rapidly with increasing prosperity, particularly on Santiago Island.

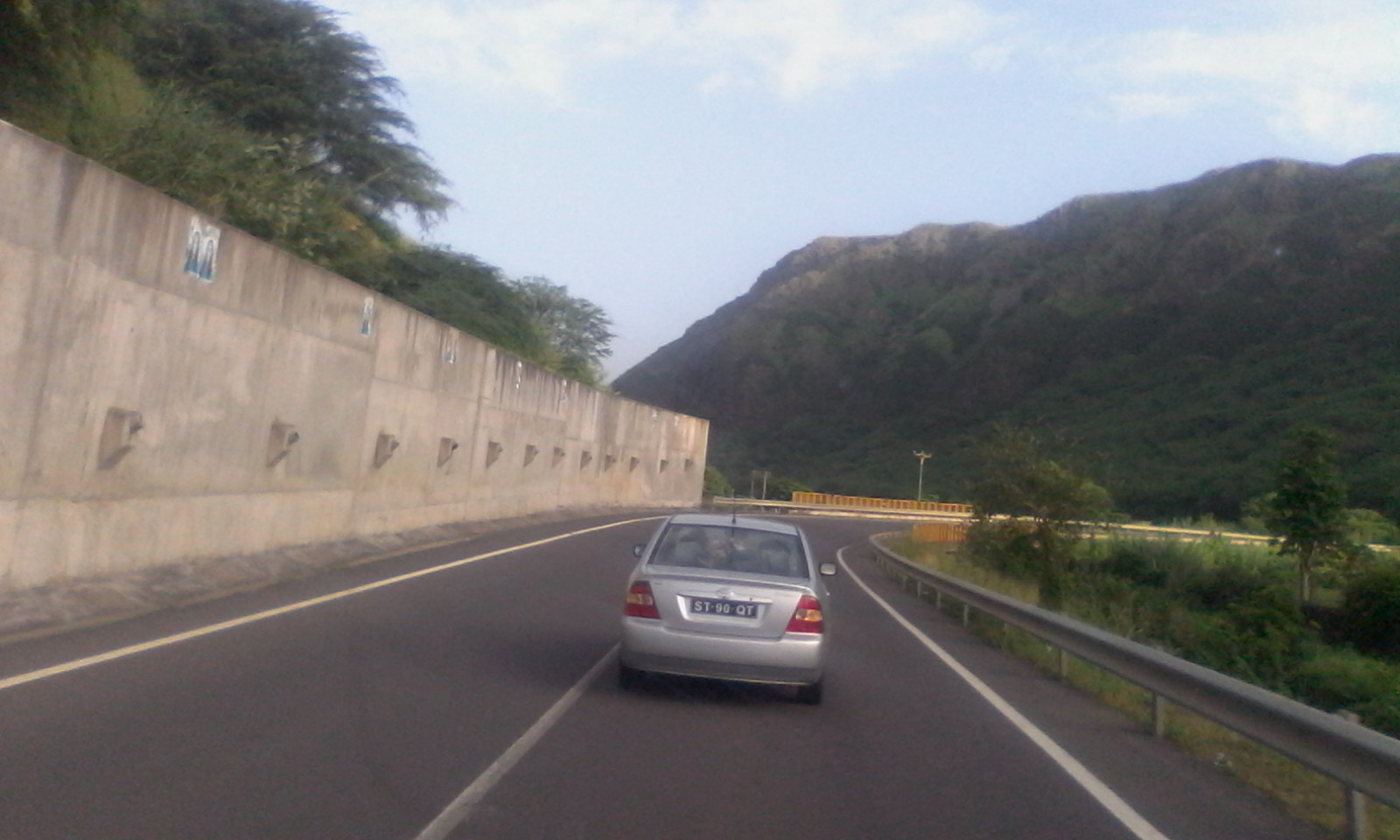
An alternative route in Sao Domingos, Cape Verde

Ports and harbours: Mindelo on São Vicente is the main port for cruise liners and the terminus for the ferry service to Santo Antão. A marina for yachts is undergoing enlargement (2007). Praia on Santiago is a main hub for ferry service to other islands. Palmeira on Sal supplies fuel for the main airport on the island, Amílcar Cabral International Airport, and is important for hotel construction on the island. Porto Novo on Santo Antão is the only source for imports and exports of produce from the island as well as passenger traffic since the closure of the airstrip at Ponta do Sol. There are smaller harbours, essentially single jetties at Tarrafal on São Nicolau, Sal Rei on Boa Vista, Vila do Maio (Porto Inglês) on Maio, São Filipe on Fogo and Furna on Brava. These are terminals for inter island ferry service carrying freight and passengers. There are small harbours, with protective breakwaters, used by fishing boats at Tarrafal on Santiago, Pedra de Lume on Sal and Ponta do Sol on Santo Antão. Some offer suitable protection for small yachts. The pier at Santa Maria on Sal used by both fishing and dive boats has been rehabilitated.

Merchant marine:
total: 10
ships by type: chemical tanker 1, trawler/cargo ship 5, passenger/cargo 5
foreign owned: 2 (Spain 1, UK 1) (2008)

Airports

- 7 operational in 2014 - 4 international and 3 domestic.
- 2 non-operational, one on Brava and the other on Santo Antão, closed for safety reasons.
- Over 3,047 m: 1
- 1,524 to 2,437 m: 3
- 914 to 1,400 m: 3

International Airports:

- Amílcar Cabral International Airport, Sal Island. Opened and began operating international flights from 1939. Named Sal International Airport until 1975.
- Nelson Mandela International Airport, Santiago Island. Opened and began operating international flights from 2005. Named Praia International Airport from 2005 until 2013. Replaced the Francisco Mendes International Airport which served the island from 1961 to 2005, and is now closed.
- Aristides Pereira International Airport, Boa Vista Island. Airport paved and began operating international traffic in 2007. Named Rabil Airport until 2011.
- Cesária Évora Airport, Sao Vicente Island. Opened in 1960 and became an international airport in 2009. Named Sao Pedro Airport until 2011.

International passenger traffic is forecast to exceed 250,000 passengers for 2007. Annual growth, mostly of tourists from Europe is anticipated to continue at just under 20%. (Source ASA Cape Verde airport authority)

Main Airlines serving the country:

- TACV Cabo Verde Airlines
- Cabo Verde Express Cape Verde Express
- Halcyonair Cabo Verde Airways - dissolved in 2013
- TAP Portugal

TACV flies daily international flights from Lisbon to Sal or Praia and once a week from Amsterdam, Munich, Paris, Las Palmas, Fortaleza and Boston to one or other of the international airports. It operates on a frequency varying from daily to thrice weekly on inter-island flights to each of the seven islands with operational airports and also to Dakar. It has a fleet of two Boeing 757s and three ATR42s have been replaced by ATR72s. It is currently (2010) undergoing privatization at the insistence of the World Bank.

== Road network ==
The road network of Cape Verde is managed by the national government (Instituto de Estradas) and by the municipalities. The total length of the road network is 1,650 km, of which 1,113 km national roads and 537 km municipal roads. Of the national roads, 36% is asphalted.

== Air services ==
TACV Cabo Verde Airlines, the national airline, flies weekly from Providence, Rhode Island to Praia International Airport at Praia Santiago island. Currently (2007) these flights are on Wednesdays, but schedules vary and are subject to change. It also has flights four times weekly from Lisbon to Francisco Mendes (the recently opened airport at Praia on Santiago island) and four times weekly from Lisbon to Amílcar Cabral International Airport on Sal island. There is a flight on Mondays from Paris-Charles de Gaulle Airport to Sal and on Thursdays from Amsterdam Schiphol Airport via Munich-Riem Airport to Sal. Return flights are just after midnight on the same day.

From Las Palmas in the Canary Islands, Spain there are night flights on Mondays and Thursdays, with departures just after midnight. Return flights are the previous day. There is a service from Praia to Fortaleza, Brazil on Mondays and Thursdays departing early evening and returning at night. All international flights are operated by Boeing 757 aircraft. Most international flights are subject to delay and sometimes cancellation.

TAP Air Portugal the Portuguese national carrier operates a daily service from Lisbon to Sal with late evening departures returning after midnight and reaching Lisbon in the early morning. Most flights are delayed and onward connections from Lisbon can be missed as a result. TAP and other European carriers provide connections with most European capitals, enabling same day through flights.

From the UK, direct routes by Astraeus from London Gatwick and Manchester to Sal ceased in April 2008; their website has not taken reservations since May 2008. TACV Cabo Verde Airlines opened a route from London Stansted in October 2008 though it was rumoured that flights were being cancelled due to minimum take up though with effect from May 2008, TACV have ceased flights from London Gatwick. There is a Fly TACV website, and you can book from their website. Reservations should be made via the UK TACV office on 0870 774 7338.

Thomson Airways have opened additional routes from London Gatwick and Manchester on Mondays and Fridays. Various options and bookings can be made via Thomsonfly to both Sal and Boa Vista.

Hamburg International provides a charter service from Hamburg via Düsseldorf on Thursdays and Condor operates from Frankfurt Rhein Main on Tuesdays returning on Wednesday.

Neos operates charter flights from Milan Malpensa, Rome-Fiumicino and Bologna on Wednesdays.

TACV Cabo Verde Airlines, the national airline has been a monopoly carrier within the island archipelago (2007). It operates services from the main hub airports at Sal and Santiago to Boa Vista, Fogo, Maio, São Nicolau and São Vicente at frequencies ranging from thrice weekly to thrice daily. Air strips on the other islands of Brava and Santo Antão are closed (2007) and can only be reached by ferry services from other islands.

TACV does not publish timetables; flight times are listed on departure boards. Tickets can be bought at the TACV shop at each airport by queuing and paying in cash (euros or escudos). Flights are often delayed and sometimes cancelled due to weather or operational conditions. Services are operated by ATR 42 turboprop aircraft, which are being replaced (2007) by the enlarged ATR 72 aircraft. Inter island tariffs vary depending on the distance but are generally around €180 return. Air passes are obtainable for multiple flights, when buying an international ticket on TACV.

Halcyonair a private carrier with Portuguese and Cape Verdean shareholders is commenced operations on inter-island flights during 2007. It has obtained the necessary licensing from the Cape Verde Government.

== Travel within the islands ==
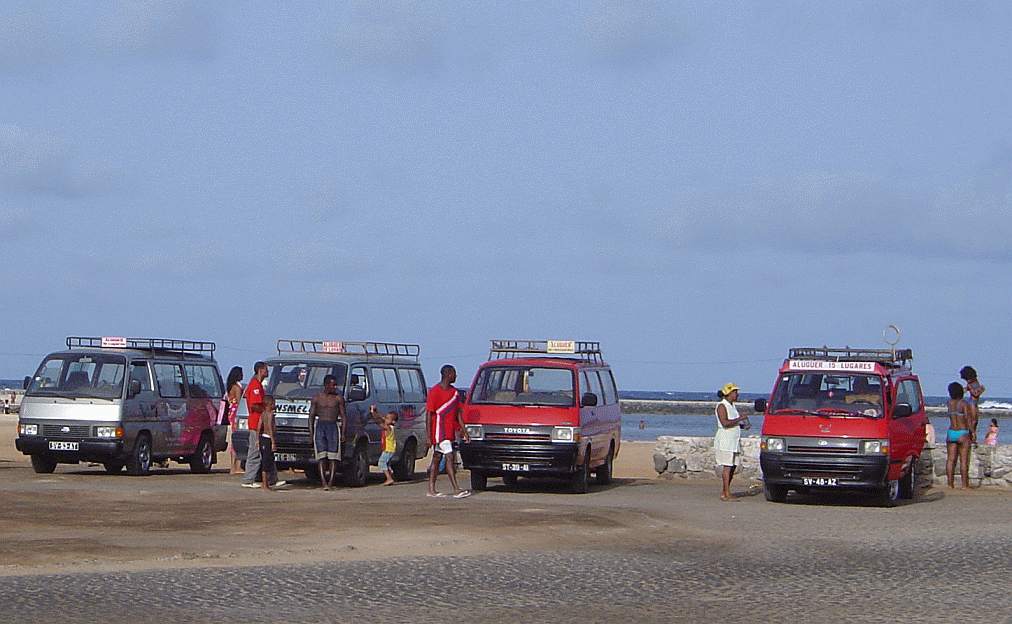
Minibuses (Aluguers) on a beach in Baía das Gatas

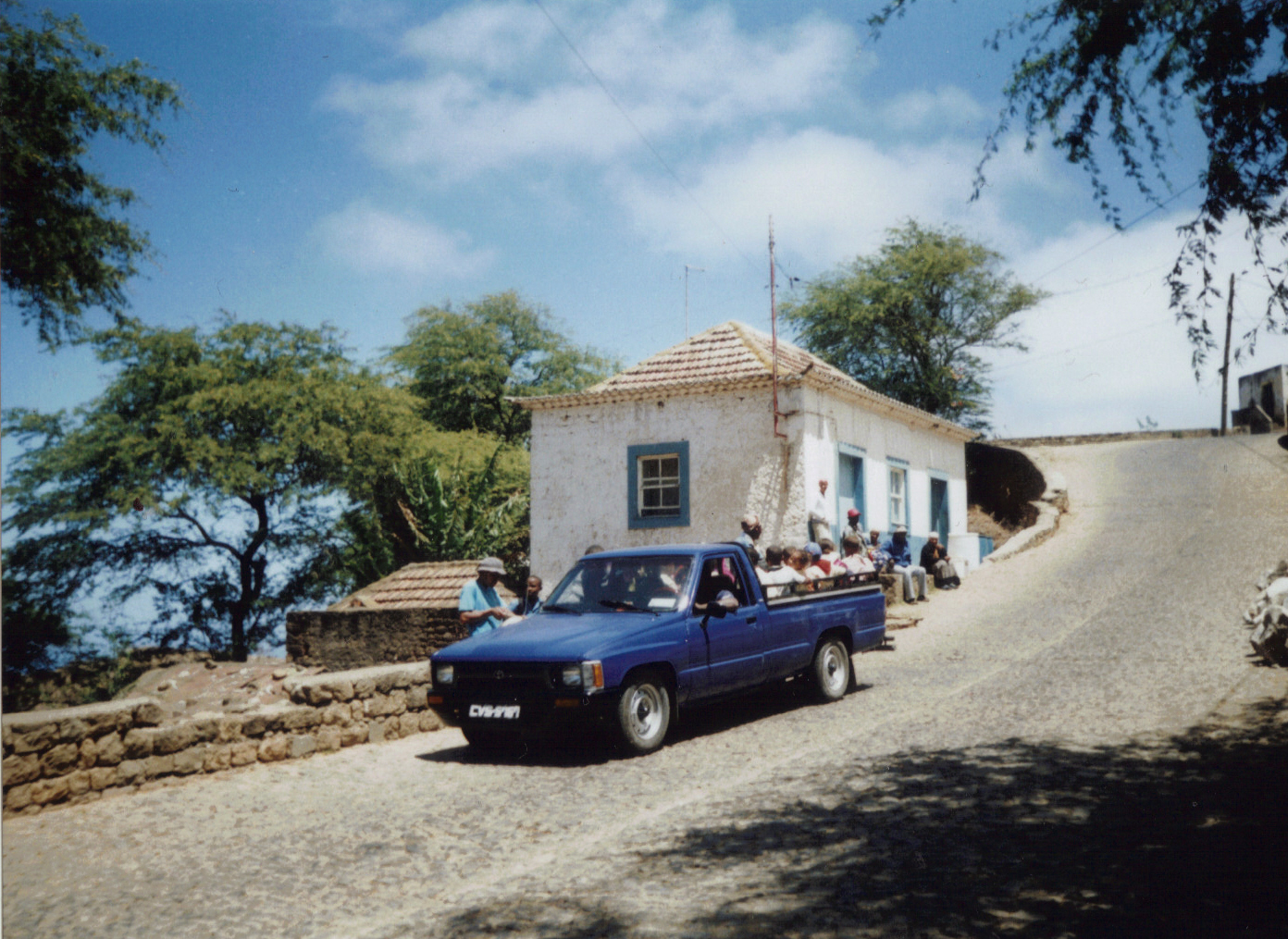
A minibus (aluguer) on the island of Brava

The frequency and regularity of publicly-accessible ground transportation services vary between the islands and municipalities. There are some common features that can be found throughout Cape Verde. The primary mode of transportation between municipalities is via shared minibuses commonly referred to as a "yasi", because of the Toyota HiAce which makeup the majority of the minibuses in service. While 12-14 passenger "yasi" class minibuses connect the major municipalities at their end points, modified pickup trucks with partially covered cabs and benches installed in the back transport passengers along shorter distances through minor municipalities and the rural areas in between. These modified pickup trucks are referred to as "hilux" after the Toyota Hilux, the common model adapted. Notably, both "yasi" and "hilux" transportation will stop and pickup any passenger that hails them, as well as drop off any passenger that requests to disembark at any point. intermuncipality transportation licenses are granted on an individual basis to each vehicle in the name of the owner by the Direcção Geral dos Transportes e Rodoviários (General Directorate of Transport and Roads). With the exception of the Praia ⇄ Assomada route on Santiago, all yasi and hilux class vehicles licensed to carry passengers act as individual freelancers, not collectively. As such, they do not adhere to scheduling, and have no obligation to provide service. This includes many vehicles running the same route, owned by the same person.

Brava

Hiluxes and yasis connect Furna and Nova Sintra mostly when boats arrive. Other parts of the island are connected by these vehicles.

Fogo

Fogo has many yasis running the routes between São Filipe and Mosteiros, São Filipe and Chã das Calderas. Unlike many other islands, these buses depart at roughly the same time every day, and despite the presence of multiple vehicles running each route, passengers can find themselves stranded if they do not board a vehicle during the limited departure window. Yasis tend to depart Mosteiros headed to São Filipe around 6am, and tend to Depart São Filipe headed to Chã around noon.

São Vicente

Mindelo has a municipal bus service run by the company Transcor. Yasi and hilux transportation connects Mindelo with other parts of the island. Other transportation companies especially minibuses include Transporte Morabeza, Transporte Alegría, Amizade, Sotral y Automindelo.

Santiago

Maura Company and Sol Atlántico are the only two companies that have been granted municipal bus service licenses. Over the past decade, Maura Company, which had previously been the dominant bus company, has retired the majority of its buses, while many that continue to run are in a state of disrepair due to financial difficulties. Sol Atlántico, in contrast, has greatly increased its fleet of buses, adding several new high capacity buses in 2015. Municipal bus prices are regulated at 44 escudos per ride. Transfers are not allowed. Bus schedules do not exist, but buses start running around 6am and stop around 9pm. Bus stops exist, and are frequently infiltrated by minibus vehicles (also called "yasis") and both (taxi) licensed and unlicensed "clan" taxis illegally running municipal bus routes without a municipal license. No other city on Santiago has a municipal bus service. The government of Assomada has solicited requests for a bus service but so far none has been approved, and there are no short-term plans for any bus company to enter the municipal market.

Transportation between the municipalities and rural areas is handled predominantly by yasi and hilux transportation. Rates are not fixed and range from 20 escudos for short trips between rural areas up to 500 escudos for Praia ⇄ Tarrafal. Some commonly accepted prices charged between municipalities are 100 escudos for Praia ⇄ São Domingos, 150 escudos for Praia ⇄ Orgãos, and 250 escudos for Praia ⇄ Assomada. Some of the yasis start collecting passengers before dawn to transport between Praia and Assomada and Praia and Pedra Badejo, and the last departures usually occur between 7 and 8pm. These vehicles do not maintain a schedule (with the exception of two early morning vehicles departing Assomada at 5:40 and 6:20 headed to Praia), instead choosing to drive around in circles within the urban centers of Praia, Assomada, and Pedra Badejo to pick up passengers until they are full, or over capacity (14 passengers is the legal limit for an actual Toyota HiAce), at which point they depart. Yasi drivers employ helpers to hawk out the window the destination of the yasi, as well as the obligatory "cheio", meaning full, with little regard for the number of people aboard. Helpers and drivers sometimes use shills (fake passengers) to overcome the common chicken and egg problem wherein passengers will not board an empty (or low passenger) minibus in an urban center because they know it will not depart until it is full. They will board a nearly-full (or over capacity) bus because they know it is likely to depart soon. In 2015 a project called EcobusCV started running a fleet of dual fuel waste vegetable oil / diesel modified Toyota HiACE minibuses using a scheduled service model between Praia and Assomada. Buses depart one per hour, on the hour, from designated bus stops in Praia, at Igreja Nova Apostólica in Fazenda, and Assomada, in front of the court house. The current departure schedule as of September 15 is one departure per hour, every hour starting at 7am, with the last departure at 6pm. EcobusCV plans to expand to departures in 30 minute intervals before the end of 2015. EcobusCV has instituted aggressive, transparent pricing undercutting the informal generally accepted prices between municipalities, which has started to cause freelance yasis to alter their pricing.

Taxis are common in Praia and Assomada. Taxis with a base in Praia are painted beige, while taxis with a base in Assomada are painted white. They can carry passengers between municipalities, but they are prohibited from circulating and picking up passengers outside of their base city, though they will usually pickup passengers if they get hailed on their way back to their home city. Taximeters are installed in most legal taxis, but many are not functional and they are almost never used because the generally accepted rates are cheaper than what the taximeter would usually count. In Praia there is a large number of "clan" or clandestine taxis that operate without paying for a license. Most people identify Toyota Corolla hatchbacks as clans and they are frequently hailed. While the minimum taximeter price is officially 80, in practice 100 is the minimum a person pays if they board a taxi. Taxi rates in Praia generally go up to 250 escudos from the furthest points of the city to Plateau, and cross town taxis cap out at 400 during the day. Rates generally go up by 50 escudos after 10pm, though for longer distances some will try to charge an extra 100. An exception to this rule is the airport. Airport rates generally range from 500 to 1000 depending on the starting place or destination, and can go up by several hundred at night.

Sal

Sal has unscheduled yasi service between Espargos and Santa Maria, with frequent departures in the morning from Espargos, where most locals live, to Santa Maria, where most locals work, and vice versa in the afternoon.

== Inter-Island ferries in Cape Verde ==
Several ferries operate between the islands with much lower fares than the airlines. These are provided by various independent shipping companies and their conditions and seaworthiness vary. Many services depart from Praia at about midnight, arriving in outlying islands at breakfast time. Return trips often depart around mid-day. Service schedules are approximate and delays or cancellations of service are common. Conditions can be very crowded it is advisable to pre-book a cabin for all but the shortest of trips. Passages can be very rough in winter.

Departure days vary according to the season and are frequently altered. Enquire at the shipping offices in Praia and other Cape Verdean ports.

In early 2011, the Kriola, the first of a proposed fleet of ferryboats belonging to the company Cabo Verde Fast Ferry (CVFF) arrived in Praia directly from Singapore. It was custom-built there by the Dutch shipbuilding company, Damen Group. The Kriola operates regular service among the Sotavento islands of Brava, Fogo, and Santiago.

=== Ferry routes ===
- Boa Vista (Sal Rei)–Maio (Cidade do Maio)
- Fogo (São Filipe-Vale de Cavaleiros)–Brava (Furna)
- Maio (Cidade do Maio)–Santiago (Porto Praia)
- Sal (Palmeira)–Boa Vista (Sal Rei)
- Santiago (Porto Praia)–Fogo (São Filipe-Vale de Cavaleiros)
- Santiago (Porto Praia)–São Vicente (Mindelo-Porto Grande) - longest ferry route
- Santiago (Porto Praia)–Brava (Furna)
- Santo Antāo (Porto Novo)–São Vicente (Mindelo-Porto Grande)
- São Nicolau (Tarrafal de São Nicolau)–Sal (Palmeira)
- São Nicolau (Preguiça)–Sal (Palmeira)
- São Vicente (Porto Grande)–São Nicolau (Tarrafal de São Nicolau)
- São Vicente (Porto Grande)–São Nicolau (Preguiça)

Lesser ferry routes:

  - Within Santo Antão: Tarrafal de Monte Trigo–Monte Trigo (45 min) - shortest ferry route
  - Within São Nicolau: Preguiça–Carriçal
