= Halcyonair =

Airline in Cape Verde

Halcyonair - Cabo Verde Airways
IATA	ICAO	Call sign
7Z	HCV	CREOLE
- Founded: February 25, 2005
- Ceased operations: 2013
- Hubs: Amílcar Cabral International Airport
- Fleet size: 1
- Destinations: 7
- Headquarters: Amílcar Cabral International Airport; Espargos, Cape Verde

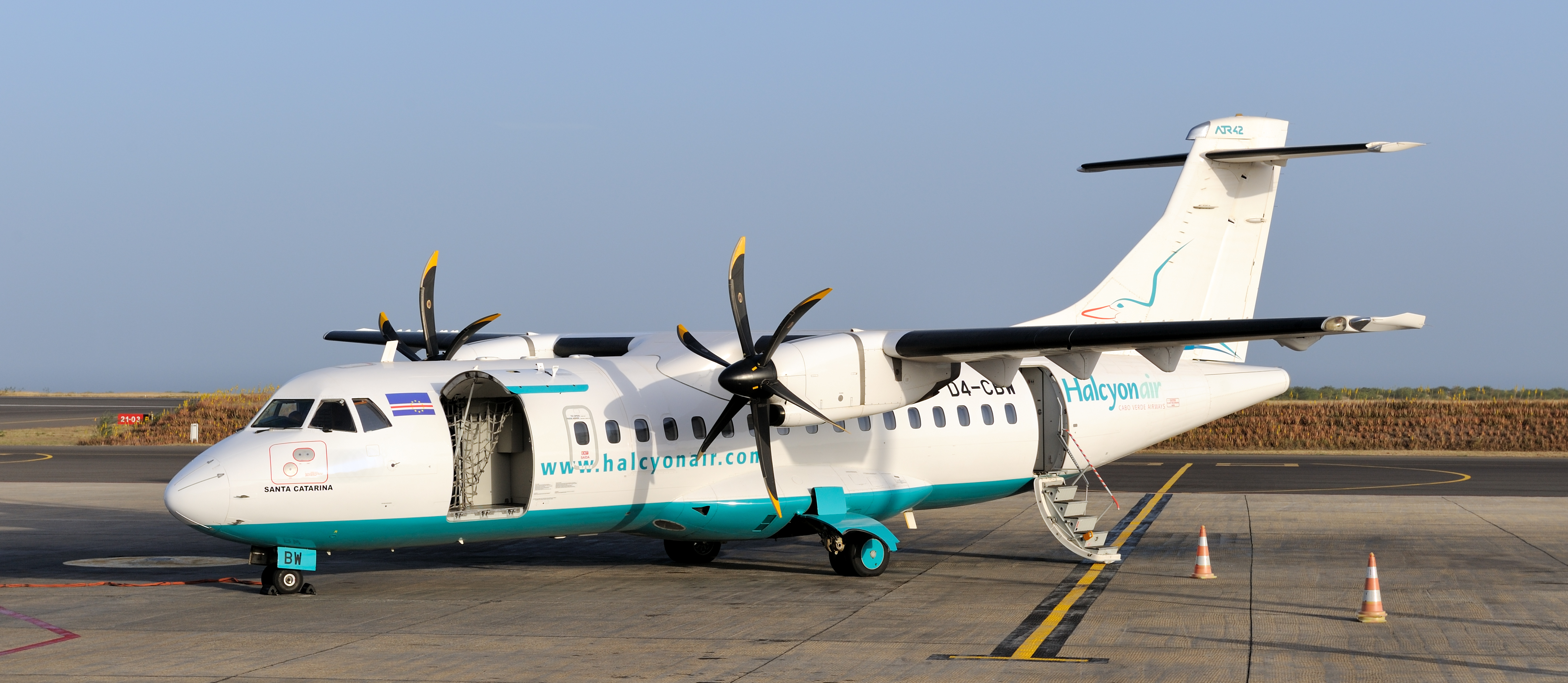
Halcyonair ATR 42-320 at Nelson Mandela International Airport, the location of the airline's head office

Halcyonair, S.A. was an airline with its head office in Amílcar Cabral International Airport in Espargos, Sal, Cape Verde. It was established in April 2005 and operated domestic flights between the Cape Verde Islands from its main base Amílcar Cabral International Airport.

== Destinations ==
- Cape Verde
  - Boa Vista - Rabil Airport
  - Maio - Maio Airport
  - Praia - Praia International Airport
  - Sal - Amílcar Cabral International Airport - hub
  - São Filipe - São Filipe Airport
  - São Nicolau - Preguiça Airport
  - São Vicente - São Pedro Airport

== Fleet ==
The Halcyonair fleet included the following aircraft (as of April 2021):

Cabo Verde Express fleet
Aircraft	Total	Passengers (Etoile/Economy)
ATR 42-320	1	48
ATR 42-500	1	48
