= HCN =

HCN may refer to:

== Science and mathematics ==
- HCN channel, a cellular ion channel
- Highly composite number, a type of integer
- Hydrogen cyanide, chemical with the formula HCN

== Transportation ==
- Halcyonair, a Cape Verdean airline
- Headcorn railway station, in England
- Hengchun Airport, in Taiwan

== Other ==
- Health Communication Network, an Australian software company
- High Country News, an American newspaper
