= HCV =

HCV may refer to:

== Government ==
- Housing choice voucher, US federal rent assistance
- Housing Commission of Victoria, Australia (1938–1984)

== Science ==
- Hepatitis C virus, a human pathogen
- Higher calorific value, see Heat of combustion
- High conservation value area, in ecology and forestry
- Housing choice voucher
- Housing Commission of Victoria, in Australia

== Other uses ==
- Halcyonair, a Cape Verdean airline (2005–2013; ICAO:HCV)
