= List of airports in Cape Verde =

This is a list of airports in Cape Verde, which have been historically an important infrastructural need for the economy and development of the country, since being an archipelago makes it impossible to have terrestrial links between the main cities and towns. As such, in addition to frequent maritime connections, every island except Brava and Santo Antão has a domestic airport.

Praia Airport, which was opened to international flights in September 2005, caters mainly to the Cape Verdian diaspora; Sal Airport, which previously handled all international flights, currently serves mainly the tourist industry of Sal Island. In late 2009 the São Pedro Airport on the island of São Vicente became an international airport.

== Airports ==
Island	City / town	ICAO	IATA	Airport name	Coordinates	Passengers (2017)
Boa Vista	Rabil	GVBA	BVC	Aristides Pereira International Airport	16°8′11″N 022°53′20″W	512,778
Fogo	São Filipe	GVSF	SFL	São Filipe Airport	14°53′7″N 024°28′49″W	72,949
Maio	Porto Inglês	GVMA	MMO	Maio Airport	15°9′22″N 023°12′49″W	15,100
Sal	Espargos	GVAC	SID	Amílcar Cabral International Airport	16°44′32″N 022°56′56″W	1,092,789
Santiago	Praia	GVNP	RAI	Nelson Mandela International Airport	14°56′29″N 023°29′5″W	662,356
São Nicolau	Preguiça	GVSN	SNE	São Nicolau Airport	16°35′18″N 024°17′3″W	27,038
São Vicente	São Pedro	GVSV	VXE	Cesária Évora Airport	16°50′0″N 025°3′20″W	266,221
Defunct airports
Brava	Brava	GVBR	BVR	Esperadinha Airport	14°51′52″N 024°44′46″W	
Fogo	Mosteiros	GVMT	MTI	Mosteiros Airport	15°2′42″N 024°20′24″W	
Santiago	Praia	GVFM	RAI	Francisco Mendes International Airport	14.924°N 023.494°W	
Santo Antão	Ponta do Sol	GVAN	NTO	Agostinho Neto Airport	17°12′11″N 025°5′27″W	

== See also ==
- Transport in Cape Verde
- List of airports by ICAO code: G#GV - Cape Verde
- Wikipedia: WikiProject Aviation/Airline destination lists: Africa#Cape Verde
