= Porto Airport =

International airport near Porto, Portugal

Francisco Sá Carneiro Airport Aeroporto Sá Carneiro

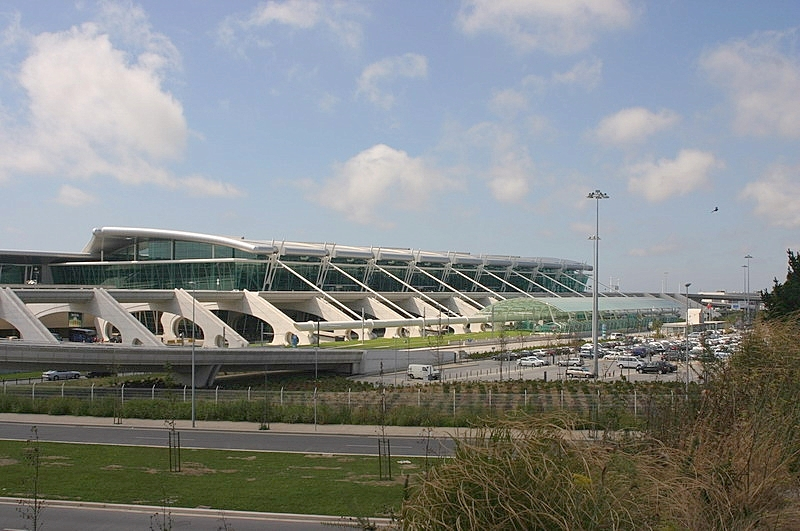
- IATA: OPO; ICAO: LPPR

Summary
- Airport type: Public
- Owner: Vinci Group
- Operator: ANA Aeroportos de Portugal
- Serves: Porto, Portugal
- Location: 11 km (6.8 mi) NW of Porto
- Opened: 1945
- Hub for: easyJet; Ryanair
- Focus city for: TAP Air Portugal; Transavia France; Air Horizont
- Elevation AMSL: 69 m (226 ft)
- Coordinates: 41°14′08″N 008°40′41″W
- Website: www.aeroportoporto.pt

Map
- Location in Portugal

Runways
Direction	Length		Surface
Direction	m	ft	Surface
17/35	3,480	11,417	Asphalt

Statistics (2025)
- Passengers: 16,939,000
- Passengers change 24-25: ▲6.3%
- Aircraft Movements: 109,620
- Movements change 24-25: ▲5.4%
- Sources: ANAC, , Vinci ANA Relatório Contas 2013

Francisco Sá Carneiro Airport (IATA: OPO, ICAO: LPPR) or simply Porto Airport (formerly Pedras Rubras Airport) is an international airport near Porto (Oporto), Portugal. It is located 11 km (6.8 mi) northwest of the Clérigos Tower (in the centre of Porto). Its location is split between the municipalities of Maia, Matosinhos and Vila do Conde. The airport is run by ANA – Aeroportos de Portugal and is currently the second-busiest in the country, based on aircraft operations; and the second-busiest in passengers, based on Aeroportos de Portugal traffic statistics, after Lisbon Airport and before Faro Airport. The airport is a base for easyJet, Ryanair, TAP Air Portugal and its subsidiary TAP Express.

== Location ==
The airport is surrounded by the municipalities of Matosinhos (to the south and west) and Vila do Conde (to the north) and Maia (to the east). It covers the parish of Perafita, Lavra e Santa Cruz do Bispo (in Matosinhos); Aveleda and Vilar do Pinheiro (Vila do Conde); and Vila Nova da Telha and Moreira (Maia). It includes an area of between 72 metres (236 ft) in the extreme south and 43 metres (141 ft) in the north. The southern portion of the airport intersects the hydrographic watershed of the Leça River, while the north is crossed by effluents of Onda River.

== History ==
The airport around Porto opened in 1945 and was initially known as Pedras Rubras Airport, after the name for the locality where the airport is located: Pedras Rubras ("red rocks"). It is still known by this name in the region. The land on which the airport was built was originally agricultural, characterised by rich soils that permitted the cultivation of various cereals.

It was renamed in 1990 after former Portuguese prime minister, Francisco de Sá Carneiro, who died in a plane crash when he was traveling to this airport on 4 December 1980.

Along with the airports in Lisbon, Faro, Ponta Delgada, Santa Maria, Horta, Flores, Madeira, and Porto Santo, the airport's concessions to provide support to civil aviation were conceded to ANA Aeroportos de Portugal on 18 December 1998, under provisions of decree 404/98. With this concession, ANA became responsible for the planning, development and construction of future infrastructure.

A new terminal building, designed by Portuguese firm ICQ, was built between 2003 and 2006, and became operational in the last quarter of 2006.

Porto Airport reached ten million passengers in a year for the first time on 6 December 2017.

== Airlines and destinations ==
=== Passenger ===
The following airlines operate regular scheduled direct passenger flights at Porto Airport:

Airlines	Destinations
Aegean Airlines	Athens
Air Canada	Seasonal: Montréal–Trudeau
Air Europa	Madrid
Air France	Paris–Charles de Gaulle
Air Horizont	Seasonal charter: Nador
Air Serbia	Seasonal: Belgrade
Air Transat	Toronto–Pearson; Seasonal: Montréal–Trudeau
airBaltic	Seasonal: Riga
American Airlines	Seasonal: Philadelphia (begins 29 March 2027)
Austrian Airlines	Seasonal: Vienna
Azores Airlines	Ponta Delgada, Terceira
Azul Brazilian Airlines	Campinas, Recife
British Airways	London–Gatwick
Brussels Airlines	Brussels
Bulgaria Air	Seasonal: Sofia
Cabo Verde Airlines	Seasonal: Sal
Chair Airlines	Seasonal: Zurich
Delta Air Lines	New York–JFK
easyJet	Basel/Mulhouse, Boa Vista, Bordeaux, Bristol, Funchal, Geneva, London–Gatwick, London–Luton, Luxembourg, Lyon, Marrakesh, Milan–Linate, Milan–Malpensa, Nantes, Nice, Paris–Orly, Prague, Praia, Sal, São Vicente, Zurich; Seasonal: Berlin, Glasgow, Ibiza, Manchester, Menorca, Naples, Palermo, Palma de Mallorca, Porto Santo, Split
Ethiopian Airlines	Addis Ababa
Eurowings	Cologne/Bonn, Düsseldorf; Seasonal: Berlin, Hamburg, Stuttgart
Iberia	Madrid
Iberojet	Seasonal charter: Cancún, Punta Cana, Varna
Jet2.com	Manchester; Seasonal: Birmingham, Newcastle upon Tyne
KLM	Amsterdam
LOT Polish Airlines	Warsaw–Chopin
Lufthansa	Frankfurt, Munich
Luxair	Luxembourg
Norwegian Air Shuttle	Seasonal: Billund, Copenhagen, Oslo, Stockholm–Arlanda
Nouvelair	Seasonal charter: Monastir
Privilege Style	Seasonal charter: Porto Santo
Royal Air Maroc	Casablanca
Ryanair	Alicante, Barcelona, Berlin, Birmingham, Bologna, Bristol, Brussels, Brussels-Charleroi, Budapest, Catania (begins 26 October 2026), Cologne/Bonn, Copenhagen, Dole, Dublin, Edinburgh, Eindhoven, Faro, Frankfurt-Hahn, Funchal, Gothenburg, Karlsruhe/Baden-Baden, Krakow, Lille, London–Stansted, Luxembourg, Madrid, Málaga, Malta, Manchester, Marrakesh, Marseille, Memmingen, Milan-Bergamo, Milan–Malpensa, Nîmes, Paris-Châlons-Vatry, Paris-Beauvais, Pisa, Rabat, Rome–Fiumicino, Seville, Stockholm–Arlanda, Tangier, Toulouse, Tours, Treviso, Turin, Valencia, Vienna, Warsaw–Chopin, Weeze, Wrocław; Seasonal: Agadir, Bari, Belfast–International, Cagliari, Carcassonne, Castellón, Gran Canaria, Ibiza, Klagenfurt (begins 30 March 2027), Leeds/Bradford, Liverpool, Nuremberg, Palma de Mallorca, Shannon, Tenerife–South, Trapani, Verona, Warsaw–Modlin
Scandinavian Airlines	Seasonal: Copenhagen
Smartwings	Prague; Seasonal charter: Boa Vista, Dakar–Diass, Porto Santo, Sal
Sundor	Seasonal: Tel Aviv
SunExpress	Seasonal: İzmir
Swiss International Air Lines	Geneva, Zurich
TAAG Angola Airlines	Seasonal: Luanda–Agostinho Neto
TAP Air Portugal	Boston, Funchal, Geneva, Lisbon, Luanda, London–Gatwick, Newark, Paris–Orly, Praia, Rio de Janeiro–Galeão, Sal (begins 25 October 2026), São Paulo–Guarulhos, Tel Aviv (begins 25 October 2026), Terceira, Zurich
Transavia	Amsterdam, Brussels (begins 14 December 2026), Nantes, Paris–Orly; Seasonal: Bordeaux, Brest, Lyon
Turkish Airlines	Istanbul
United Airlines	Newark
Volotea	Bilbao, Granada, Lyon, Nantes; Seasonal: Rodez, Strasbourg
Vueling	Barcelona, Bilbao, Paris–Orly; Seasonal: Ibiza
Wizz Air	Bucharest–Otopeni, Catania (begins 27 October 2026), Katowice, Milan-Malpensa, Rome–Fiumicino; Seasonal: Warsaw–Chopin
World2Fly	Seasonal charter: Punta Cana

=== Cargo ===
Airlines	Destinations
UPS Airlines	Cologne/Bonn

== Statistics ==
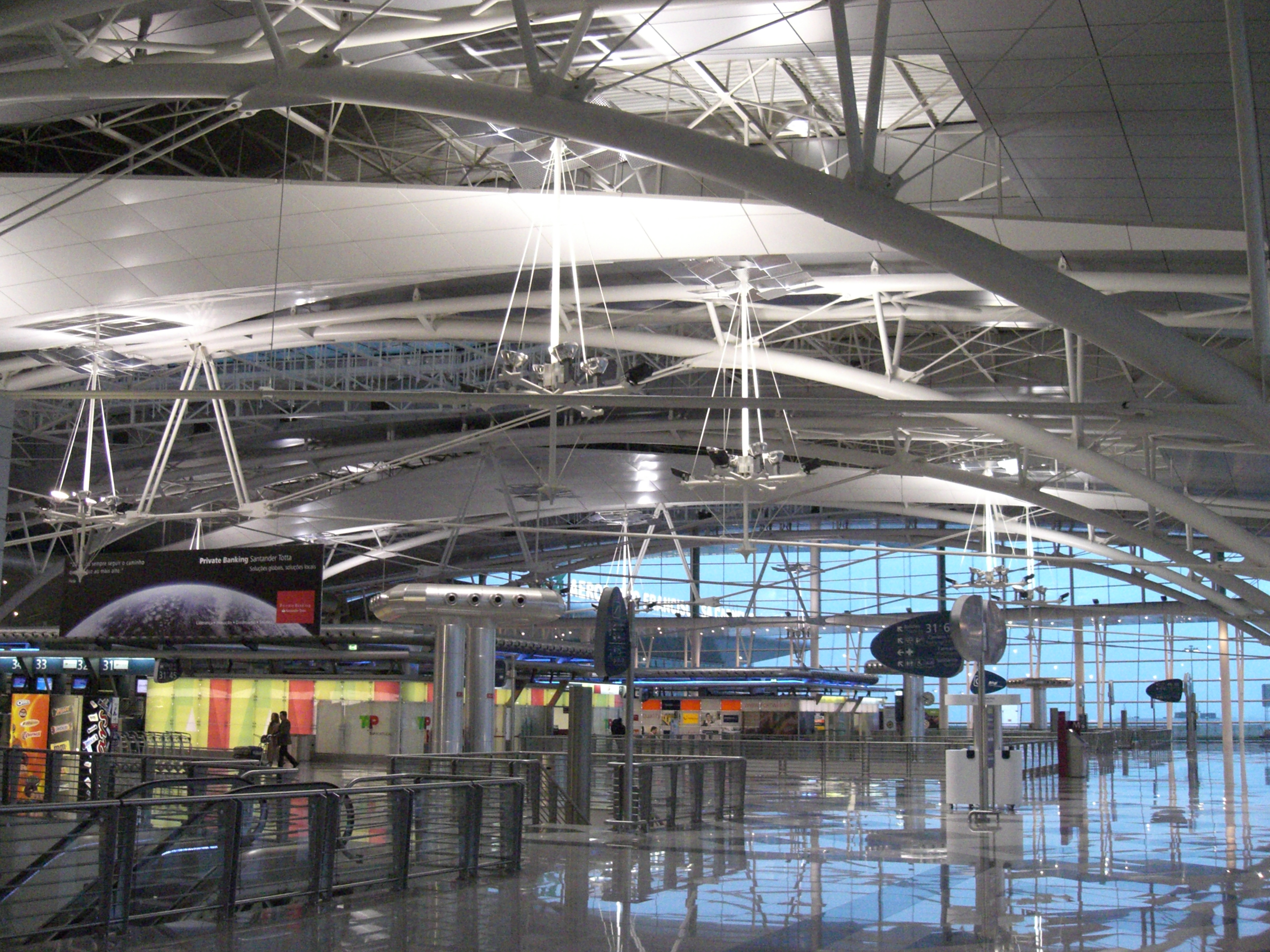
Airport terminal check-in hall.

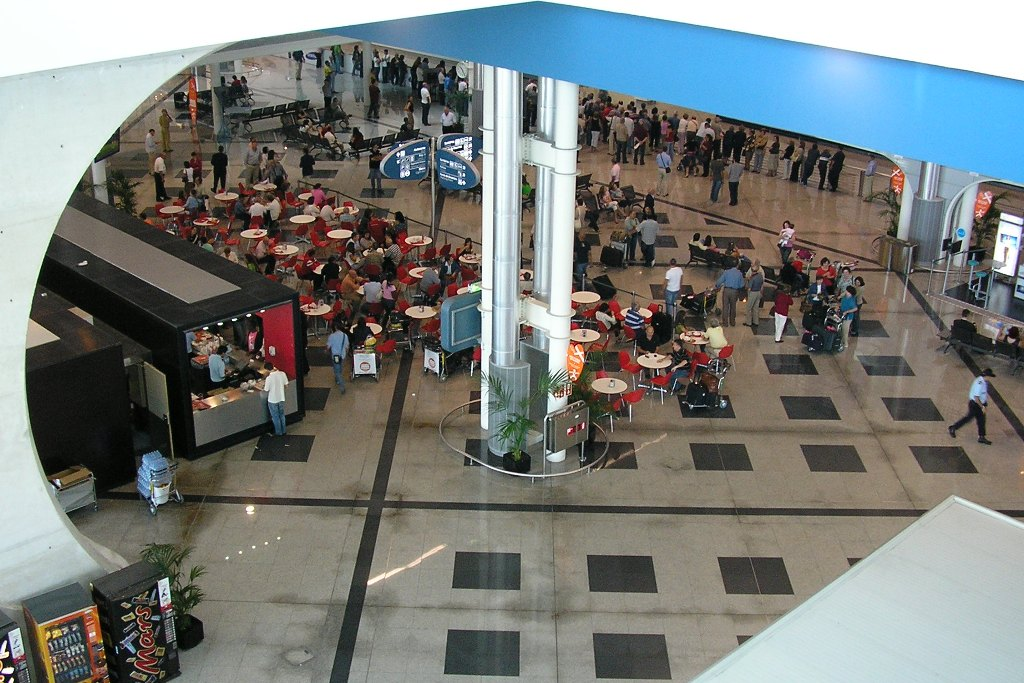
Airport terminal arrivals area

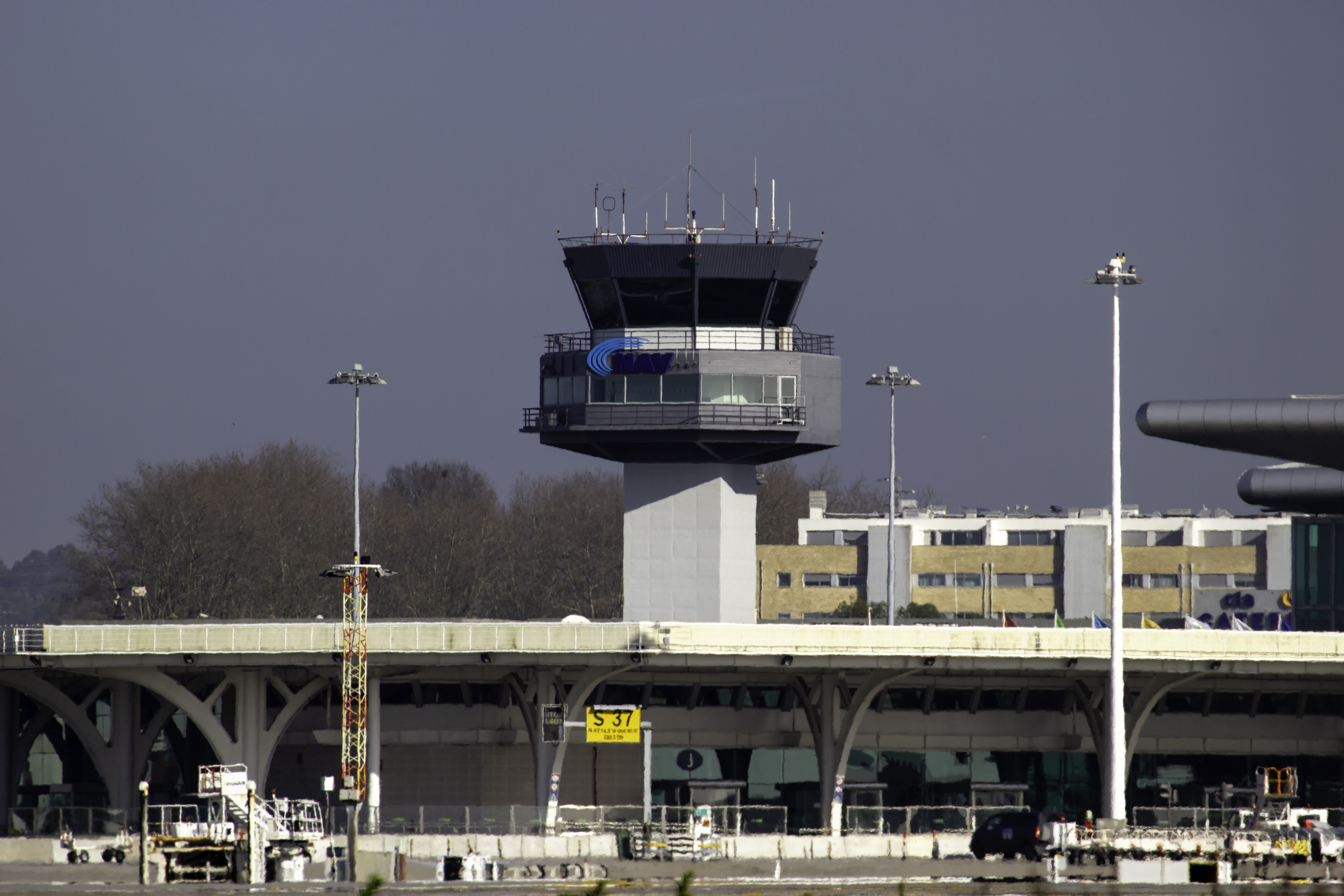
Control tower

=== Passenger numbers ===
	Passengers	% Change
2001	2,771,169	
2002	2,642,420	▼4.6%
2003	2,675,823	▲1.3%
2004	2,960,553	▲10.6%
2005	3,108,271	▲5.0%
2006	3,402,763	▲9.5%
2007	3,986,860	▲17.2%
2008	4,534,829	▲13.7%
2009	4,508,533	▼0.6%
2010	5,279,716	▲17.1%
2011	6,004,500	▲13.7%
2012	6,051,081	▲0.8%
2013	6,374,045	▲5.3%
2014	6,932,614	▲8.8%
2015	8,088,907	▲16.7%
2016	9,378,206	▲15.9%
2017	10,790,271	▲15.1%
2018	11,942,333	▲10.7%
2019	13,112,453	▲9.8%
2020	4,436,370	▼66.2%
2021	5,841,819	▲31.7%
2022	12,637,645	▲116.3%
2023	15,204,946	▲20.3%
2024	15,929,689	▲4.8%
2025	16,939,000	▲6.3%
Jan–Sep 2026	13,883,000	▲7.0%
Source: Pordata Vinci INE

=== Busiest routes ===
Top 10 busiest routes from Porto in 2024
Rank	Airport	Passengers	Airlines
1	Paris–Orly	1,139,251	TAP Air Portugal, Transavia, Vueling
2	Madrid	1,041,654	Air Europa, Iberia, Ryanair
3	Geneva	820,413	easyJet, Swiss International Air Lines
4	Lisbon	755,832	TAP Air Portugal
5	Barcelona	702,654	Ryanair, Vueling
6	Funchal	608,592	easyJet, TAP Air Portugal
7	Luxembourg	499,559	easyJet, Luxair, TAP Air Portugal
8	Zurich	461,908	easyJet, Swiss Air Lines, TAP Air Portugal
9	London–Gatwick	424,708	British Airways, easyJet, TAP Air Portugal
10	Amsterdam Schiphol	420,162	KLM, Transavia

== Ground transport ==
Besides taxi services and the road link, there are several public transportation links available:

=== Metro ===
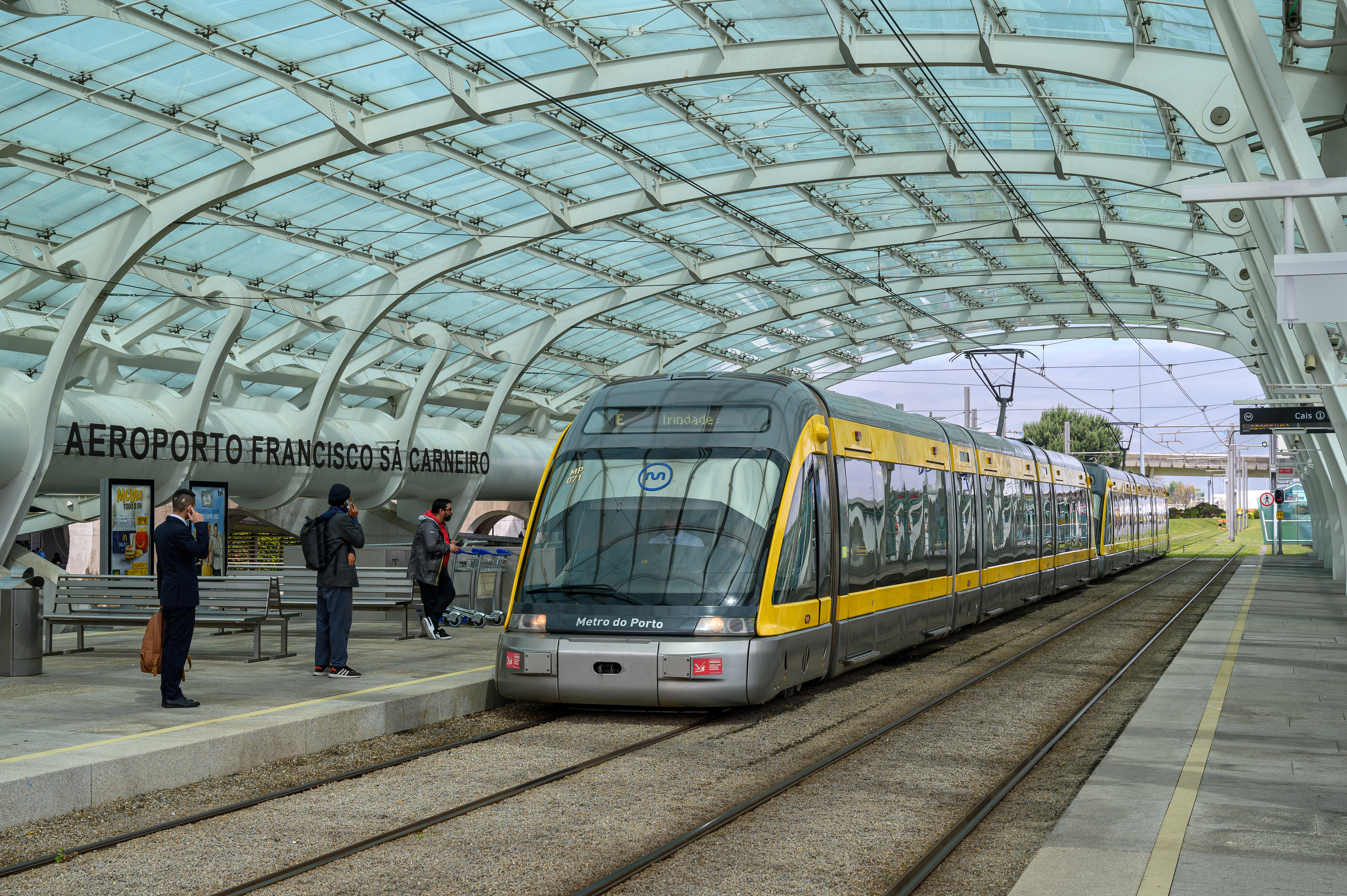
The airport's metro station

The airport is served by Aeroporto station, on line E of the Porto Metro. The station has three platforms and the trains leave the arrival platform and reverse into one of the departure platforms.

The service links the airport to Porto city center and by transfer in Trindade station to high-speed trains at Campanhã, and other urban centres of Greater Porto: in Verdes station to Vila do Conde and Póvoa de Varzim (using line B), Fonte do Cuco station to Maia (line C), Senhora da Hora station to Matosinhos (line A), and Trindade station to V.N.Gaia (line D) and to Rio Tinto/Fânzeres (line F).

=== Car ===
Sá Carneiro airport is accessible via the A41 and A28 motorways, but also the EN13 highway (using the EN107 accessway). These roadways lead to drop-off and pick-up areas and short and long-stay car parks. It can also be reached by the A4 motorway through the VRI accessway.

=== Bus ===
STCP buses also link the airport and the city. There is also a bus that operates all night from Porto city centre to the airport. There is also bus service to/from Vigo (Galicia/Spain) twice a day on weekdays, and once a day during the weekend.

=== Shuttle ===
The GetBUS shuttle provides 50-minute direct connections to the towns of Braga and Guimarães.

=== Further proposals ===
As of 2020, the proposed Porto–Vigo high-speed rail line would be built via the airport.

== Accidents and incidents ==
- On 27 April 2021, a FedEx cargo jet was cleared for takeoff while a ground vehicle was on the runway, coming within four seconds of collision before taking off over it. The Office for the Prevention and Investigation of Accidents in Civil Aviation and Rail rated the incursion a "serious incident" and initiated a safety investigation. On 29 December 2022, the final report into the incident was published.

== See also ==
- Transport in Portugal
- List of airports in Portugal
