= Edelweiss Air =

Leisure airline of Switzerland

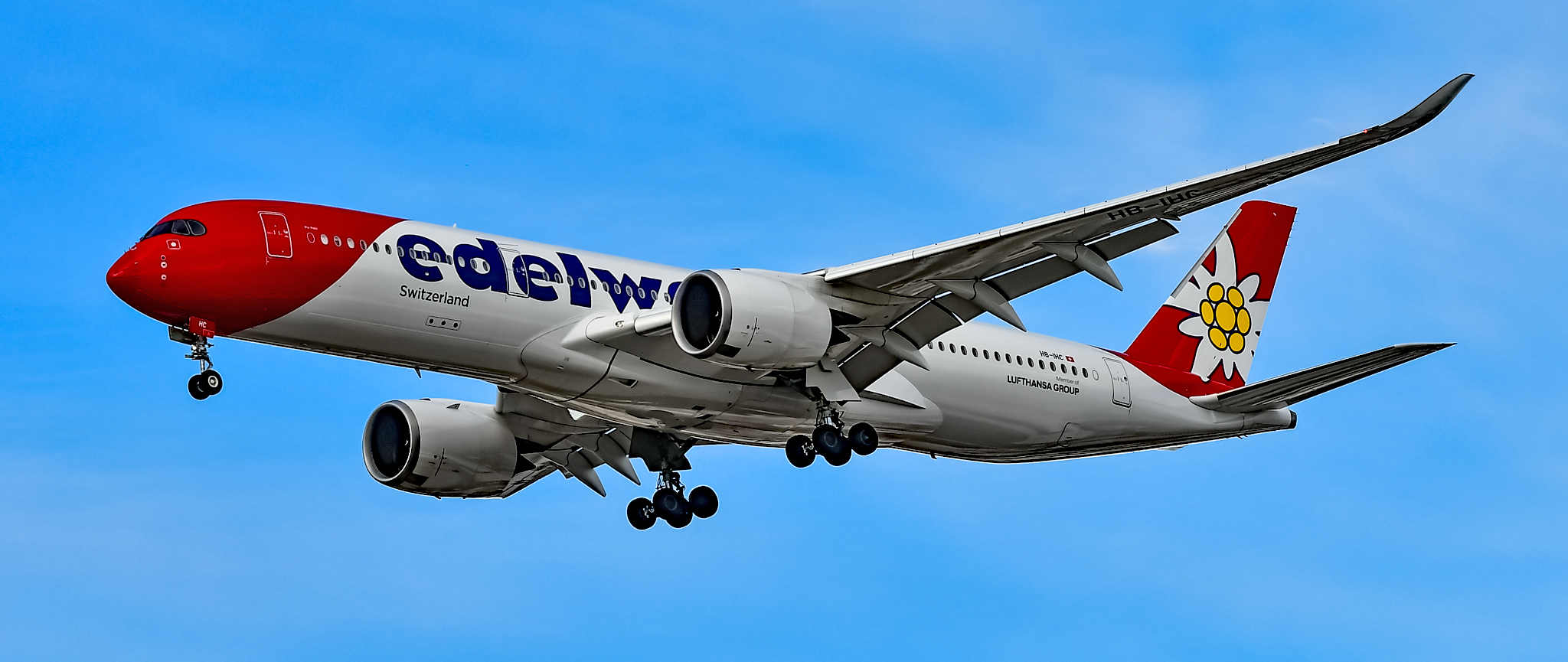
- An Edelweiss Air Airbus A350-900
IATA	ICAO	Call sign
WK	EDW	EDELWEISS
- Founded: 19 October 1995; 31 years ago
- AOC #: CH.AOC.1007
- Operating bases: Zurich Airport
- Fleet size: 22
- Destinations: 65
- Parent company: Swiss International Air Lines
- Headquarters: Kloten, Zurich, Switzerland
- Key people: Bernd Bauer (CEO)
- Founder: Nick Grob
- Employees: 1217 (December 2024)
- Website: www.flyedelweiss.com

Edelweiss Air AG is a Swiss leisure airline and the sister company of Swiss International Air Lines and a subsidiary of the Lufthansa Group. It operates flights to European and intercontinental destinations from its base at Zurich Airport.

== History ==
=== Early years ===
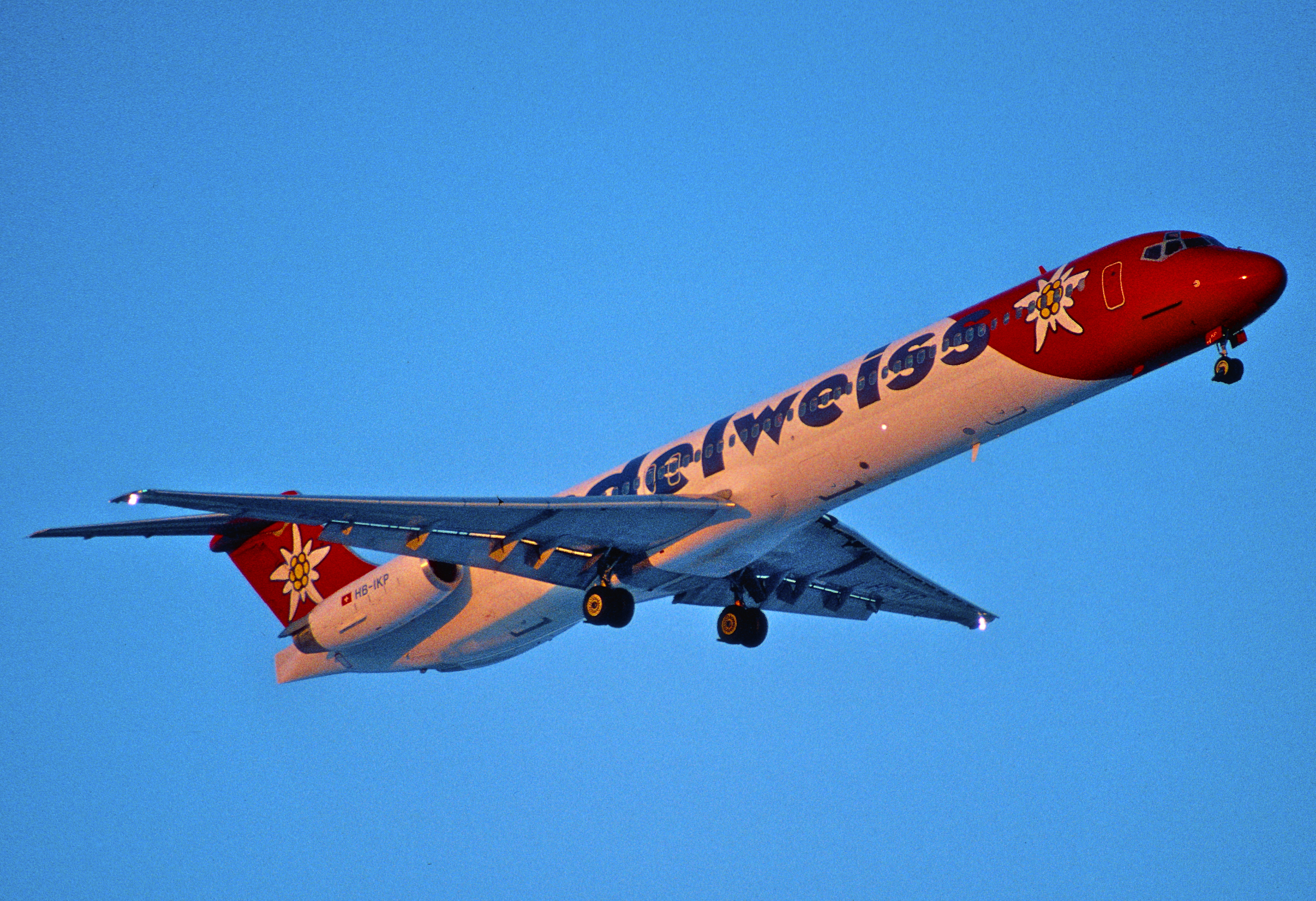
A former Edelweiss Air McDonnell Douglas MD-83 in 1997

The airline was founded on 19 October 1995 in Bassersdorf, Switzerland, with just one aircraft, a McDonnell Douglas MD-83. The company's name is derived from the Swiss unofficial national flower, the Edelweiss, which is also painted on its aircraft.

The fleet was subsequently expanded and renewed. In 1998, new Airbus A320-200 aircraft were introduced to replace the MD-83s, and in 1999, long-haul flights were commenced using the Airbus A330-200.

For seven consecutive years between 2001 and 2008, Edelweiss Air received the golden Travelstar Award for its achievements.

Until November 2008, Edelweiss Air was wholly owned by Kuoni Travel and had 190 employees, when the operating rights were sold to Swiss International Air Lines, in exchange for sale rights of hotel capacities via the Swiss sales network. Following Swiss International Air Lines being acquired by the German Lufthansa Group in 2005, Edelweiss Air also became a subsidiary of Europe's largest airline group at the same time it was acquired by Swiss.

=== Developments since 2010 ===
In March 2011, Edelweiss Air added the larger Airbus A330-300 to its fleet, with an order having been placed on 5 April 2010. In July 2015, it was announced that Edelweiss would receive four Airbus A340-300s between 2017 and 2018, previously operated by its parent Swiss International Air Lines. The aircraft were used to expand the route network.

In November 2015, Edelweiss introduced a revised livery on one of its Airbus A320-200 aircraft, which was subsequently applied to the rest of the airline's fleet. In December 2016, Edelweiss Air phased out its sole Airbus A330-200, which was transferred to Brussels Airlines and replaced by Airbus A340-300s inherited from parent Swiss. In 2021, Lufthansa moved Edelweiss Air's two Airbus A330-300s to Eurowings Discover.

On 6 January 2025, Edelweiss Air, through a media release announced that the airline will discontinue flights to Havana, Cuba due to declining demand of passengers and the unexpected current conditions at Jose Marti International Airport. The last flight from Zurich to Havana and back to the Swiss city was on 27 February 2025.

== Destinations ==
As of October 2026, Edelweiss Air flies (or has flown) to the following destinations:

Country	City	Airport	Notes	Refs
Argentina	Buenos Aires	Ministro Pistarini International Airport	Terminated	
Brazil	Rio de Janeiro	Rio de Janeiro/Galeão International Airport	Terminated	
Brazil	Salvador	Salvador Bahia Airport	Terminated	
Bulgaria	Varna	Varna Airport	Seasonal	
Canada	Calgary	Calgary International Airport	Seasonal	
Canada	Halifax	Halifax Stanfield International Airport	Seasonal	
Canada	Vancouver	Vancouver International Airport	Seasonal	
Canada	Whitehorse	Erik Nielsen Whitehorse International Airport	Terminated	
Cape Verde	Boa Vista	Aristides Pereira International Airport	Seasonal	
Cape Verde	Praia	Nelson Mandela International Airport		
Cape Verde	Sal	Amílcar Cabral International Airport	Seasonal	
Cape Verde	São Vicente	Cesária Évora Airport		
Colombia	Bogotá	El Dorado International Airport	Seasonal	
Colombia	Cartagena	Rafael Núñez International Airport	Seasonal	
Costa Rica	Liberia	Guanacaste Airport		
Costa Rica	San José	Juan Santamaría International Airport		
Croatia	Pula	Pula Airport	Seasonal	
Croatia	Split	Split Airport	Seasonal	
Croatia	Zadar	Zadar Airport		
Cuba	Havana	José Martí International Airport ^{Seasonal}	Terminated	
Cuba	Varadero	Juan Gualberto Gómez Airport	Terminated	
Cyprus	Larnaca	Larnaca International Airport		
Cyprus	Paphos	Paphos International Airport	Terminated	
Dominican Republic	Punta Cana	Punta Cana International Airport		
Dominican Republic	Puerto Plata	Gregorio Luperón International Airport	Seasonal	
Egypt	Giza	Sphinx International Airport		
Egypt	Hurghada	Hurghada International Airport		
Egypt	Luxor	Luxor International Airport	Seasonal	
Egypt	Marsa Alam	Marsa Alam International Airport		
Egypt	Sharm El Sheikh	Sharm El Sheikh International Airport		
Finland	Ivalo	Ivalo Airport	Seasonal	
Finland	Kittilä	Kittilä Airport	Seasonal	
Finland	Kuusamo	Kuusamo Airport	Seasonal	
Finland	Rovaniemi	Rovaniemi Airport	Seasonal	
France	Biarritz	Biarritz Pays Basque Airport		
France	Figari	Figari–Sud Corse Airport	Seasonal	
Georgia	Tbilisi	Tbilisi International Airport		
Greece	Araxos	Patras Araxos Airport	Seasonal	
Greece	Corfu	Corfu International Airport	Seasonal	
Greece	Chania	Chania International Airport	Seasonal	
Greece	Heraklion	Heraklion International Airport	Seasonal	
Greece	Kalamata	Kalamata International Airport	Seasonal	
Greece	Kos	Kos International Airport	Seasonal	
Greece	Mykonos	Mykonos Airport	Seasonal	
Greece	Rhodes	Rhodes International Airport	Seasonal	
Greece	Samos	Samos International Airport	Seasonal	
Greece	Santorini	Santorini International Airport	Seasonal	
Greece	Zakynthos	Zakynthos International Airport	Seasonal	
Iceland	Akureyri	Akureyri Airport	Seasonal	
Iceland	Reykjavík	Keflavík International Airport	Seasonal	
Ireland	Cork	Cork Airport	Seasonal	
Italy	Cagliari	Cagliari Elmas Airport	Seasonal	
Italy	Catania	Catania–Fontanarossa Airport		
Italy	Lamezia Terme	Lamezia Terme International Airport		
Italy	Pisa	Pisa International Airport	Seasonal	
Italy	Olbia	Olbia Costa Smeralda Airport	Seasonal	
Jamaica	Montego Bay	Sangster International Airport	Seasonal	
Jordan	Amman	Queen Alia International Airport		
Jordan	Aqaba	King Hussein International Airport		
Kosovo	Pristina	Pristina International Airport		
Maldives	Malé	Velana International Airport	Seasonal	
Mauritius	Port Louis	Sir Seewoosagur Ramgoolam International Airport		
Mexico	Cancún	Cancún International Airport		
Morocco	Agadir	Agadir–Al Massira Airport	Seasonal	
Morocco	Marrakesh	Marrakesh Menara Airport	Seasonal	
Namibia	Windhoek	Hosea Kutako International Airport	Seasonal	
North Macedonia	Ohrid	Ohrid St. Paul the Apostle Airport	Seasonal	
North Macedonia	Skopje	Skopje International Airport		
Norway	Bergen	Bergen Airport		
Norway	Tromsø	Tromsø Airport	Seasonal	
Oman	Muscat	Muscat International Airport	Seasonal	
Oman	Salalah	Salalah International Airport		
Portugal	Faro	Faro Airport		
Portugal	Funchal	Madeira Airport		
Portugal	Ponta Delgada	João Paulo II Airport	Seasonal	
Seychelles	Mahé	Seychelles International Airport	Seasonal	
South Africa	Cape Town	Cape Town International Airport	Seasonal	
Spain	Arrecife	Lanzarote Airport	Seasonal	
Spain	Fuerteventura	Fuerteventura Airport		
Spain	Jerez de la Frontera	Jerez Airport	Seasonal	
Spain	Ibiza	Ibiza Airport	Seasonal	
Spain	Gran Canaria	Gran Canaria Airport		
Spain	La Palma	La Palma Airport	Seasonal	
Spain	Menorca	Menorca Airport	Seasonal	
Spain	Palma de Mallorca	Palma de Mallorca Airport		
Spain	Santiago de Compostela	Santiago–Rosalía de Castro Airport	Seasonal	
Spain	Seville	Seville Airport	Seasonal	
Spain	Tenerife	Tenerife South Airport		
Sri Lanka	Colombo	Bandaranaike International Airport	Seasonal	
Sweden	Luleå	Luleå Airport		
Switzerland	Zurich	Zurich Airport	Hub	
Tanzania	Kilimanjaro	Kilimanjaro International Airport		
Tanzania	Zanzibar	Abeid Amani Karume International Airport		
Thailand	Phuket	Phuket International Airport	Seasonal	
Tunisia	Djerba	Djerba–Zarzis International Airport	Seasonal	
Tunisia	Tunis	Tunis–Carthage International Airport	Seasonal	
Turkey	Antalya	Antalya Airport	Seasonal	
Turkey	Bodrum	Milas–Bodrum Airport	Seasonal	
Turkey	Dalaman	Dalaman Airport	Seasonal	
United Kingdom	Bristol	Bristol Airport		
United Kingdom	Edinburgh	Edinburgh Airport		
United Kingdom	Glasgow	Glasgow Airport	Seasonal	
United Kingdom	Inverness	Inverness Airport	Terminated	
United Kingdom	Newquay	Newquay Airport	Seasonal	
United States	Anchorage	Ted Stevens Anchorage International Airport	Terminated	
United States	Denver	Denver International Airport	Terminated	
United States	Las Vegas	Harry Reid International Airport	Terminated	
United States	San Diego	San Diego International Airport	Terminated	
United States	Orlando	Orlando International Airport	Terminated	
United States	Seattle	Seattle–Tacoma International Airport	Terminated	
United States	Tampa	Tampa International Airport		
Vietnam	Ho Chi Minh City	Tan Son Nhat International Airport	Terminated	

=== Codeshare agreements ===
- Air Canada
- Lufthansa
- Swiss International Air Lines

== Fleet ==
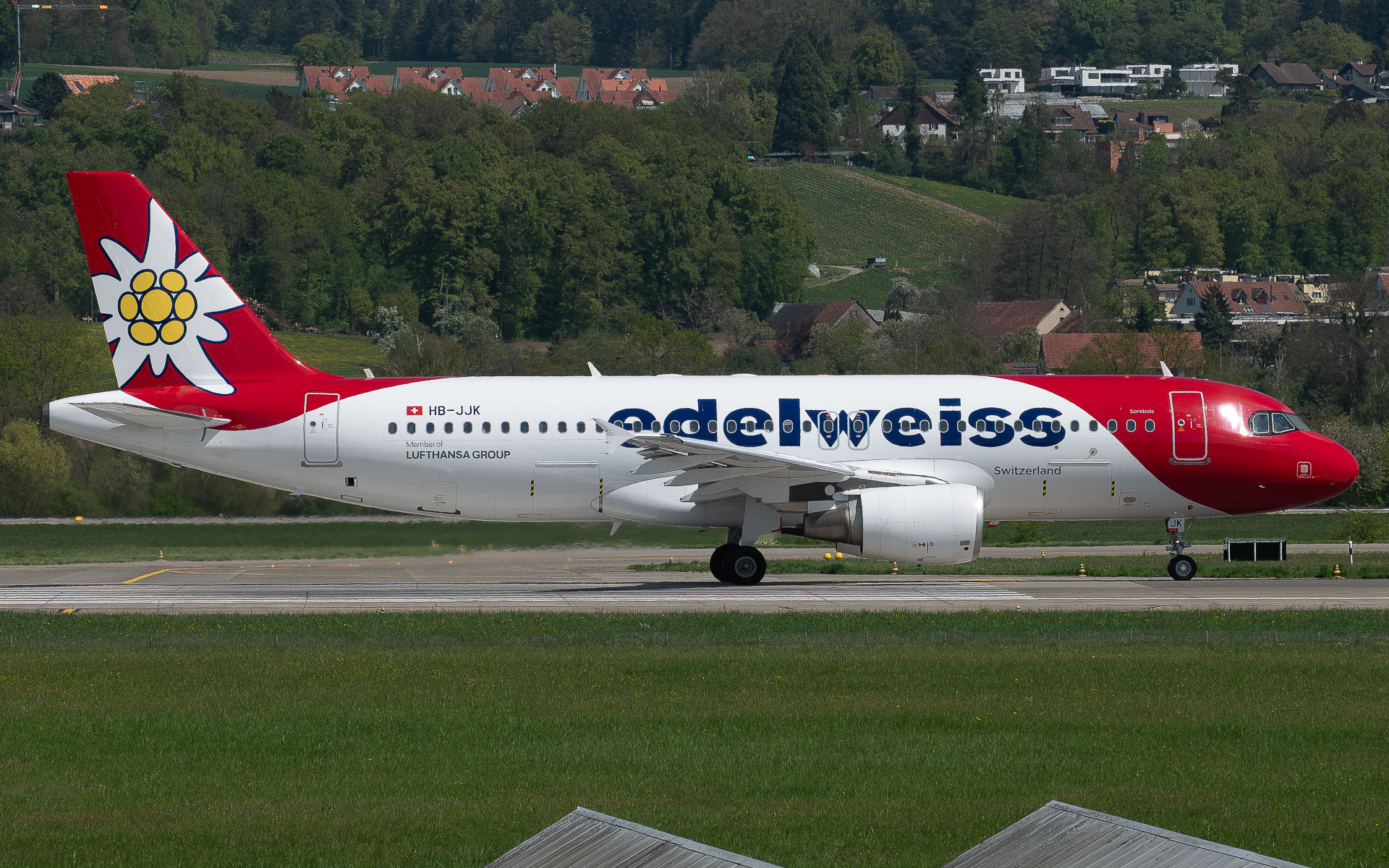
Edelweiss Airbus A320-200 in the updated livery (HB-JJK)

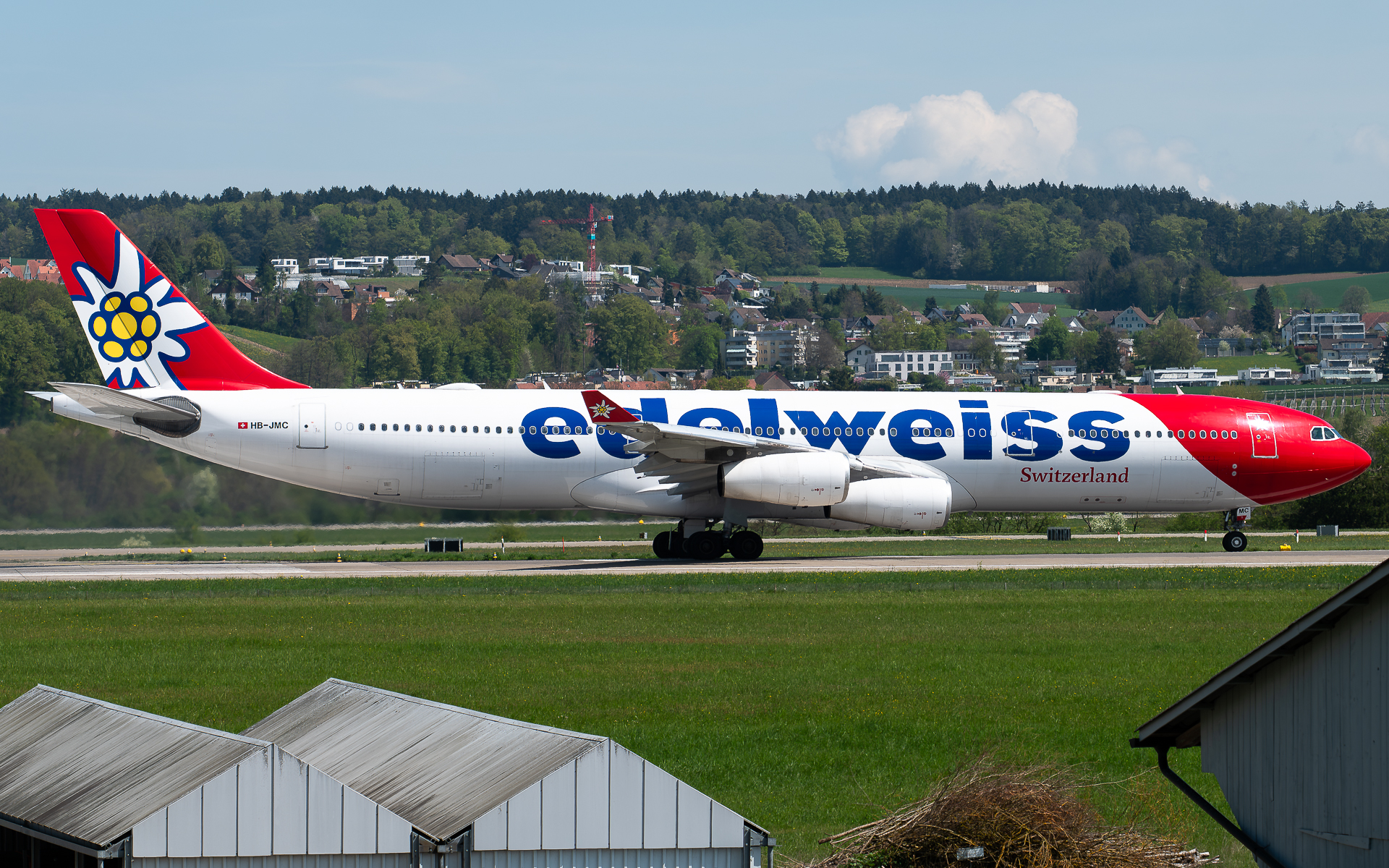
Edelweiss Air A340-300 (HB-JMC) departing Zurich in the airline's previous livery

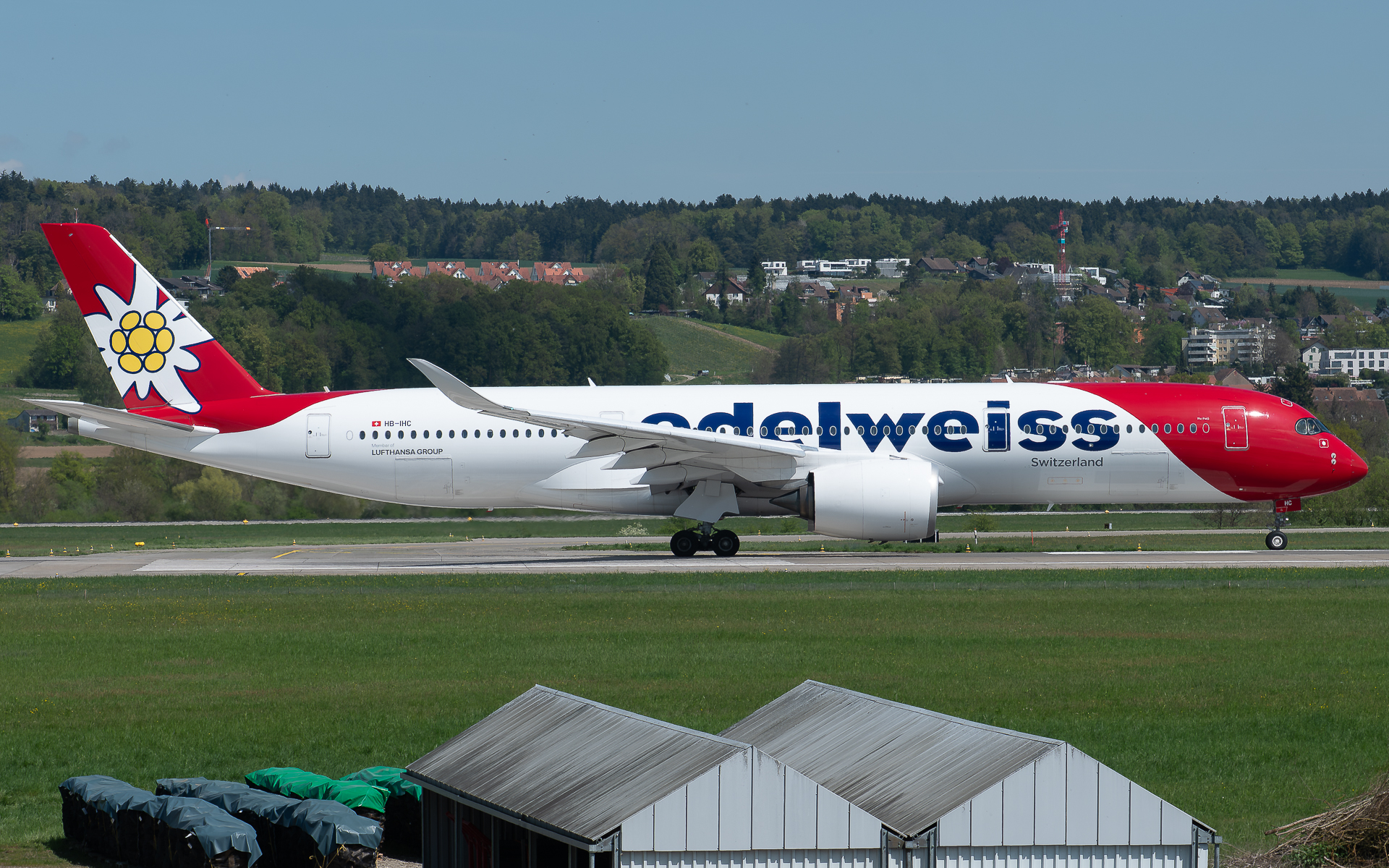
Edelweiss Air A350-900 (HB-IHC) departing Zurich

=== Current fleet ===
As of July 2026, Edelweiss Air operates the following aircraft:

Edelweiss Air fleet
Aircraft	In service	Orders	Passengers				Notes
Aircraft	In service	Orders	J	Y+	Y	Total	Notes
Airbus A320-200	15	—	12	—	158	170	
Airbus A320neo	1	5	—	—	180	180	To be transferred from Austrian Airlines from 2026.
Airbus A340-300	3	—	27	76	211	314	To be retired and replaced by Airbus A350-900.
Airbus A350-900	4	2	30	63	246	339	Replacing Airbus A340-300. Deliveries started from 2025. To be retrofitted.
Total	22	7					

=== Former fleet ===
Edelweiss Air has previously operated the following aircraft:

Edelweiss Air former fleet
Aircraft	Total	Introduced	Retired	Ref
Airbus A330-200	2	2000	2016	
Airbus A330-300	2	2011	2021	
Airbus A340-300	2	2016	2026	
McDonnell Douglas MD-83	3	1996	1999	
