= Vinci Airports =

French concessions and construction company

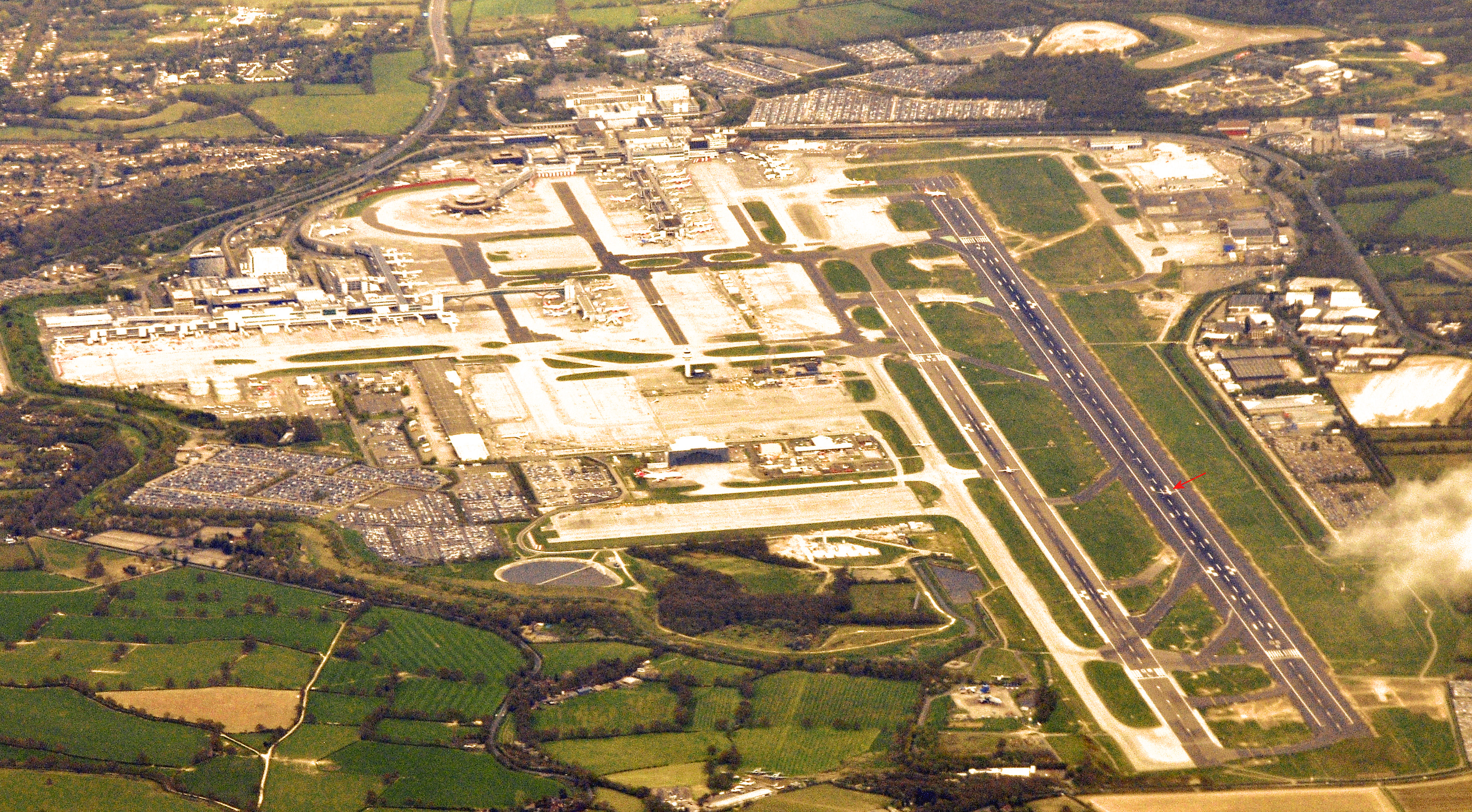
- London Gatwick
- Industry: Concessions
- Headquarters: France
- Area served: Worldwide
- Key people: Nicolas Notebaert (Chairman) since 2008
- Services: Airports operator
- Revenue: €2.679 billion (2022)
- Net income: €507 million (2022)
- Parent: Vinci SA, Vinci Concessions
- Website: www.vinci-airports.com

Vinci Airports is a subsidiary of Vinci Group, which develops and operates civil airports. The company develops a network of 65 airports in 13 countries including France, Portugal, Brazil, United States, Cambodia, Japan, Dominican Republic, Chile, Serbia, United Kingdom, Hungary, Costa Rica and Cabo Verde.

== History and development ==
In 1995, Vinci Airports obtained its first airport concession. A contract was signed, via its subsidiary Cambodia Airports, until 2040 for the airports of Phnom Penh and Siem Reap . Since 2006, Vinci Airports has also held the concession for a third international airport in Cambodia: Sihanoukville. The old Siem Reap airport ceased to operate upon the opening of the new Siem Reap airport on 16 October 2023.

In France Vinci Airports won its first tender for Grenoble Airport in 2003, followed by a second in 2004 for Chambéry Airport.

VINCI Airports was set up in Chile in 2015. The Nuevo Pudahuel consortium, including Vinci Airports (40%), Aéroports de Paris (45%) and Astaldi (15%), took over the operation of Santiago de Chile Airport for 20 years.

It was also in 2015 that Vinci Airports and its partner Orix were appointed prospective concessionaires for Kansai and Osaka International airports for a 44-year period starting 1 April 2016.

In 2018 Vinci Airports signed the concession contract for Belgrade Airport, Serbia and officially became the concessionaire in December 2018 for a 25-year term. In April 2018, Vinci Airports announced the acquisition of Airports Worldwide, a U.S. airport concession company, and thus became concessionaire for 8 airports including Belfast International Airport, Northern Ireland, Stockholm-Skavsta Airport, Sweden, Orlando-Sanford Airport, U.S.A., and Guanacaste Airport, Costa Rica.

In December 2018 Vinci Airports reached an agreement to buy 50.01% of the shares in Gatwick Airport Limited, the company that owns London Gatwick Airport, from its current shareholders, enabling it to become the majority shareholder for €3.2 billion.

In 2021 Vinci Airports won the concession for seven new airports (Manaus, Tabatinga, Téfé, Cruzeiro do Sul, Porto Velho, Rio Branco, Boa Vista) in the Amazon region of northern Brazil, for 30 years.

In December 2022 Vinci Airports acquired 30% of OMA (Grupo Aeroportuario del Centro Norte), the leading Mexican airport operator, which operates 13 airports in that country.

In July 2023, it was announced Vinci Airports had secured €60 million in financing to acquire seven airports in Cape Verde and subsequently took over the operations of the airports

On 6 June 2024, the government of Hungary announced that, together with Vinci Airports, they have purchased Budapest Airport, the operator of Budapest Liszt Ferenc International Airport, from its previous owners. Hungary and Vinci, after paying €3.1 billion in cash and assuming a net debt of €1.2 billion, now hold 80% and 20% ownership of the capital's airport, respectively. Vinci Airports will be the platform operator for decades to come, with a concession expiring in 2080.

== Subsidiaries ==
The company's subsidiaries in 2024:

- SEAGI – Grenoble Airport 100%
- SEACA – Chambéry Airport 100%
- SEACFA – Clermont-Ferrand Auvergne Airport 100%
- SEAPA – Ancenis Airport 100%
- SEATH – Toulon-Hyères Airport
- ANA – ANA Aeroportos de Portugal 100%
- Aeropuertos Dominicanos Siglo XXI (Aerodom) 100%
- Concessionária do Aeroporto de Salvador S.A. 100%
- Concessionária dos Aeroportos da Amazônia S.A. 100%
- Aéroports du Grand Ouest 85%
- Budapest Ferenc Liszt International Airport 20%
- Cambodia Airports 70%
- SEARD – Rennes and Dinard airports 49%
- Nuevo Pudahuel 40%
- Kansai Airports 40%
- Aéroports de Lyon 31%
- Annecy Mont-Blanc Airport 100%
- Gatwick Airport 50.01%
- Edinburgh Airport 50.01%
- Belfast International Airport 100%
- Belgrade Nikola Tesla Airport 100%
- Guanacaste Airport 45%
- OMA (Mexico) 30%
- Cabo Verde Airports 70% –
- Amílcar Cabral International Airport
- Aristides Pereira International Airport
- Maio Airport
- Nelson Mandela International Airport
- São Filipe Airport
- São Nicolau Airport
- São Vicente Airport
- Phnom Penh International Airport
- Sihanouk International Airport
- Dara Sakor International Airport
