= Cabo Verde Airlines =

International airline based in Cape Verde

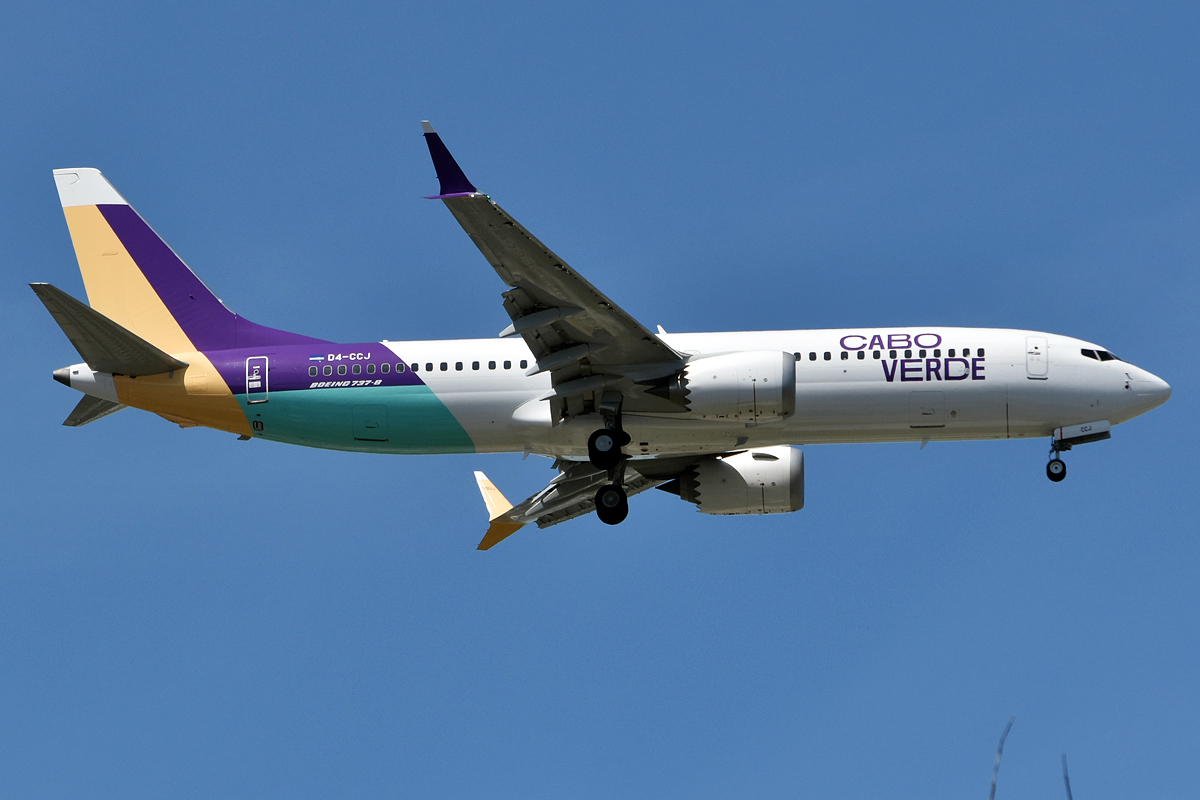
IATA	ICAO	Call sign
VR	TCV	CABOVERDE
- Founded: 1958
- Hubs: Sal International Airport
- Fleet size: 2
- Destinations: 9
- Parent company: State of Cabo Verde (100%)
- Headquarters: Sal, Cape Verde
- Key people: Pedro Barros, CEO
- Employees: 200
- Website: caboverdeairlines.com

Cabo Verde Airlines, formerly Transportes Aéreos de Cabo Verde (TACV; lit. 'Aerial Transport of Cape Verde'), is an international airline based in Cape Verde. It connects three continents with non-stop flights from their hub at Amílcar Cabral International Airport on Sal Island.

== History ==
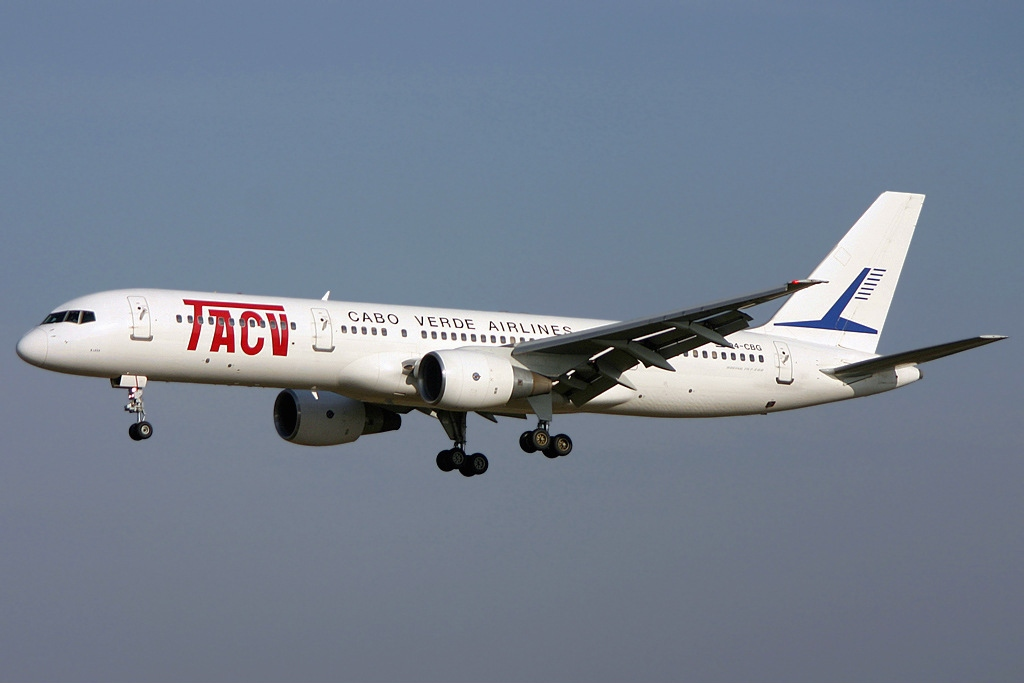
A former TACV branded Boeing 757-200 in 2007.

=== TACV ===
Cabo Verde Airlines was established in 1958. In July 1975, following the independence of Cape Verde, the airline was designated as the national carrier. It became a state-owned company in 1983. The airline was named TACV (acronym for Transportes Aéreos de Cabo Verde), and its logo included a blue wing with seven lines that represented the number of domestic inter-island flights offered by the airline. Until 1984, it served 8 of the 9 inhabited islands. Unacceptable safety standards at some of the country's other airports, namely Esperadinha Airport and Agostinho Neto Airport, led to the cancellation of flights to those islands. Subsequently, Brava's airport closed in 2003 and Santo Antão's closed in 2007. European flights began in 1985, with Lisbon as the first European destination. Also that year, the airline began services to Boston, Massachusetts using a McDonnell Douglas DC-10 provided by LAM Mozambique Airlines.

In 1996, Cabo Verde Airlines received its first Boeing 757-200, brand new from the Boeing factory, considered as “the pride and joy of Cape Verde Airlines", baptized with the name B.Leza. With B.Leza (registration D4-CBG), the airline began flying to Europe with its own aircraft and crew. Cabo Verde Airlines was the country's only airline until 1998 when Cabo Verde Express began operations. All of its international flights were at Sal until 2004. For several years, the two 757s served all of Cabo Verde Airlines' international routes.

In June 2015, the airline opened two new routes to Recife and Providence, Rhode Island, the latter replaced Boston's Logan International Airport, also its flight with Bissau resumed and served as a biweekly flight via Dakar, operated by the ATR 72.

In August 2017, the Cape Verdean government signed an agreement with Loftleidir Icelandic, part of the Icelandair Group, which turned the administration of Cabo Verde Airlines to the Icelandic group. The new administration discontinued the hub at Praia International Airport and moved the airline's hub to Amílcar Cabral International Airport. The new hub serving the Americas, Europe and Africa.

On November 5, 2017, Icelandair transferred the first Boeing 757-200 to the airline which was used to reinforce existing routes and to operate daily flights to Lisbon and flights to Fortaleza and Recife.

=== Cabo Verde Airlines ===
In May 2018, the airline announced it would rebrand as Cabo Verde Airlines in order to strengthen the connection of the national air carrier with its country. Cabo Verde Airlines has increased the country's connectivity with the world, with new routes to Salvador de Bahia, Milan, Paris, Lisbon, and Rome. The carrier also increased routes to Recife and Fortaleza with two leased 757-200s.

On March 1, 2019, Loftleidir paid 1.3 million euros (or 51% of shares) for the heavily indebted Cabo Verde Airlines, which resulted in it becoming the majority owner of the company. Soon after, Loftleidir nominated a new CEO for Cabo Verde Airlines. In June 2021, it was announced that Cabo Verde Airlines would get a new board of directors soon and start the restructuring and resizing phase of the company as well.

In July 2023, Cabo Verde Airlines added its first Boeing 737 MAX 8 to its fleet, utilizing it for international services.

== Destinations ==
As of May 2026, Cabo Verde Airlines serves the following scheduled destinations:

Brazil

- Recife - Recife International Airport

Cabo Verde

- Boa Vista - Rabil Airport
- Maio - Maio Airport
- Praia - Nelson Mandela International Airport
- Sal - Amílcar Cabral International Airport Hub
- São Nicolau - Preguiça Airport
- São Vicente - São Pedro Airport

France

- Paris - Charles de Gaulle Airport

Italy

- Bergamo - Orio al Serio International Airport

Portugal

- Lisbon - Lisbon Airport
- Porto - Porto Airport

United States

- Providence - Rhode Island T.F. Green International Airport

=== Codeshare and Interline agreements ===
Cabo Verde Airlines has codeshare and interline agreements with the following airlines:

=== Codeshare ===
- Africa World Airlines
- Azores Airlines
- TAAG Angola Airlines

=== Interline ===
- Africa World Airlines
- APG Airlines

== Fleet ==
=== Current fleet ===
As of August 2025, Cabo Verde Airlines operates the following aircraft:

Cabo Verde Airlines fleet
Aircraft	In service	Orders	Passengers			Notes
Aircraft	In service	Orders	C	Y	Total	Notes
ATR 72-600	—	2	—	70	70	
Boeing 737-700	1	—	12	108	120	
Boeing 737 MAX 8	1	—	—	179	179	
Total	2	2				

=== Historic fleet ===
As TACV, the airline operated the following aircraft:

Cabo Verde Airlines retired fleet
Aircraft	Total	Introduced	Retired	Notes
ATR 42-300	4	1994	2010	
ATR 42-500	1	2007	2017	
ATR 72-500	3	2007	2017	
Auster D.5	3	1962	Unknown	
Boeing 737-300	1	2002	2004	
Boeing 737-400	1	2015	2015	Leased from Go2Sky
Boeing 737-800	2	2012	2016	
Boeing 757-200	6	1996	2022	
Britten-Norman BN-2 Islander	3	1971	1984	
CASA C-212 Aviocar	2	1992	1993	
de Havilland DH.89 Dragon Rapide	1	1959	Unknown	
de Havilland DH.104 Dove	3	1962	Unknown	
de Havilland Canada DHC-6 Twin Otter	2	1977	2004	
Dornier 228	1	1999	1999	Crashed as Flight 5002
Embraer EMB-120 Brasilia	1	1989	1994	
Hawker Siddeley HS 748	2	1973	1998	

== Accidents and incidents ==
- TACV Flight 5002 took off from São Pedro, in the island of São Vicente, at 11:42 on 7 August 1999 for the short flight to Agostinho Neto airport, in the island of Santo Antão. Thirteen minutes after takeoff, rain and fog covered Santo Antão and placed the arrival airport below VFR minimums. The pilots made the decision to return to São Vicente at 11:56. The aircraft overflew the island of Santo Antão at 12:02, but crashed into the wooded mountainside at an altitude of 1,370 metres (4,490 ft). The aircraft burst into flames, killing all 18 passengers and crew on board.

== See also ==
- List of airlines of Cape Verde
