= São Nicolau Airport =

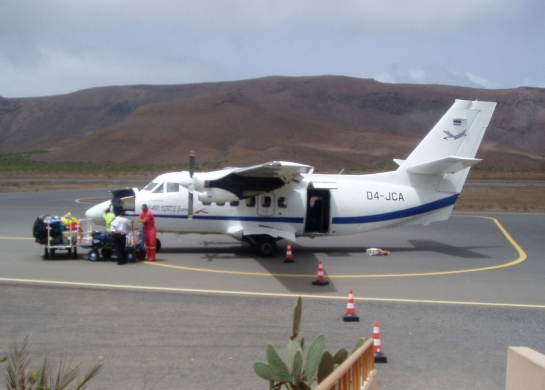
- IATA: SNE; ICAO: GVSN

Summary
- Airport type: Public
- Operator: Vinci Airports
- Serves: Ribeira Brava
- Location: São Nicolau, Cape Verde
- Elevation AMSL: 180 m (590 ft)
- Coordinates: 16°35′16″N 24°17′02″W
- Website: www.caboverde-airports.cv

Map
- Location in Cape Verde

Runways
Direction	Length		Surface
Direction	m	ft	Surface
01/19	1,400	4,593	Asphalt

Statistics (2017)
- Passengers: 27,038
- Aircraft operations: 574
- Metric tonnes of cargo: 13.8

São Nicolau Airport (Portuguese: Aeródromo de São Nicolau) (IATA: SNE, ICAO: GVSN) is the domestic airport of the island of São Nicolau, Cape Verde. It is located 3 km north of the village Preguiça and about 3 km south of the island capital Ribeira Brava. The runway is 1,400 meters long and is categorized 3C.

== History ==
In July 2023 Vinci Airports finalized a financial arrangement to take over seven airports in Cape Verde under a concession agreement signed with the island country’s government. The company will be responsible for the funding, operation, maintenance, extension and modernization of the airports for 40 years, alongside its subsidiary ANA-Aeroportos de Portugal, which holds 30% of the concession company Cabo Verde Airports.

== Airlines and destinations ==
Airlines	Destinations
Cabo Verde Airlines	Praia, Sal, São Vicente

== Statistics ==
Year	Passengers	Operations	Cargo (t)
2012	26,436	-	-
2013	24,732	618	31
2016	26,476	604	24
2017	27,038	574	14

== See also ==
- List of airports in Cape Verde
