= Maio Airport =

- IATA: MMO; ICAO: GVMA

Summary
- Airport type: Public
- Operator: Vinci Airports
- Serves: Porto Inglês
- Location: Maio, Cape Verde
- Elevation AMSL: 11 m / 36 ft
- Coordinates: 15°9′20″N 23°12′50.04″W
- Website: www.caboverde-airports.cv

Map
- Location in Cape Verde

Runways
Direction	Length		Surface
Direction	m	ft	Surface
01/19	1,200	3,937	Asphalt

Statistics (2017)
- Passengers: 15100
- Aircraft Operations: 351
- Metric tonnes of cargo: 7.2

The Maio Airport (Portuguese Aeródromo do Maio) (IATA: MMO, ICAO: GVMA) is an airport in Cape Verde located in the island of Maio, about 3 km north of the island capital Porto Inglês. Its runway measures 1,200 metres (3,900 ft) by 30 metres (98 ft) wide. Of the seven functioning civil airports in Cape Verde, Maio is the airport with the least traffic.

== History ==
In July 2023 Vinci Airports finalized a financial arrangement to take over seven airports in Cape Verde under a concession agreement signed with the island country’s government. The company will be responsible for the funding, operation, maintenance, extension and modernization of the airports for 40 years, alongside its subsidiary ANA-Aeroportos de Portugal, which holds 30% of the concession company Cabo Verde Airports.

== Airlines and destinations ==
Airlines	Destinations
Cabo Verde Airlines	Praia

== Statistics ==
Year	Passengers	Operations	Cargo (t)
2012	16,125	-	-
2013	10,544	289	12
2016	12,497	252	14.0
2017	15,100	351	7.2

== See also ==
- List of airports in Cape Verde
