= Health Communication Network =

- Industry: Health care, Practice management, Clinical management, Medical software
- Headquarters: Sydney, Australia
- Website: medicaldirector.com

Health Communication Network (HCN), trading as MedicalDirector, is a health software company headquartered in Sydney, with offices in Bundaberg and Melbourne.

== History ==
Health Communications Network was acquired by Primary Healthcare Ltd in February 2005.

The company was rebranded, as MedicalDirector in 2014. MedicalDirector provides electronic health records, patient management, billing, scheduling, care coordination, information on medicines, clinical content, and population health management services for general practitioners, and specialists in the healthcare industry.

Private equity firm Affinity Equity Partners acquired the company for AU$155 million on 30 March 2016 from HCN's then owner Primary Health Care Limited.
