= Cesária Évora Airport =

Cesária Évora Airport Aeroporto Internacional Cesária Évora
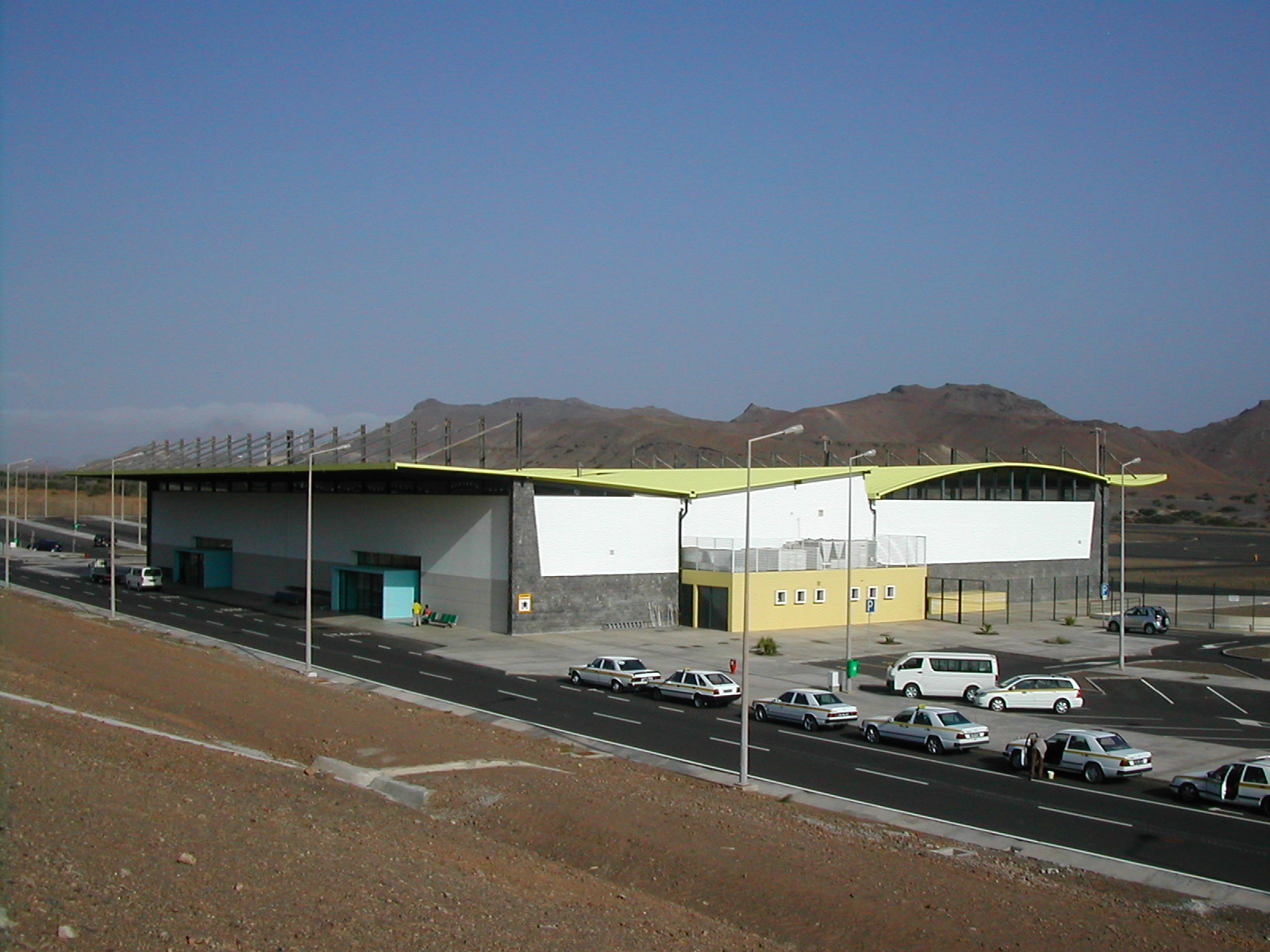
- IATA: VXE; ICAO: GVSV

Summary
- Airport type: Public
- Operator: Vinci Airports
- Serves: Mindelo, São Vicente
- Location: São Vicente, Cape Verde
- Elevation AMSL: 20 m (66 ft)
- Coordinates: 16°49′59.16″N 25°3′24.84″W
- Website: vinci-airports.cv

Map
- Location in Cape Verde

Runways
Direction	Length		Surface
Direction	m	ft	Surface
07/25	2,000	6,562	Asphalt

Statistics (2019)
- Passengers: 253,077
- Operations: 3,788
- Metric tonnes of cargo: 214.116

Cesária Évora Airport (Portuguese Aeroporto Internacional Cesária Évora) (IATA: VXE, ICAO: GVSV) is Cape Verde's fourth-busiest airport (after Sal, Praia, and Boa Vista), located on the island of São Vicente, nearly 5 kilometres (3.1 mi) from the centre of Mindelo. It is located in the valley area in the west of the island and is north of the village of São Pedro. Its runway is 2,000 metres (6,600 ft) long and its width is 45 metres (148 ft)

== History ==
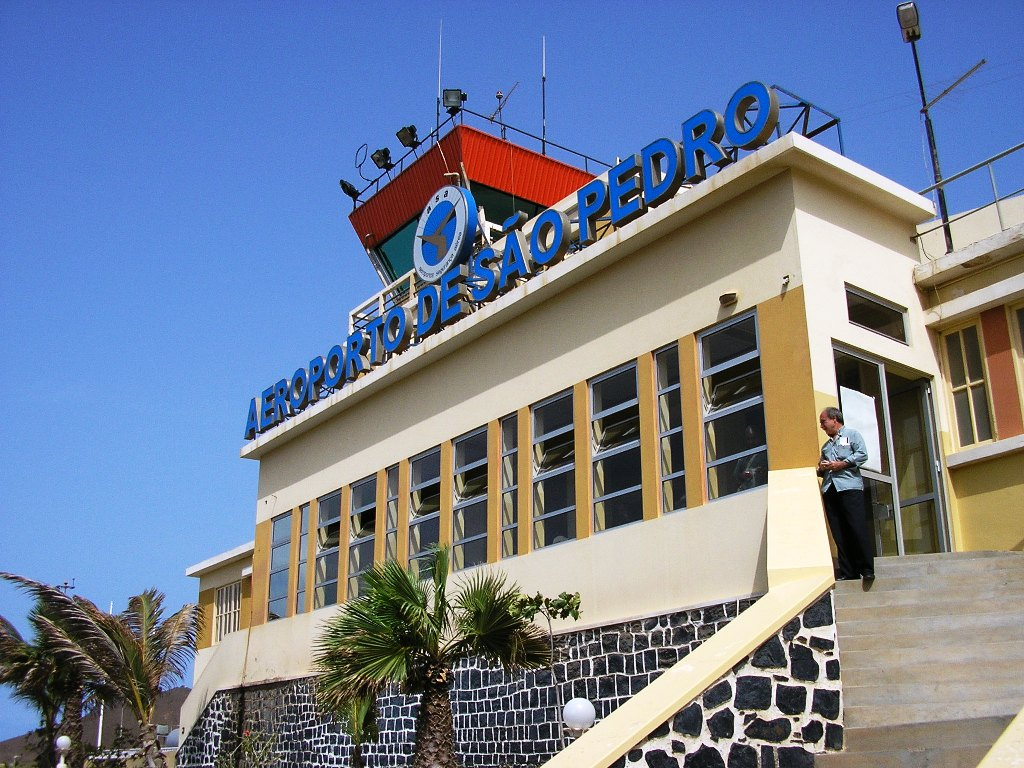
The former historic terminal building in 2007.

The airport was constructed in 1959–1960. It was expanded to be able to host international flights between 2005 and 2009. The airport was officially renamed after the highly acclaimed singer Cesária Évora in 2012. It has a modern terminal of about 11,000 square metres (120,000 ft^{2}) and has the capacity to process about 500 passengers an hour.

In July 2023 Vinci Airports finalized a financial arrangement to take over seven airports in Cape Verde under a concession agreement signed with the island country’s government. The company will be responsible for the funding, operation, maintenance, extension and modernization of the airports for 40 years, alongside its subsidiary ANA-Aeroportos de Portugal, which holds 30% of the concession company Cabo Verde Airports.

== Airlines and destinations ==
The following airlines operate regular scheduled and charter flights at São Vicente Airport:

Airlines	Destinations
Cabo Verde Airlines	Lisbon, Paris–Charles de Gaulle, Praia, Sal
easyJet	Lisbon, Porto
Edelweiss Air	Seasonal: Zurich
Luxair	Seasonal: Luxembourg
TAP Air Portugal	Lisbon
Transavia	Seasonal: Nantes, Paris–Orly
TUI fly Netherlands	Amsterdam^{A}

Notes

- ^A: This flight makes an intermediate stop in Sal. However, this carrier does not have rights to transport passengers solely between São Vicente and Sal.

== Statistics ==
In 2017, the annual passenger number was 266,221, of which 82,892 on international flights. There were 5,146 air operations, of which 780 international. 377 tonnes (371 long tons; 416 short tons) of cargo were transported, of which 227 international.

=== Passengers ===
Year	Passengers
2016	219,422
2017	266,221
2018	250,284
2019	253,077

=== Busiest international routes (2016) ===
	Destination	Passengers
1	Lisbon, Portugal	83,709
2	Amsterdam, Netherlands	16,537
3	Paris, France	631

== See also ==
- List of airports in Cape Verde
- Transport in São Vicente, Cape Verde
- List of buildings and structures in São Vicente, Cape Verde
