= Amílcar Cabral International Airport =

Amílcar Cabral International Airport Aeroporto Internacional Amílcar Cabral
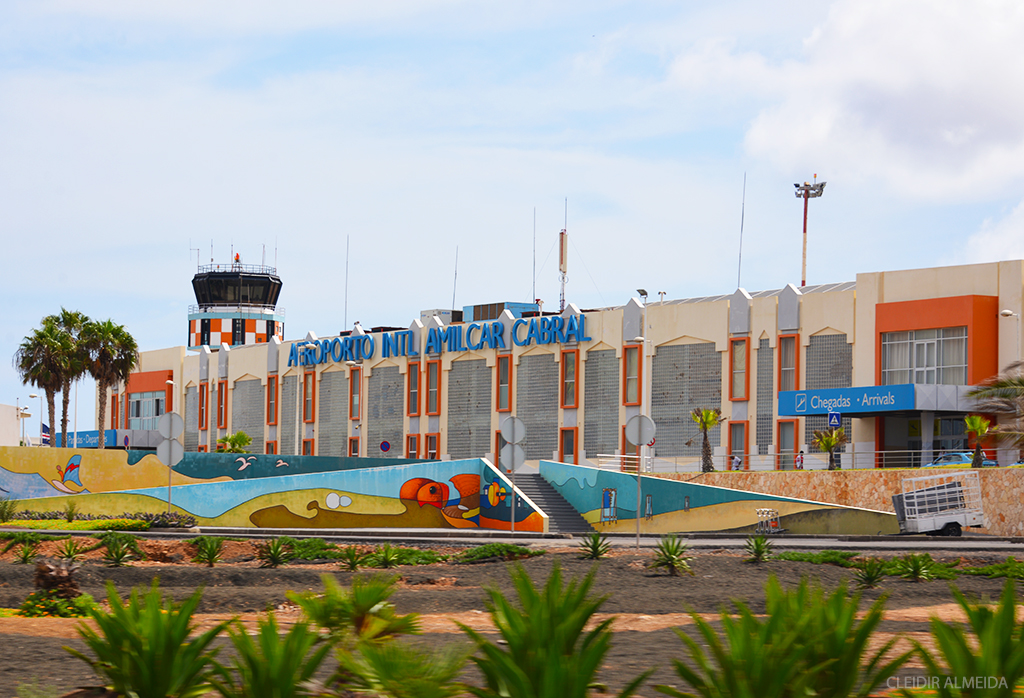
- IATA: SID; ICAO: GVAC

Summary
- Airport type: Public
- Operator: Vinci Airports
- Serves: Espargos, Sal
- Location: Sal, Cape Verde
- Hub for: Cabo Verde Airlines
- Elevation AMSL: 54 m (177 ft)
- Coordinates: 16°44′33″N 022°56′53″W
- Website: www.caboverde-airports.cv

Map
- Location in Cape Verde

Runways
Direction	Length		Surface
Direction	m	ft	Surface
01/19	3,272	10,735	Paved
07/25	1,500	4,921	Paved

Statistics (2019)
- Passengers: 1,192,828
- Operations: 14.576
- Metric tonnes of cargo: 443.3
- Sources: World Aero Data

Amílcar Cabral International Airport (IATA: SID, ICAO: GVAC), also known as Sal International Airport, is the main international airport of Cape Verde. The airport is named after the revolutionary leader Amílcar Cabral. It is located 2 kilometres (1.2 mi) west-southwest from Espargos on Sal Island. Sal is the main hub for the national airline, Cabo Verde Airlines; and serves as a base for carrier Cabo Verde Express. This airport was also one of NASA's locations for a facility to handle the Space Shuttle after reentering from orbit.

== History ==
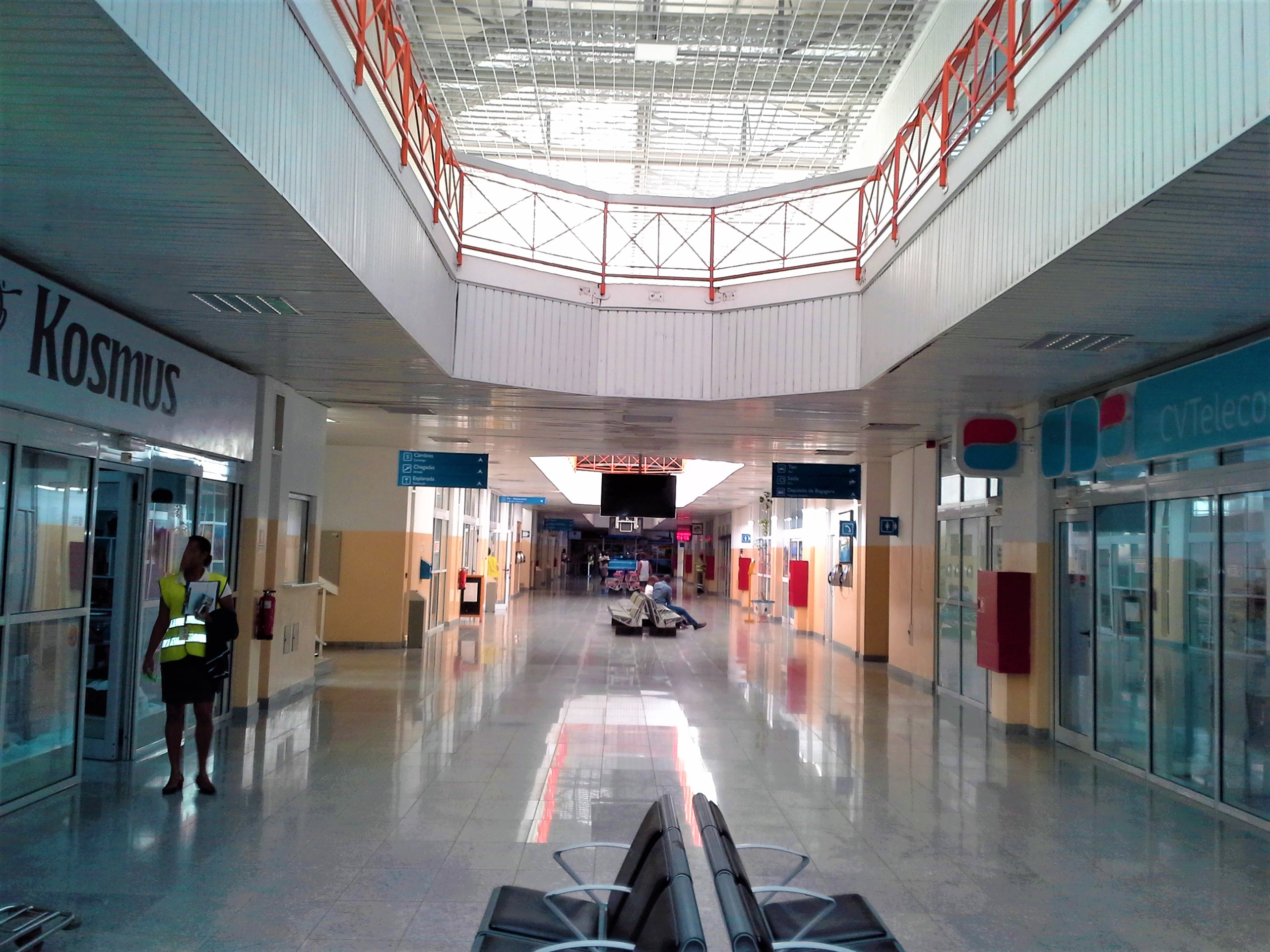
Terminal interior

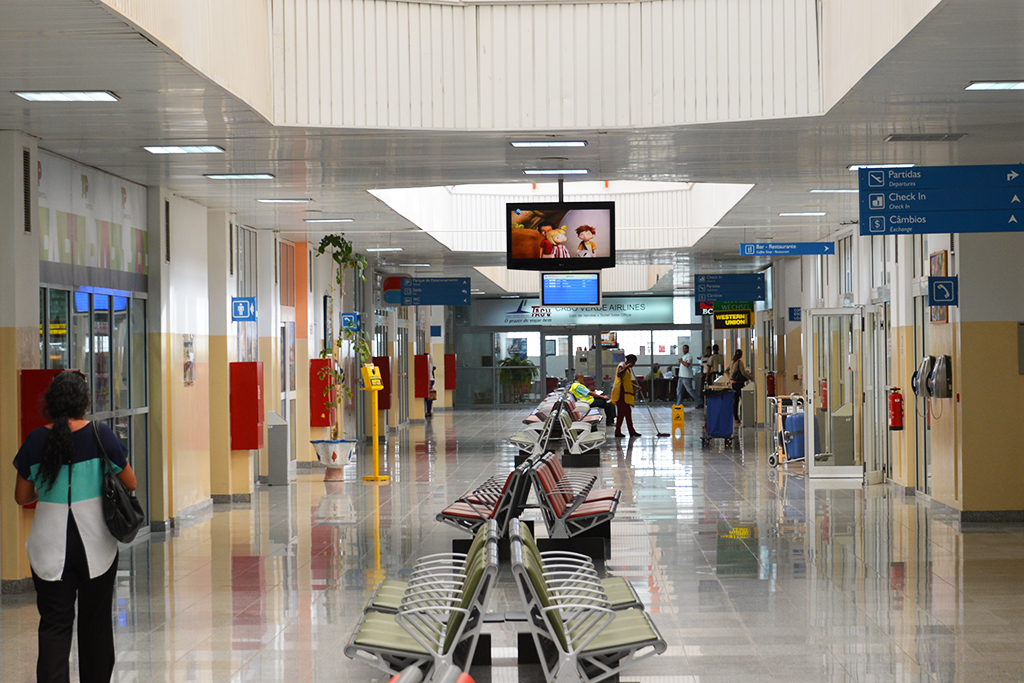
Terminal interior

=== Foundation and early years ===
The first airport on Sal Island was built in 1939 by Italy, as a fuel and provisions stopping-point on routes from Europe to South America. The first flight, an arrival from Rome and Seville, was on 15 December 1939. As a consequence of World War II, the Italian involvement in the airport project ceased. After World War II, the Portuguese colonial government purchased the airport from Italy and by 1949 the airport was fully operational. In 1950, DC-4 service of Alitalia began on the Rome — Sal — Buenos Aires and Rome — Sal — Caracas routes. In 1961, after Senegal's independence from France, Dakar became the stopping-point on the southern route, and a few years later a new version of the Douglas DC-8 introduced on the route rendered the stops at Sal or Dakar unnecessary.

Between 1960 and 1967 Sal was a stop of the Voo da amizade (Friendship Flight), a dedicated service between Brazil and Portugal. It was operated from 1960 to 1965 by Panair do Brasil and from 1965 to 1967 by TAP-Transportes Aéreos Portugueses and Varig. Only Brazilian and Portuguese citizens or foreigners with permanent residence in Brazil or Portugal could purchase tickets for those flights, which were extremely popular due to their low fares. At this time, Cape Verde was a Portuguese Overseas Province and therefore part of the territory of Portugal.

From 1963 to 1975, the Portuguese Air Force's No 1 Transit Airfield (AT1, Aeródromo de Trânsito n.º 1) was installed at the Sal airport. The AT1 supported the military air connections between European Portugal and the Portuguese African provinces, as well as serving as the operational base for the maritime patrol aircraft occasionally deployed in Cape Verde.

Beginning in 1967, Sal was used as a refueling stop by South African Airways, for flights to and from Europe, since SAA was denied landing rights by most African countries due to the international boycott of apartheid. By 1983, SAA operated 13 round trips per week between Sal and Johannesburg, using the island as a stop for its Boeing 747 services to New York, Houston, London, Brussels and Amsterdam. The island saw as many as 36 SAA flights per week in the mid-1980s, but this number was cut dramatically following the imposition of US sanctions in 1987. By 1996 only one weekly SAA flight stopped at Sal (service between Johannesburg and New York). Sal was later used as a fuel stop on SAA's Atlanta service starting in 2003. SAA's final flight to Atlanta was on 1 July 2006.

Aeroflot used Sal as a stop on its Il-62 services from Moscow and Budapest to Dakar and Conakry in the late 1970s. Cubana also operated Il-62s on the Havana-Sal-Luanda-Maputo route in the early 1980s, and the Havana-Sal-Bissau-Luanda route in the late 1980s.

In 1985, TACV began service to Boston, Massachusetts using a McDonnell Douglas DC-10 provided by LAM Mozambique Airlines. Boston hosts the largest Cape Verdean community in the United States. TACV flights to Boston have since been shifted to Praia International Airport. Other international destinations include inter alia Amsterdam, Lisbon, Luxembourg, Madrid, Paris, and Porto. Domestic destinations include Santiago and São Vicente.

=== Development since the 2000s ===
Until September 2005, it was the only airport in Cape Verde to serve international flights. There is now also international service to Nelson Mandela International Airport on Praia.

Since 2017 Sal has been a refuelling stop for the twice-weekly South Atlantic Air Bridge service operated by Air Tanker between the UK and the Falkland Islands. This is a temporary arrangement until the runway at Ascension Island is repaired which is expected to be in 2020.

In July 2023 Vinci Airports finalized a financial arrangement to take over seven airports in Cape Verde under a concession agreement signed with the island country's government. The company will be responsible for the funding, operation, maintenance, extension and modernization of the airports for 40 years, alongside its subsidiary ANA-Aeroportos de Portugal, which holds 30% of the concession company Cabo Verde Airports.

== Infrastructure ==
=== Terminal ===
Amílcar Cabral has one terminal. It is a two-storey building containing check-in, waiting, and arrival areas, as well as shopping, banking, and passenger services. The second floor houses airport operations and airline offices. There are four gates, and buses (Cobus 3000s) are used to transport passengers to the aircraft stands. Cabo Verde Express has its head office in the Concourse Hall. The two duty-free shops along with refreshment facilities, retail kiosks and outdoor smoking areas are located after security scanning and passport control, adjacent to the six departure gates.. The airport is also home to the area control centre for the Sal Oceanic flight information region, providing enroute air traffic control for flights passing over Cape Verde.

=== Runways ===
The airport's main runway is 3,272 m (10,734 ft) long and is the longest in Cape Verde. It is used for long-haul flights. It was also one of the designated emergency landing strips for the U.S. Space Shuttle. The second runway is 1,500 m (4,921 ft) long and was used by small planes. It is now closed for traffic.

== Airlines and destinations ==
The following airlines operate regular scheduled and charter flights at Sal Amílcar Cabral Airport:

=== Passenger ===
Airlines	Destinations
Air Senegal	Dakar–Diass
Binter Canarias	Gran Canaria
Bulgaria Air	Seasonal charter: Sofia
Cabo Verde Airlines	Bergamo, Boa Vista, Lisbon, Paris–Charles de Gaulle, Praia, Providence, Recife, São Nicolau, São Vicente; Seasonal: Bilbao, Porto
Corendon Dutch Airlines	Seasonal: Amsterdam
easyJet	Amsterdam, Bristol, Lisbon, London–Gatwick, Manchester, Milan–Malpensa, Porto
Edelweiss Air	Seasonal: Zurich
Enter Air	Seasonal charter: Katowice, Warsaw–Chopin
Luxair	Luxembourg
Neos	Bergamo, Milan–Malpensa, Rome–Fiumicino, Verona
Royal Air Maroc	Casablanca
Smartwings	Seasonal charter: Bilbao, Bratislava, Brno, Budapest, Katowice, Porto, Prague, Vienna, Warsaw–Chopin
Sunclass Airlines	Seasonal charter: Bergen, Billund, Copenhagen, Gothenburg, Helsinki, Oslo, Stavanger, Stockholm–Arlanda
TAP Air Portugal	Lisbon, Porto
Transavia	Bordeaux, Lyon, Marseille, Nantes, Paris–Orly, Toulouse
TUI Airways	Birmingham, Bristol, Glasgow, London–Gatwick, Manchester, Newcastle upon Tyne; Seasonal: East Midlands
TUI fly Belgium	Brussels
TUI fly Deutschland	Düsseldorf, Frankfurt, Hannover, Munich, Stuttgart
TUI fly Netherlands	Amsterdam; Seasonal: Eindhoven
TUI fly Nordic	Seasonal charter: Copenhagen, Gothenburg, Helsinki, Stockholm–Arlanda
Vueling	Seasonal: Barcelona

== Statistics ==
Year	Passengers	Operations	Cargo (t)
2016	914,696	11,164	816.3
2017	1,092,789	12,479	617.7
2018	1,184,636	13,429	429.3
2019	1,192,828	14,576	443.3

== Ground transport ==
The airport is located on the west side of the road (EN1-SL01) linking Espargos and Santa Maria, the island's main tourist destination. There is no scheduled public transport; taxicabs, shared cars known as "aluguer", and rental cars are available.

== See also ==
- List of buildings and structures in Cape Verde
