= Aristides Pereira International Airport =

Aristides Pereira International Airport Aeroporto Internacional Aristides Pereira
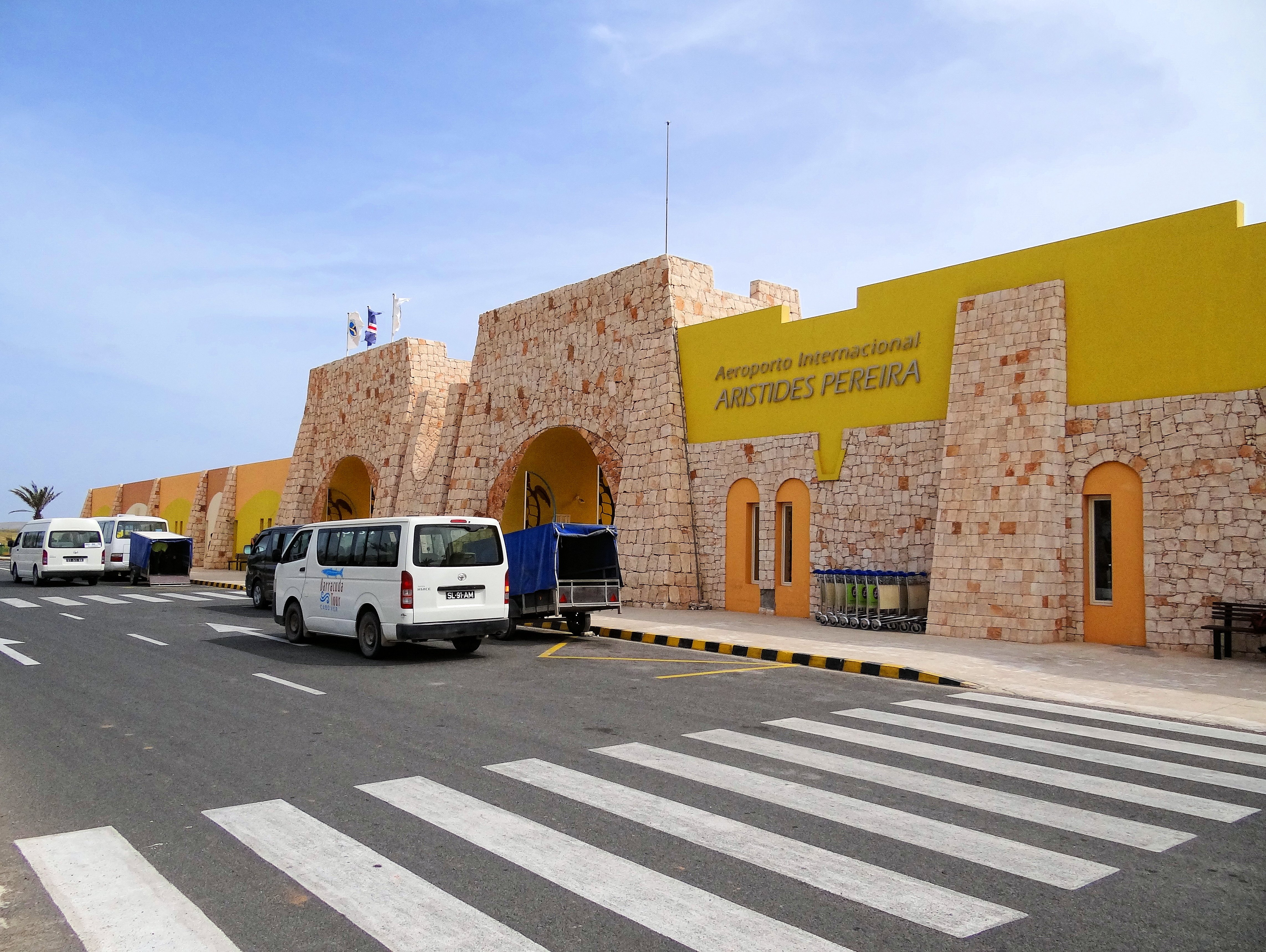
- IATA: BVC; ICAO: GVBA

Summary
- Airport type: Civil
- Operator: Vinci Airports
- Serves: Sal Rei, Boa Vista
- Location: Boa Vista, Cape Verde
- Elevation AMSL: 30 m (98 ft)
- Coordinates: 16°8′15″N 22°53′21.84″W
- Website: www.caboverde-airports.cv

Map
- Location in Cape Verde

Runways
| Direction | Length | | Surface |
| Direction | m | ft | Surface |
|---|---|---|---|
| 03/21 | 2,100 | 6,890 | Asphalt |

Statistics (2017)
- Passengers: 512,778
- Operations: 5,008
- Metric tonnes of cargo: 132

Aristides Pereira International Airport (Portuguese Aeroporto Internacional Aristides Pereira) (IATA: BVC, ICAO: GVBA) is an airport in Cape Verde located on the island of Boa Vista, about 5 km (3.1 mi) southeast of the island capital Sal Rei. It is the third-busiest airport in the country.

== History ==
The conversion of the existing airport of Rabil into an international airport started in 2005, and was completed in 2007. The runway was extended from 1,200 to 2,100 metres (3,900 to 6,900 ft) length and from 30 to 45 metres (98 to 148 ft) width. The project cost 21 million euros. The airport was officially opened on 31 October 2007.

In July 2023 Vinci Airports finalized a financial arrangement to take over seven airports in Cape Verde under a concession agreement signed with the island country’s government. The company will be responsible for the funding, operation, maintenance, extension and modernization of the airports for 40 years, alongside its subsidiary ANA-Aeroportos de Portugal, which holds 30% of the concession company Cabo Verde Airports.

== Airlines and destinations ==
The following airlines operate regular scheduled and charter flights at Aristides Pereira International Airport:

| Airlines | Destinations |
|---|---|
| easyJet | Porto |
| Edelweiss Air | Seasonal: Zürich |
| Luxair | Seasonal: Luxembourg |
| Neos | Milan–Malpensa, Rome–Fiumicino, Verona; Seasonal: Bergamo |
| Smartwings | Seasonal charter: Vienna |
| TAP Air Portugal | Lisbon |
| Transavia | Seasonal: Bordeaux, Nantes, Toulouse |
| TUI Airways | Birmingham, London–Gatwick, Manchester; Seasonal: East Midlands |
| TUI fly Belgium | Brussels |
| TUI fly Deutschland | Düsseldorf, Frankfurt, Hannover, Munich, Stuttgart |
| TUI fly Netherlands | Amsterdam |

== Statistics ==
| Year | Passengers | Operations | Cargo |
|---|---|---|---|
| 2012 | 425,701 | - | - |
| 2013 | 448,700 | 4,768 | 268 |
| 2016 | 465,049 | 4,600 | 209 |
| 2017 | 512,778 | 5,008 | 132 |

== See also ==
- List of buildings and structures in Cape Verde
- List of airports in Cape Verde
