= Nelson Mandela International Airport =

Airport serving Praia, Cape Verde

Praia International Airport Aeroporto Internacional Nelson Mandela
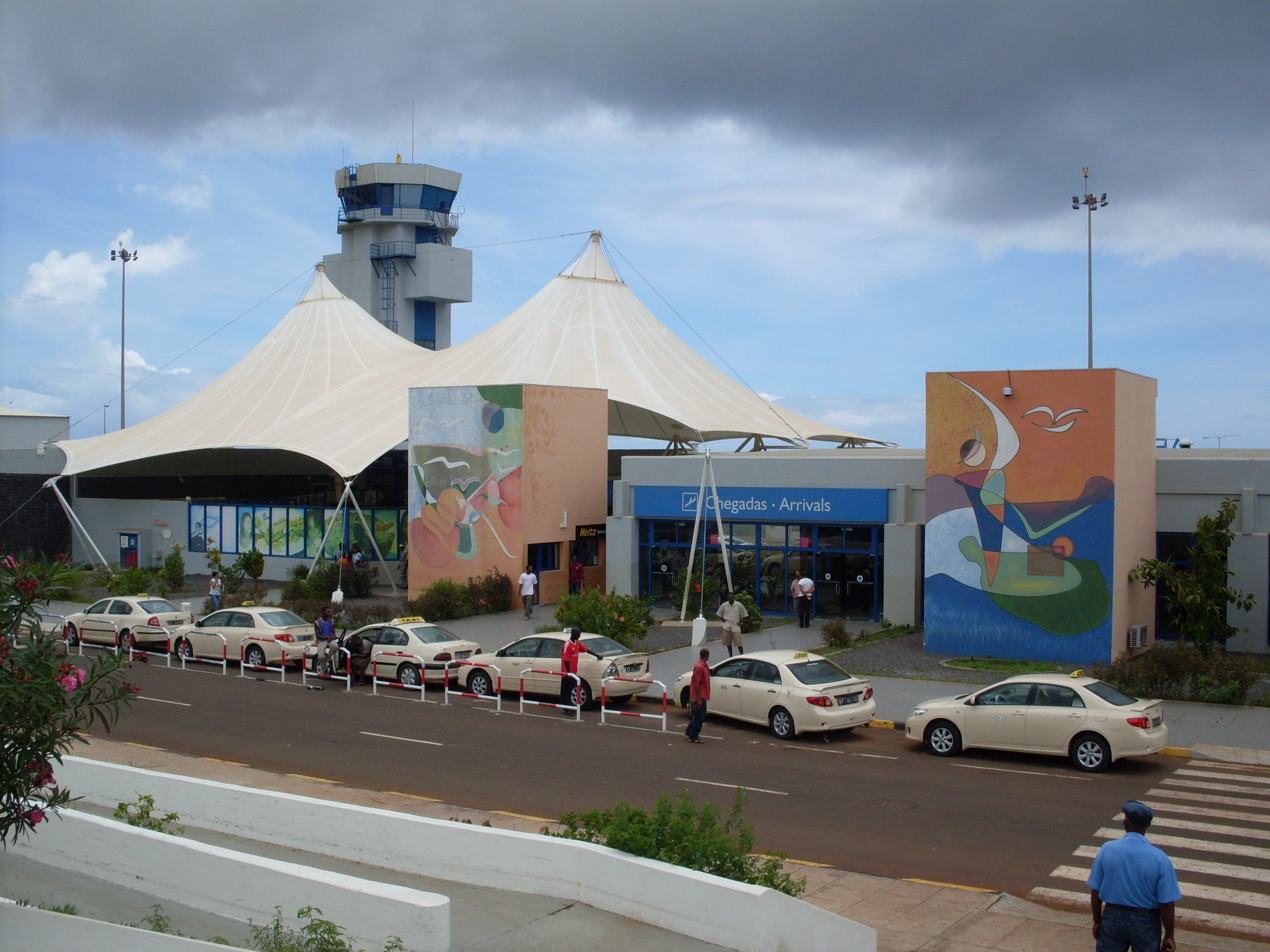
- IATA: RAI; ICAO: GVNP

Summary
- Airport type: Public
- Operator: Vinci Airports
- Serves: Santiago Island
- Location: Praia, Cape Verde
- Opened: 6 October 2005; 21 years ago
- Elevation AMSL: 70 m (230 ft)
- Coordinates: 14°55′27.12″N 23°29′38.04″W
- Website: www.caboverde-airports.cv

Map
- Location in Cape Verde

Runways
| Direction | Length | | Surface |
| Direction | m | ft | Surface |
|---|---|---|---|
| 03/21 | 2,100 | 6,890 | Asphalt |

Statistics (2017)
- Passengers: 662,356
- Operations: 11236
- Metric tonnes of cargo: 959

Nelson Mandela International Airport (IATA: RAI, ICAO: GVNP), also known as Praia International Airport, is an international airport of Santiago Island in Cape Verde. It was opened in October 2005, replacing the old Francisco Mendes International Airport. It is located about 3 km (1.9 mi) northeast of the city centre of Praia in the southeastern part of the island of Santiago.

== History ==
The first flight to the new airport was on 6 October 2005 with a flight from Sal, Cape Verde. Even though the airport serves the capital and largest city, Praia as well as the island of Santiago, Cape Verde's busiest international airport is Amílcar Cabral International Airport located on the smaller island of Sal.

In January 2012 a Cape Verde government statement noted that Praia International Airport was renamed after Nelson Mandela, the first president of South Africa. Modernization works, including a new departures hall, were scheduled for completion in July 2018.

In July 2023 Vinci Airports finalized a financial arrangement to take over seven airports in Cape Verde under a concession agreement signed with the island country’s government. The company will be responsible for the funding, operation, maintenance, extension and modernization of the airports for 40 years, alongside its subsidiary ANA-Aeroportos de Portugal, which holds 30% of the concession company Cabo Verde Airports.

== Airlines and destinations ==
The following airlines operate regular scheduled and charter flights at Praia Airport:

| Airlines | Destinations |
|---|---|
| Air Senegal | Dakar–Diass |
| ASKY Airlines | Dakar–Diass, Lomé |
| Azores Airlines | Ponta Delgada |
| Cabo Verde Airlines | Lisbon, Paris–Charles de Gaulle, Providence, Recife |
| easyJet | Lisbon, Porto |
| Edelweiss Air | Seasonal: Zurich |
| Luxair | Seasonal: Luxembourg |
| Royal Air Maroc | Casablanca |
| TAAG Angola Airlines | Luanda |
| TAP Air Portugal | Lisbon, Porto |
| Transair | Dakar–Diass |
| Transavia | Seasonal: Amsterdam, Lyon, Marseille, Paris–Orly |

== Statistics ==
| Year | Passengers | Operations | Cargo (t) |
|---|---|---|---|
| 2012 | 497,049 | | |
| 2013 | 505,497 | 8,978 | 1,418 |
| 2016 | 522,584 | 8,641 | 1,109 |
| 2017 | 662,356 | 11,236 | 959 |

== See also ==
- List of buildings and structures in Santiago, Cape Verde
