= List of defunct airlines of Portugal =

This is a list of defunct airlines of Portugal.

Airline	Image	IATA	ICAO	Callsign	Commenced operations	Ceased operations	Notes
ACEF Transportes Aereos Cargas			CFM	ACEF	1998	2003	Operated Convair 440, Convair 580
Aero Algarve			DSK	SKYBANNER	?	?	
Aero Portuguesa					1934	1953	Absorbed by TAP
Aero Vilamoura			VMR	AERO VILAMOURA	2000s	2000s	Operated Cessna Skyhawk
Aerobeira			ARA	AEROBEIRA	?	?	
Aerocondor		2B	ARD	AEROCONDOR	1984	2008	
Agroar Carga Aérea			GRR	AGROAR	1992	2011	
Air Atlantis		EJ	AIA	AIR ATLANTIS	1985	1993	
Air Columbus		BO	CNB	AIR COLUMBUS	1988	1994	
Air Global					1998	1999	Operated leased Boeing 737-300
Air Luxor		LK	LXR	AIRLUXOR	1988	2006	
Air Madeira		MM	MMZ		1993	2000	Renamed to EuroAtlantic Airways
Air Sul		FK	SUL	AIRSUL	1989	1992	Operated leased Boeing 737-200
Air Zarco		MM	MMZ		1993	2000	Used trade name Air Madeira
Algarvilara			ALR	ALGARVILARA	?	?	
Arlinair Portugal			RLP		2008	2012	Renamed to Lease Fly. Operated ATR 42
ARTOP (Aero Topográfica)					1958	1958	Operated Martin PBM Mariner
Avialgarve			AVG	ALGARVE	1988	1996	Operated Falcon 20, Beech Baron, Rockwell Turbo Commander
Eurafric					1988	1996	
Euroair					1993	1994	Established as Linhas Aéreas Regionais in 1985. Operated Dornier 228
LAR Transregional		TH	PDF		1985	1993	Renamed to Euroair. Operated British Aerospace ATP
Lusitania Airways			LUA	LUSITANIA	2008	2009	Charter carrier. Operated Airbus A320-200
Luzair			LUZ	LISBON JET	1998	2011	
Masterjet			LMJ	MASTERJET	2003	2016	Established as Air Luxor Corporate Jets. Renamed to Luxaviation Portugal
Orbest		6O	OBS	ORBEST	2007	2020	Merged with Evelop Airlines and renamed to Iberojet
OceanAir			OCN	OCEANAIR	1990	1998	Renamed to SATA International
PGA Express		OC	OAC		2001	2015	
PGA Portugália Airlines		NI	PGA	PORTUGALIA	1990	2016	Rebranded TAP Express
Portugália Airlines		NI	PGA		1989	1997	Renamed to PGA Portugália Airlines
SATA International		S4	RZO	AIR AZORES	1998	2015	Renamed/merged to Azores Airlines
Sociedade Açoreana de Estudos Aéreos					1947	1980	Renamed to SATA Air Açores. Operated de Havilland Dove, Douglas DC-3, Douglas DC-6, HS 748
TAP Air Portugal		TP	TAP		1979	2005	Renamed to TAP Portugal
TAP Portugal		TP	TAP		2005	2017	Renamed to TAP Air Portugal
Transportes Aéreos Portugueses					1946	1978	Renamed to TAP Air Portugal. Operated Douglas DC-3, Douglas DC-4, Boeing 707, Lockheed Super Constellation, Sud Aviation Caravelle
Windavia Airlines					2013	2014	Operated Airbus A320-200
Yes - Linhas Aéreas Charter			YSS		2000	2004	Operated Lockheed L-1011 TriStar

== See also ==
- List of airlines of Portugal
- List of airports in Portugal
