= List of TAP Air Portugal destinations =

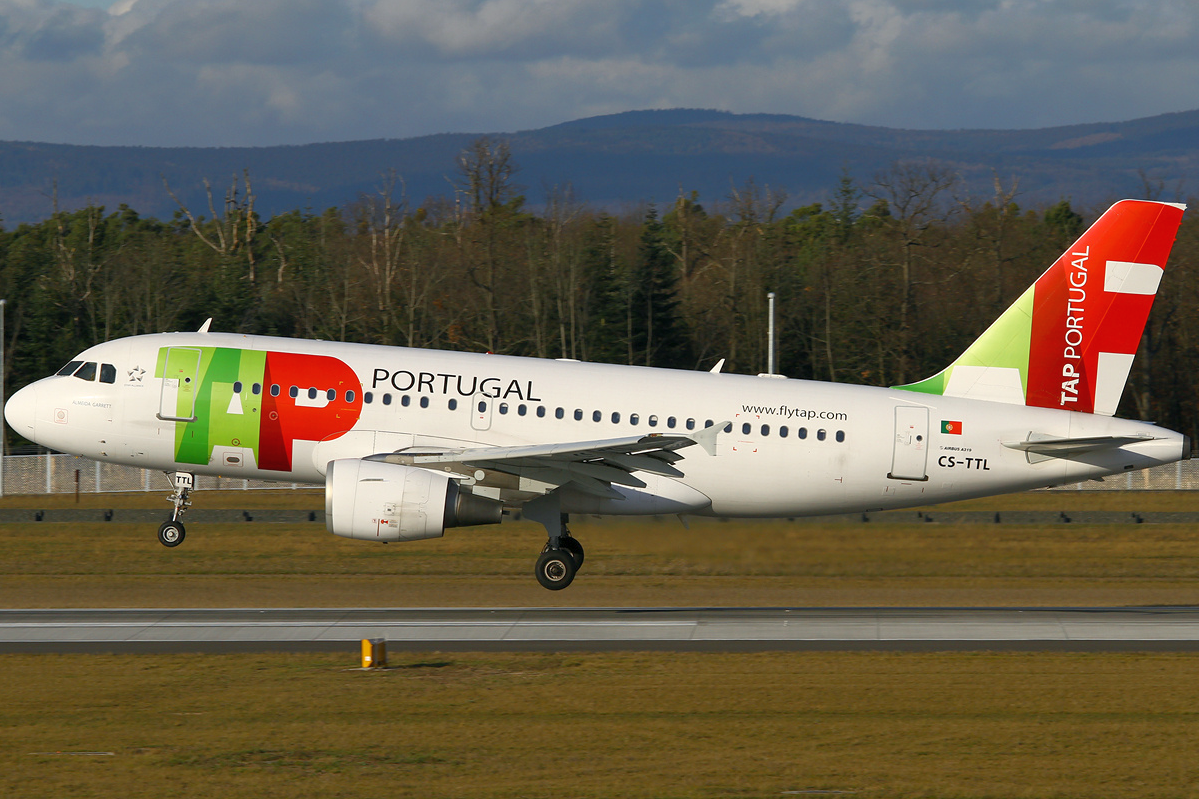
A TAP Portugal Airbus A319-100 lands at Frankfurt Airport in 2011.

TAP Air Portugal was founded as a division of Portugal's Civil Aviation Department under the name Transportes Aéreos Portugueses on 14 March 1945, and started operations on 19 September 1946, initially serving the Lisbon–Madrid route using the Douglas DC-3. A year later, the carrier added a route to Angola and Mozambique, at the time claimed to be the world's longest route operated with a Douglas DC-3, having 13 intermediate stops.

In 1957, the airline deployed Super Constellations on the Lisbon–London and Lisbon–Paris sectors, yet operations of the type date back to November 1955, when these aircraft started flying the route that linked Portugal with Portuguese Angola and Portuguese Mozambique. By December 1957, the carrier's network consisted of the long-haul Lisbon–Kano–Leopoldville–Luanda–Lourenço Marques route, as well as medium- and short-haul routes radiating from Lisbon and serving Casablanca, London, Madrid, Paris and Tangier, and a single domestic flight between Lisbon and Porto. On 1 November 1962, the airline started services between Lisbon and London, flying the route using the Sud Aviation Caravelle, taking over the services that had been operated by British European Airways on behalf of the company.

As of August 2012, TAP Portugal was the European airline with the most destinations in Brazil (10), being the leader in terms of passengers transported between this country and Europe, in comparison with their European counterparts, as well as with the Brazilian ones. As of August 2012, the airline was the third largest to serve Latin America by number of passengers; as of March 2013, the carrier shifted to the fourth place in the Europe-Latin America sector. Data from the latest financial report, corresponding to the fiscal year 2012, showed that the airline had its main source of traffic in Europe, and their most important long-haul market was South America.

Apart from Brazil, the countries with the most destinations served by the carrier are Spain (7), France (6) and Germany (5). TAP Portugal also flies to other 25 international destinations in Europe, 15 in Africa, two in the United States and one more in Latin America (Caracas). At the end of 2013, TAP announced its plan to start flying to six additional destinations in Europe during 2014 (Nantes, Hannover, Tallinn, Gothenburg, Belgrade and Saint Petersburg), whose schedule was announced before 31 March 2014. As of June 2014, the number of destinations in Brazil served by the carrier increased to 12 with the addition of Belém and Manaus to the route network. During July 2014, TAP Portugal launched services to Belgrade, Bogotá, Gothenburg, Hanover, Nantes, Oviedo, Panama City, Saint Petersburg and Tallinn.

== List ==
TAP Air Portugal's route network included 84 destinations in 35 countries, as of March 2015. Following is a list of destinations the airline flies to according to its scheduled services. It also includes cities served by the airline's subsidiaries Portugália and TAP Express, as well as terminated destinations.

Country	City	Airport	Notes	Refs
Algeria	Algiers	Houari Boumediene Airport		
Angola	Luanda	Dr. António Agostinho Neto International Airport		
Angola	Luanda	Quatro de Fevereiro Airport	Airport closed	
Argentina	Buenos Aires	Ministro Pistarini International Airport	Terminated	
Austria	Vienna	Vienna International Airport		
Belgium	Brussels	Brussels Airport		
Brazil	Belém	Val de Cans International Airport		
Brazil	Belo Horizonte	Tancredo Neves International Airport		
Brazil	Brasília	Brasília International Airport		
Brazil	Campinas	Viracopos International Airport	Terminated	
Brazil	Curitiba	Afonso Pena International Airport		
Brazil	Florianópolis	Hercilio Luz International Airport		
Brazil	Fortaleza	Pinto Martins – Fortaleza International Airport		
Brazil	Maceió	Maceió International Airport		
Brazil	Manaus	Eduardo Gomes International Airport		
Brazil	Natal	Greater Natal International Airport		
Brazil	Porto Alegre	Salgado Filho International Airport		
Brazil	Recife	Recife/Guararapes–Gilberto Freyre International Airport		
Brazil	Rio de Janeiro	Rio de Janeiro/Galeão International Airport		
Brazil	Salvador	Deputado Luís Eduardo Magalhães International Airport		
Brazil	São Luís	Marechal Cunha Machado International Airport	Begins 26 October 2026	
Brazil	São Paulo	São Paulo/Guarulhos International Airport		
Canada	Montreal	Montréal–Trudeau International Airport		
Canada	Toronto	Toronto Pearson International Airport		
Cape Verde	Boa Vista	Aristides Pereira International Airport		
Cape Verde	Praia	Nelson Mandela International Airport		
Cape Verde	Sal	Amílcar Cabral International Airport		
Cape Verde	São Vicente	Cesária Évora Airport		
Colombia	Bogotá	El Dorado International Airport	Terminated	
Croatia	Dubrovnik	Dubrovnik Airport	Terminated	
Cuba	Varadero	Juan Gualberto Gómez Airport	Terminated	
Curaçao	Willemstad	Hato International Airport	Terminated	
Czech Republic	Prague	Václav Havel Airport Prague		
Democratic Republic of the Congo	Kinshasa	N'djili Airport	Terminated	
Denmark	Copenhagen	Copenhagen Airport		
Dominican Republic	Punta Cana	Punta Cana International Airport	Terminated	
Estonia	Tallinn	Tallinn Airport	Terminated	
Finland	Helsinki	Helsinki Airport		
France	Bordeaux	Bordeaux–Mérignac Airport		
France	Lyon	Lyon–Saint-Exupéry Airport		
France	Marseille	Marseille Provence Airport		
France	Nantes	Nantes Atlantique Airport		
France	Nice	Nice Côte d'Azur Airport		
France	Paris	Charles de Gaulle Airport	Terminated	
France	Paris	Orly Airport		
France	Toulouse	Toulouse–Blagnac Airport		
Gambia	Banjul	Banjul International Airport		
Germany	Berlin	Berlin Brandenburg Airport		
Germany	Berlin	Berlin Schönefeld Airport	Airport closed	
Germany	Berlin	Berlin Tegel Airport	Airport closed	
Germany	Cologne	Cologne Bonn Airport	Terminated	
Germany	Düsseldorf	Düsseldorf Airport		
Germany	Frankfurt	Frankfurt Airport		
Germany	Hamburg	Hamburg Airport		
Germany	Hanover	Hannover Airport	Terminated	
Germany	Munich	Munich Airport		
Germany	Stuttgart	Stuttgart Airport		
Ghana	Accra	Accra International Airport		
Greece	Athens	Athens International Airport		
Guinea	Conakry	Ahmed Sékou Touré International Airport	Terminated	
Guinea-Bissau	Bissau	Osvaldo Vieira International Airport		
Hungary	Budapest	Budapest Ferenc Liszt International Airport		
Ireland	Dublin	Dublin Airport		
Israel	Tel Aviv	Ben Gurion Airport	Suspended until 27 March 2027	
Italy	Bologna	Bologna Guglielmo Marconi Airport		
Italy	Florence	Florence Airport		
Italy	Milan	Milan Linate Airport	Terminated	
Italy	Milan	Milan Malpensa Airport		
Italy	Naples	Naples International Airport		
Italy	Rome	Rome Fiumicino Airport		
Italy	Turin	Turin Airport	Terminated	
Italy	Venice	Venice Marco Polo Airport		
Ivory Coast	Abidjan	Félix-Houphouët-Boigny International Airport		
Luxembourg	Luxembourg	Luxembourg Airport		
Mali	Bamako	Bamako–Sénou International Airport	Terminated	
Mexico	Cancún	Cancún International Airport		
Macau	Macau	Macau International Airport	Terminated	
Morocco	Agadir	Agadir–Al Massira Airport	Seasonal	
Morocco	Casablanca	Mohammed V International Airport		
Morocco	Marrakesh	Marrakesh Menara Airport		
Morocco	Oujda	Angads Airport		
Morocco	Tanger	Tangier Ibn Battouta Airport		
Mozambique	Maputo	Maputo International Airport		
Mozambique	Beira	Beira Airport	Terminated	
Netherlands	Amsterdam	Amsterdam Airport Schiphol		
Nigeria	Kano	Mallam Aminu Kano International Airport	Terminated	
Norway	Oslo	Oslo Fornebu Airport	Airport closed	
Norway	Oslo	Oslo Gardermoen Airport		
Panama	Panama City	Tocumen International Airport	Terminated	
Poland	Warsaw	Warsaw Chopin Airport		
Portugal	Faro	Faro Airport		
Portugal	Funchal	Madeira Airport	Focus city	
Portugal	Horta	Horta Airport	Terminated	
Portugal	Lisbon	Lisbon Airport	Hub	
Portugal	Pico	Pico Airport	Terminated	
Portugal	Ponta Delgada	João Paulo II Airport		
Portugal	Porto	Porto Airport	Focus city	
Portugal	Porto Santo	Porto Santo Airport	Seasonal	
Portugal	Santa Maria Island	Santa Maria Airport	Terminated	
Portugal	Terceira	Lajes Field		
Republic of the Congo	Brazzaville	Maya-Maya Airport	Terminated	
Romania	Bucharest	Bucharest Henri Coandă International Airport	Terminated	
Russia	Moscow	Domodedovo International Airport	Terminated	
Russia	Saint Petersburg	Pulkovo Airport	Terminated	
São Tomé and Príncipe	São Tomé	São Tomé International Airport		
Senegal	Dakar	Blaise Diagne International Airport		
Senegal	Dakar	Léopold Sédar Senghor International Airport	Terminated	
Serbia	Belgrade	Belgrade Nikola Tesla Airport	Terminated	
South Africa	Cape Town	Cape Town International Airport		
South Africa	Johannesburg	O. R. Tambo International Airport	Terminated	
Spain	A Coruña	A Coruña Airport	Terminated	
Spain	Alicante	Alicante–Elche Miguel Hernández Airport		
Spain	Asturias	Asturias Airport		
Spain	Barcelona	Josep Tarradellas Barcelona–El Prat Airport		
Spain	Bilbao	Bilbao Airport		
Spain	Fuerteventura	Fuerteventura Airport		
Spain	Ibiza	Ibiza Airport		
Spain	Las Palmas	Gran Canaria Airport		
Spain	Madrid	Adolfo Suárez Madrid–Barajas Airport		
Spain	Mahón	Menorca Airport	Seasonal	
Spain	Málaga	Málaga Airport		
Spain	Oviedo	Oviedo Airport	Terminated	
Spain	Palma de Mallorca	Palma de Mallorca Airport	Seasonal	
Spain	Santiago de Compostela	Santiago–Rosalía de Castro Airport		
Spain	Seville	Seville Airport		
Spain	Valencia	Valencia Airport		
Spain	Vigo	Vigo–Peinador Airport	Terminated	
Sweden	Gothenburg	Göteborg Landvetter Airport	Terminated	
Sweden	Stockholm	Stockholm Arlanda Airport		
Switzerland; France; Germany	Basel; Mulhouse; Freiburg	EuroAirport Basel Mulhouse Freiburg		
Switzerland	Geneva	Geneva Airport		
Switzerland	Zurich	Zurich Airport		
Thailand	Bangkok	Don Mueang International Airport	Terminated	
Tunisia	Djerba	Djerba–Zarzis International Airport	Seasonal	
Tunisia	Monastir	Monastir Habib Bourguiba International Airport	Seasonal	
United Kingdom	London	London City Airport	Terminated	
United Kingdom	London	Gatwick Airport		
United Kingdom	London	Heathrow Airport		
United Kingdom	Manchester	Manchester Airport		
United Kingdom	Newcastle upon Tyne	Newcastle Airport	Terminated	
United States	Boston	Logan International Airport		
United States	Chicago	O'Hare International Airport		
United States	Los Angeles	Los Angeles International Airport		
United States	Miami	Miami International Airport		
United States	New York City	John F. Kennedy International Airport		
United States	Newark	Newark Liberty International Airport		
United States	Orlando	Orlando International Airport	Begins 29 October 2026	
United States	San Francisco	San Francisco International Airport		
United States	Washington, D.C.	Washington Dulles International Airport		
Venezuela	Caracas	Simón Bolívar International Airport		
Zimbabwe	Harare	Robert Gabriel Mugabe International Airport	Terminated	
