= List of airlines of Portugal =

This is a list of national airlines currently operating in Portugal.

== Scheduled airlines ==
| Airline | ICAO | IATA | Image | Callsign | Commenced operations | Notes |
|---|---|---|---|---|---|---|
| Azores Airlines | RZO | S4 | | | 1998 | |
| Orbest | OBS | 6O | | ORBEST | 2007 | |
| SATA Air Açores | SAT | SP | | | 1941 | S.A.T.A. stands for the Portuguese words Sociedade Açoriana de Transportes Aéreos. |
| Sevenair Air Services | RVP | WV | | | 2000 | Formerly Aero VIP |
| TAP Express | PGA | NI+TP | | | 2016 | |
| TAP Air Portugal | TAP | TP | | | 1946 | Flag carrier. T.A.P. stands for the Portuguese words Transportes Aéreos Portugueses. |
| World2Fly Portugal | WPT | 3P | | | 2021 | |

== Charter airlines ==
| Airline | ICAO | IATA | Image | Callsign | Commenced operations | Notes |
|---|---|---|---|---|---|---|
| EuroAtlantic Airways | MMZ | MM | | EuroAtlantic Airways | 2000 | |
| Everjets | EVJ | | | Everjets | 2015 | |
| Hi Fly | HFY | 5K | | SKY FLYER | 2006 | |
| Lease Fly | LZF | | | | 2012 | |
| NetJets Europe | NJE | 1I | | | 1996 | |
| Omni - Aviação e Tecnologia | OAV | OC | | | 1998 | |
| White Airways | WHT | | | | 2004 | |
| World2Fly Portugal | WPT | 3P | | | 2021 | |

== See also ==
- List of defunct airlines of Portugal
- List of airlines
- List of airports in Portugal
