= Whitejets =

Charter airline of Brazil

Whitejets Transportes Aéreos
IATA	ICAO	Call sign
W7	WTJ	WHITEJET
- Founded: 2010
- Commenced operations: 2010
- Ceased operations: 2014
- Hubs: Viracopos International Airport
- Secondary hubs: São Paulo–Guarulhos International Airport
- Destinations: Charters
- Parent company: Omni Aviation; White Airways
- Headquarters: Campinas, Brazil
- Key people: Douglas Ferreira Machado, Rui de Almeida, José Manuel Antunes
- Website: whitejets.com.br voepop.com.br/empresa/site/

Whitejets Transportes Aéreos Ltda., also doing business as Whitejets Airways, was an airline based in Rio de Janeiro, Brazil which was founded in 2010. It is authorized to operate non-regular domestic and international charter flights.

== History ==
Whitejets was a non-regular charter airline that served domestic and international destinations as contracted by a pool of tour-operators, centralized by Club Vip tur, CVC Turismo and Nascimento Turismo. Club Vip is owned by José Manuel Antunes of Whitejets and Omni Aviation of Portugal, controller of the Portuguese charter airline White Airways.

Whitejets received its authorization to operate flights on March 5, 2010 and operated its first flight on June 12, 2010 between Rio de Janeiro-Galeão, Campinas-Viracopos and Varadero, Cuba.

By the end of 2011 Whitejets planned to start operating regular flights on the route Rio de Janeiro-Galeão / São Paulo-Guarulhos / Recife, while maintaining its charter operations. These plans however were never materialized.

On March 13, 2013, the airline announced that its name would change to POP Brasil and that as of April 16, 2013 it would start operating as a regular charter airline, pending on the necessary government authorizations.

However, on September 23, 2013, the Whitejets single aircraft, an Airbus A320-214 registration PR-WTB, was returned to its owner, White Airways, making unsure the future for the airline. Furthermore, the project to operate scheduled flights and change its name to POP Linhas Aéreas was also abandoned.

The airline ceased operations in 2014.

== Destinations ==
Whitejets operated charter passenger services contracted by tour operators, usually departing from Campinas-Viracopos, Rio de Janeiro-Galeão and São Paulo-Guarulhos.

== Fleet ==
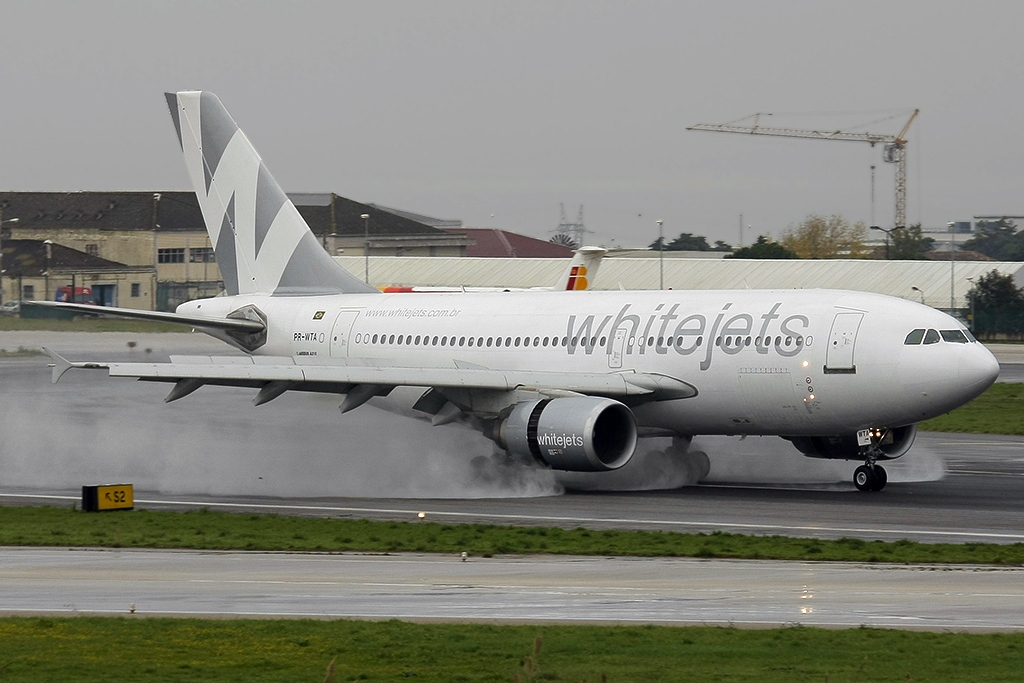
An Airbus A310 Whitejets

As of September 2013 the fleet of Whitejets included no aircraft:

Retired Whitejets fleet
Aircraft	Total	Years of operation
Airbus A310-304	3	2010 – 2012
Airbus A320-214	1	2010 – 2013

== See also ==
- List of defunct airlines of Brazil
