= Groundforce Portugal =

- Company type: Subsidiary
- Industry: Ground Handling Industry
- Founded: Lisbon (2005)
- Headquarters: TAP Portugal Headquarters, Lisbon, Portugal
- Area served: Portugal
- Key people: Paulo Neto Leite (CEO)
- Products: Aircraft ground handling
- Owner: Public
- Number of employees: 2,300, as of December 2014
- Parent: TAP Portugal
- Website: http://www.groundforce.pt

Groundforce Portugal is a subsidiary company of TAP Air Portugal, offering aircraft ground handling services in Portugal. It was created with the privatization of the ground handling services of airline TAP Air Portugal in October 2005.

== History ==
In 1982 the DOT (Department of Land Operations) was the one who took care of handling in Portugal. Seven years later (in 1989), that entity underwent a process of organizational restructuring and has changed its name to General Directorate of Operations on Land (DGOT). In 1992, an expansion and provision of services to third strategy, TAP Handling emerged.

In April 2003, due to the separation of TAP SGPS and TAP SA responsible for the new company arose handling in Portugal called SPdH (Serviços Portugueses de Handling, SA). SPdH This proved to be an undertaking of great importance in relation to civil aviation in Portugal due to the quality of its ground handling services in major national airports. Yet, in 2003, Portugalia Airlines assured 6% of the capital of SPdH. Meanwhile, SPdH began a process of privatization by selling 50.1% of its capital to the Group GLOBALIA, which by itself is the biggest tourist company in Spain.

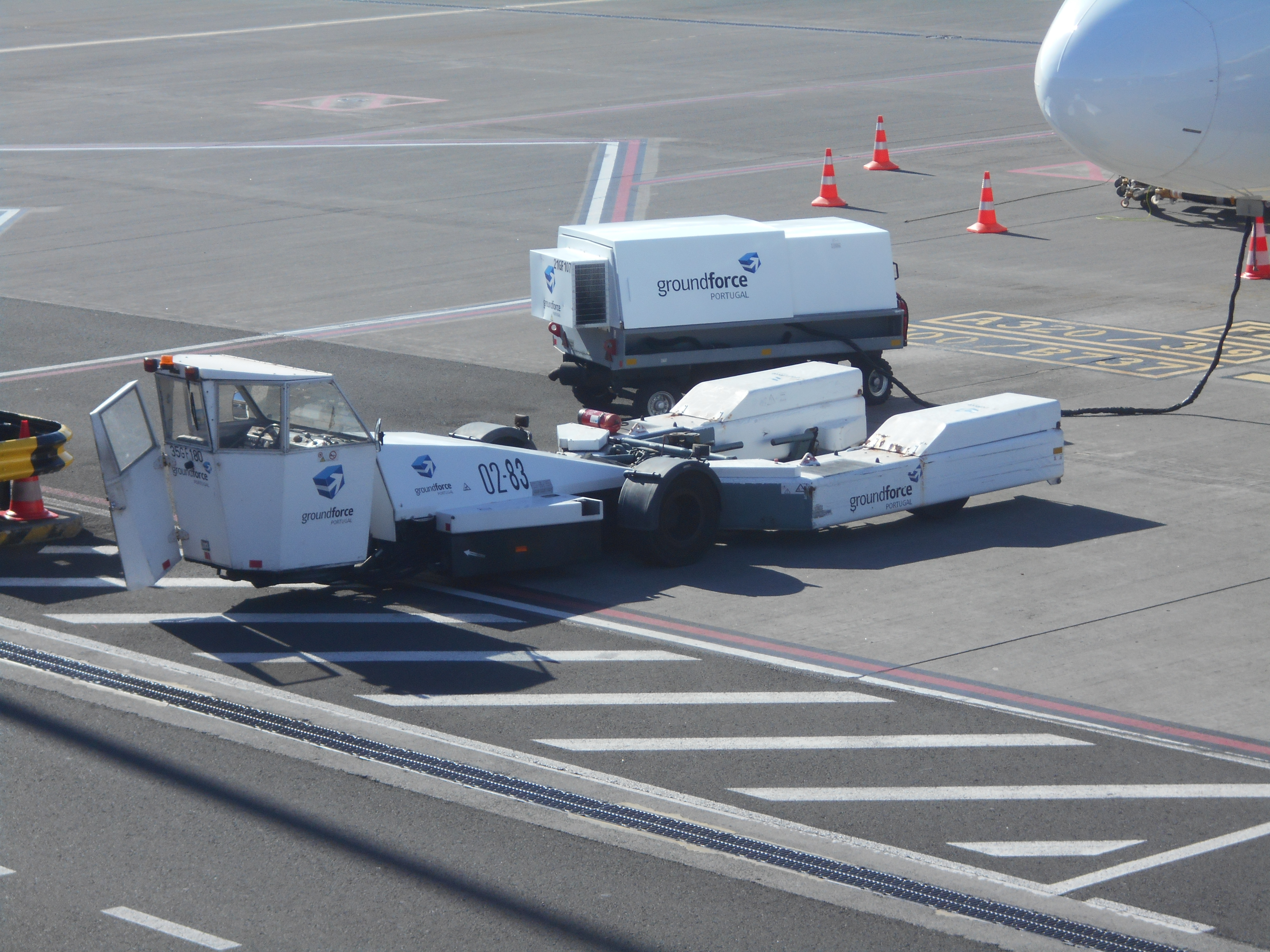
Groundforce's barless pushback tractor in 2018, at Madeira Airport.

Groundforce was born in October 2005 through the unification of the companies GLOBALIA Handling - Division of airport ground handling services of Globalia Group. The companies were: Iberhandling, Eurohandling, MarHandling Globalia Handling and Mexico. There currently exists Groundforce in Portugal, Mexico, Morocco and Spain.

In March 2008, a partnership of three national banks (BIG, Banif and Invest) acquired the position held by GLOBALIA Group, i.e., bought the 50.1% of the capital of Groundforce Portugal. According to the statement of Groundforce, BIG got 19.94% (for 12 million euros), Banif with 15.1% (9 million) and Banco Invest with the other 15.1% (9 million). Therefore, Groundforce Portugal became a 100% national entity.

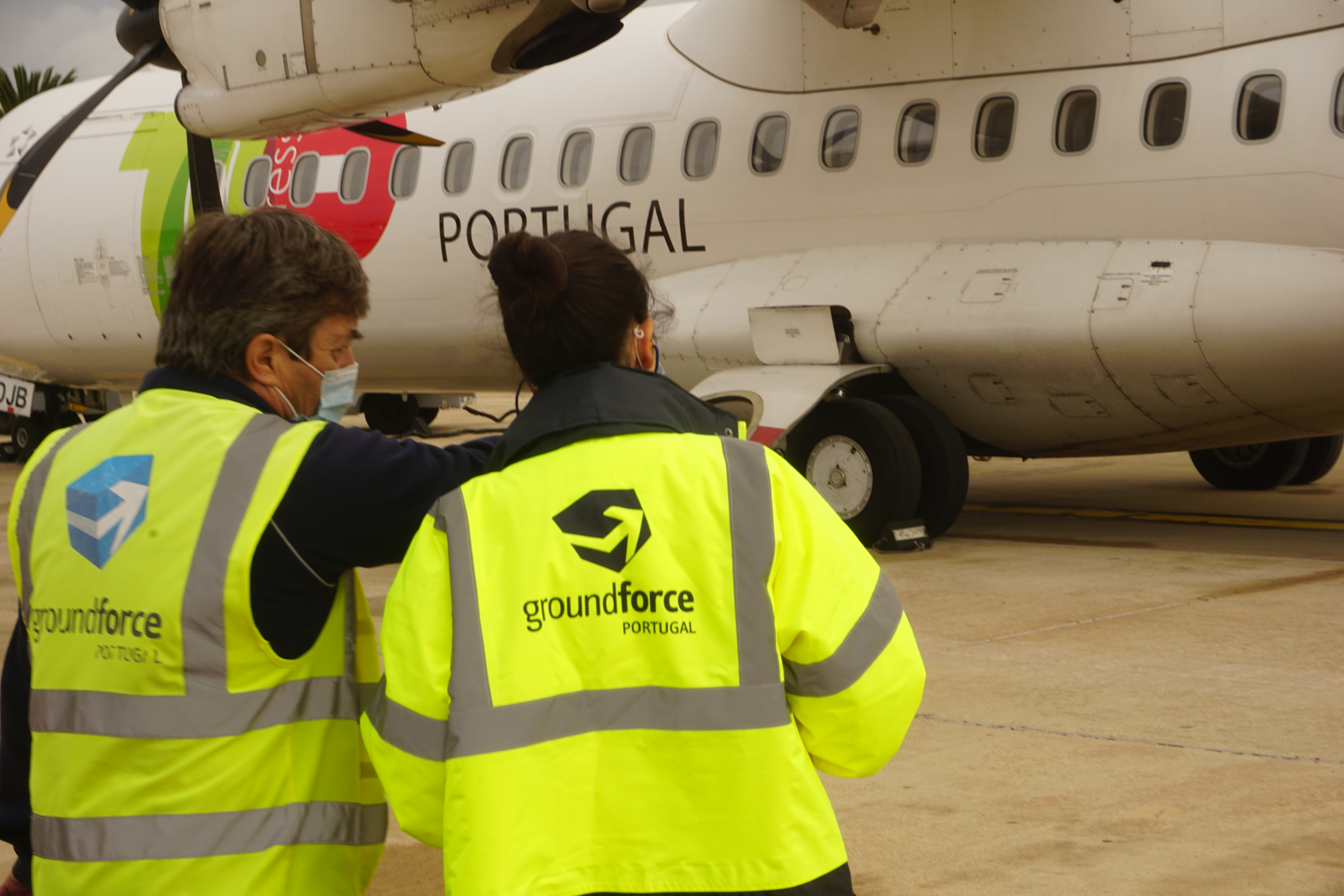
Groundforce personnel near a ATR 72 of TAP Express at Faro Airport, 2020.

Groundforce Portugal ceased activity at Faro airport in Faro on 10 November 2010, ending the scale at the airport and firing 336 staff employees. Annual losses in the order of €8 million on this scale were the reasons given by the company management.

== Ground handling ==
Groundforce Portugal employs over 2,000 people who handle passenger, cargo, ramp and technical services for airlines at Lisbon Portela Airport. Globally, Groundforce Portugal also provides airport services to 4 airports:

- Portugal — Lisbon, the Francisco de Sá Carneiro Airport in Porto, the Madeira Airport in Funchal and the Porto Santo Airport on the Porto Santo Island.
