= Air Atlantis =

Portuguese charter airline

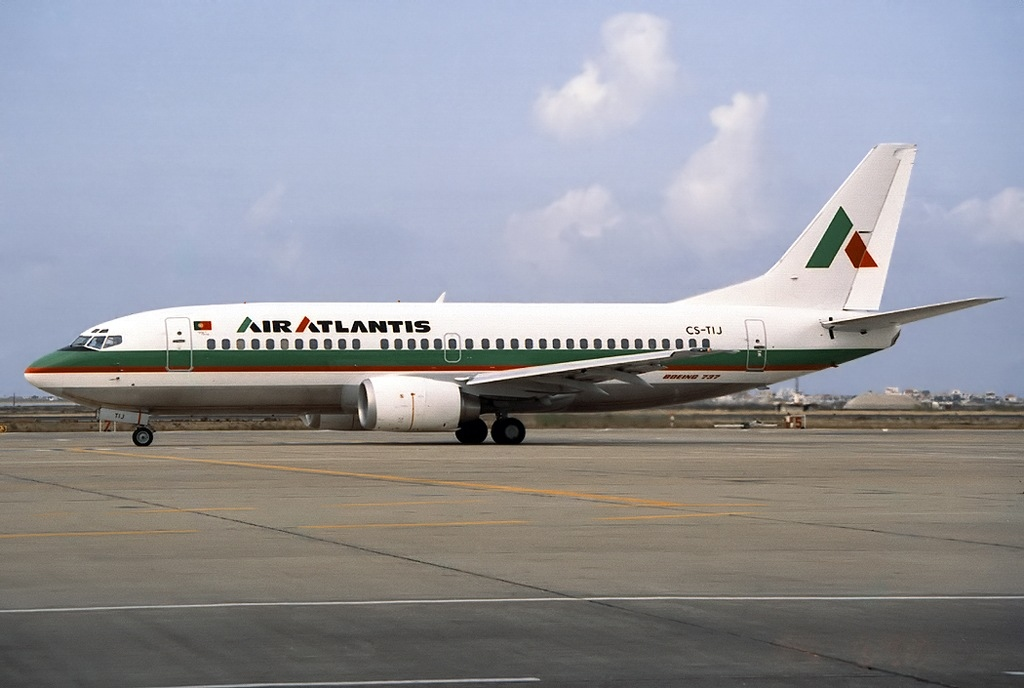
IATA	ICAO	Call sign
EJ	AIA	AIR ATLANTIS
- Founded: May 1985
- Ceased operations: April 30, 1993
- Hubs: Faro Airport
- Fleet size: 9 (1993)
- Parent company: TAP Air Portugal
- Headquarters: Lisbon, Portugal

Air Atlantis was a Portuguese charter airline wholly owned by TAP Air Portugal to provide leisure flights to most European cities.

== History ==
The airline began operations in May 1985 using a Boeing 707 and a Boeing 737-200. By the next year, these aircraft were replaced with Boeing 727s, which were the first aircraft painted in the new airline's livery. The 727s were replaced by Boeing 737-200 and brand new Boeing 737-300 from 1988 onwards.

Charter flights were flown from Amsterdam, Stockholm, Dublin, Birmingham, Bristol, Brussels, Copenhagen, Düsseldorf, Exeter, Frankfurt, Glasgow, Hamburg, London, Manchester, Munich, Newcastle, Stuttgart, and Zurich to points in Portugal, but mostly Faro.

By early 1993, TAP Air Portugal decided to restructure its operations, and Air Atlantis was dissolved on April 30, 1993.

== Fleet ==
Air Atlantis fleet
Aircraft	Total	Introduced	Retired	Notes
Boeing 707-320B	2	1985	1987	Leased from TAP Air Portugal.
Boeing 727-100	2	1985	1989	Leased from TAP Air Portugal.
Boeing 727-200	3	1987	1989	
Boeing 737-200	6	1985	1993	3 leased from TAP Air Portugal.
Boeing 737-300	6	1988	1993	

== See also ==
- List of defunct airlines of Portugal
