= PGA Express =

Regional airline of Portugal (2001–2015)

IATA	ICAO	Call sign
OC	—	—
- Founded: 2001
- Ceased operations: April 2015
- Hubs: Humberto Delgado Airport
- Frequent-flyer program: TAP Victoria
- Alliance: Star Alliance (affiliate; 2005–2015)
- Parent company: Portugália Airlines
- Headquarters: Cascais, Portugal

PGA Express was a Portuguese regional airline based in Cascais at Cascais Municipal Airport. It was a subsidiary of Portugália (or PGA for short) and therefore also TAP Air Portugal and used to operate services to Spain in a franchise agreement with both of them.

On 21 March 2014, TAP Portugal announced it would buy two ATR 42-600 for Portugália to replace their two smaller Beechcraft 1900D operated by PGA Express. However, White Airways now operates both ATRs on behalf of TAP Air Portugal instead of PGA Express leaving PGA Express' current status unclear as it no longer maintains any flight operations.

== Fleet ==
As of April 2015, the PGA Express does no longer operate any aircraft as both Beechcraft 1900D have been phased out while their replacement is not operated by PGA Express.
