= Air Columbus =

1989–1994 Portuguese charter airline

IATA	ICAO	Call sign
BO	CNB	AIR COLUMBUS
- Founded: 1988
- Commenced operations: 1989
- Ceased operations: 1994
- Operating bases: Funchal
- Hubs: Faro, Funchal
- Secondary hubs: Lisbon, Porto

Air Columbus was a charter airline based in Portugal, which was operational between 1989 and 1994.

== History ==
The airline was in the air by October 1989. The Danish charter airline, Sterling Airways (1962–1993) was one of the owners behind Air Columbus, One being Mr. R Morsi. Two Boeing 727 (OY-SAS, OY-SAU), was placed in traffic with the airline in Portugal. One of the main airports was Funchal, Madeira.

The airline was flying to the Nordic countries of Norway, Sweden, Denmark and Finland. It also did flights to London Heathrow, Düsseldorf, Stuttgart, Bristol Airport and Jersey.

In 1992 the fleet was supplied with two Boeing 737-300, adopted from Norway Airlines Charter. In 1994 three more Boeing 737-300 was added to the fleet.

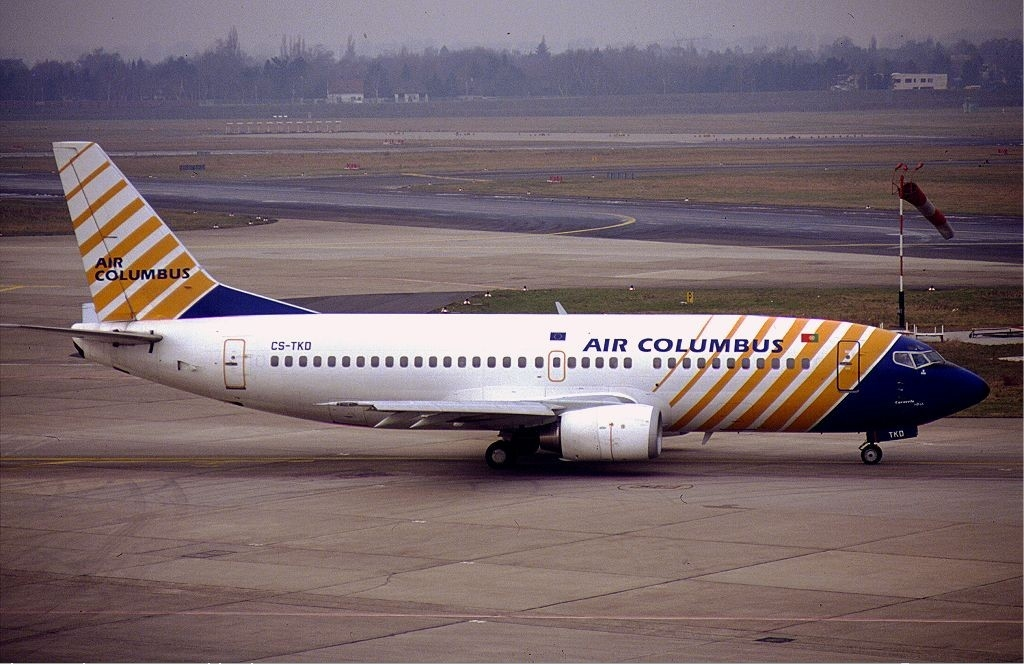
Air Columbus Boeing 737-300.

== Fleet ==
The Air Columbus fleet grew to consist of 2 Boeing 727 and 5 Boeing 737-300 aircraft.

Aircraft type	Registrations
Boeing 727-200	CS-TKA, CS-TKB
Boeing 737-300	CS-TKC, TKD, TKE, TKF, TKG
