= Portugália Airlines =

Regional airline of Portugal

IATA	ICAO	Call sign
NI	PGA	PORTUGALIA AiRLINES
- Founded: 25 July 1988
- Commenced operations: 7 July 1990
- Hubs: Humberto Delgado Airport
- Focus cities: Francisco Sá Carneiro Airport
- Frequent-flyer program: Qualiflyer (1992–2002); TAP Victoria; Miles and Go
- Subsidiaries: PGA Express (2001–2015)
- Parent company: TAP Air Portugal
- Website: www.portugalia-airlines.pt

Portugália - Companhia Portuguesa de Transportes Aéreos, S.A., also simply known as Portugália Airlines or PGA, is a regional airline that has been part of the TAP Group since 2007, based in Lisbon, Portugal. Founded in 1988 as an independent air transport company, it operates domestic and international flights from Lisbon and Porto under the TAP Express brand, using Embraer 190/195 aircraft.

Between 2001 and 2006, PGA was recognized by Skytrax as the Best Regional Airline in Europe. In 2017, it received the Best Airline of the Year award from the European Regions Airline Association.

In 2016, following a strategy to standardize the passenger experience, the TAP Express brand was announced, replacing the PGA – Portugália Airlines brand.

== History ==
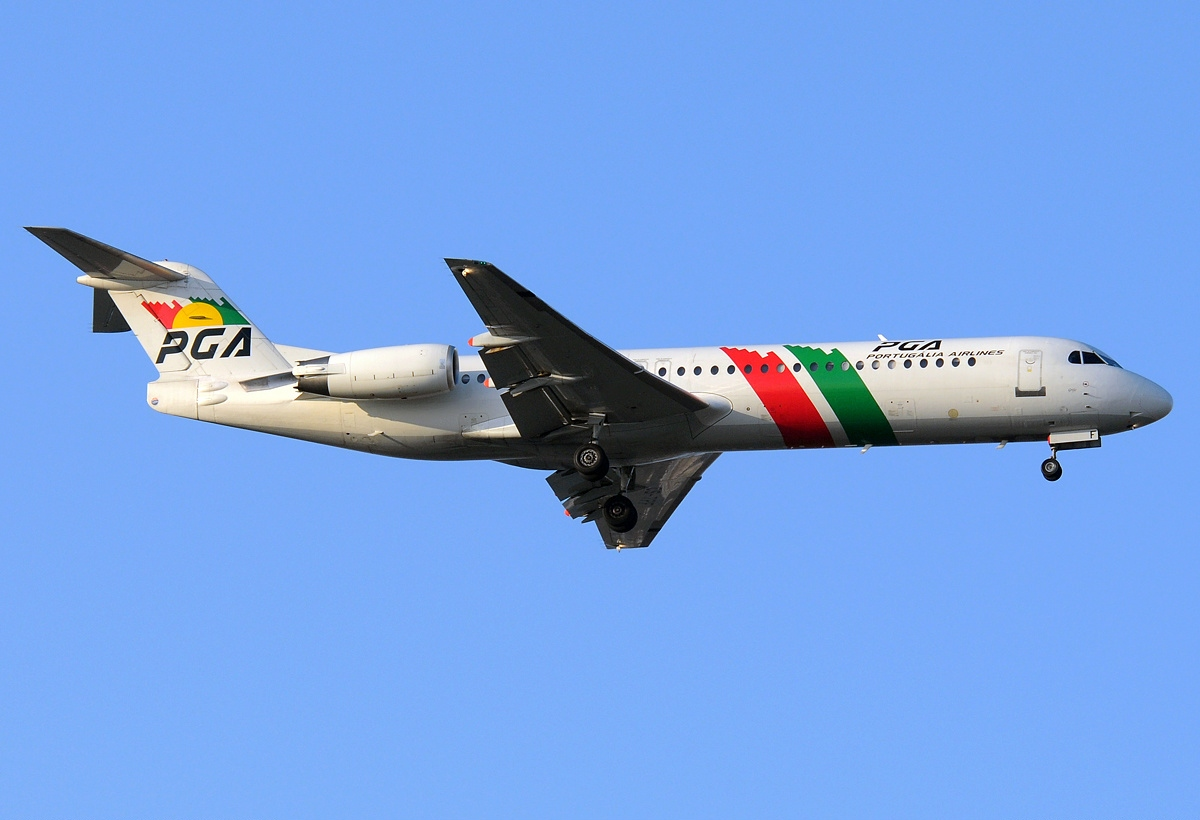
Portugália Fokker 100

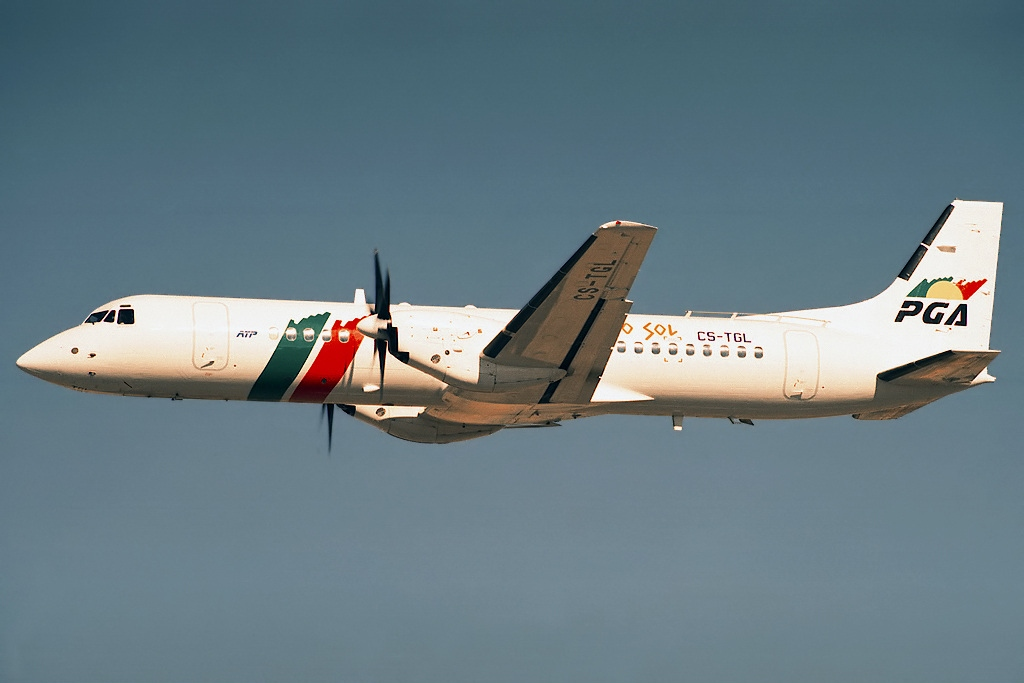
Portugália BAe ATP

=== Early years ===
The airline was established on 25 July 1988 as a joint-stock company, but had to wait two years before it could start services, due to a delay in air transport liberalization. It started operations on 7 July 1990 with a flight from Lisbon to Porto. It also flew from Lisbon to Faro that same day. It started operations with scheduled domestic and international charter flights, as scheduled international flights were not then permitted under Portuguese legislation. International scheduled flights started in June 1992 from Lisbon and Porto.

The company's first airplanes were Fokker 100s, and since the late 1990s it has also purchased eight Embraer 145s, becoming the main competitor of state flag carrier TAP Air Portugal. Operating in the regional market, Portugália focused its operations in domestic routes, as well as on destinations in Spain, France, Italy, Germany and Morocco.

The company's fleet stabilized in 2000 with 14 aircraft (6 Fokker 100 and 8 Embraer 145). Portugália developed its own maintenance services since its earliest days, however it only managed to have its own Hangar and to increase its base maintenance capabilities as of 2005 with the opening of its Hangar at Lisbon Portela Airport. Performing most of its Fokker and Embraer maintenance in house, Portugália managed to significantly improve its results.

Portugália received the title of Best Regional Airline in Europe in 2001, 2002, 2003, 2004 and 2005, the Skytrax Award for Best Cabin Staff in Europe in 2005 and 2006, and for Best Cabin Staff in Southern Europe in 2007.

=== Integration into TAP Air Portugal Group ===
On 6 November 2006, TAP and Portugalia owners Grupo Espirito Santo, announced TAP's acquisition of 99.81% of Portugalia shares, subject to approval by the regulatory authorities. It had 750 employees (at March 2007). Portugalia was a candidate to join the SkyTeam Alliance in 2006 but since then joined under Star Alliance after the acquisition by TAP Air Portugal.

With the acquisition by TAP Air Portugal Group, it undertook a new business model. The company stopped working independently and started working within a group logic as a supplier of flight capacity by hiring its aircraft to TAP Air Portugal. Fernando Pinto, president & CEO of TAP Air Portugal said that the airline's regional subsidiary, Portugália Airlines, is "important to the TAP results as it brings very important passengers from small cities to long distance services.", during European Regional Airlines Association 2012 conference in Porto.

On 21 March 2014, TAP Air Portugal announced that it would buy two ATR 42-600 for its subsidiary company Portugália replacing the smaller Beechcraft 1900D previously operated by PGA Express. However, White Airways now operates the ATRs family on behalf of TAP Air Portugal instead of Portugália.

=== Rebranding to TAP Express ===
On 14 January 2016, TAP Air Portugal announced that Portugália would be rebranded as TAP Express as of 27 March 2016 as part of the restructuring measures within the group.. The division Portugália Airlines however was said to stay independent within the group.

On the same day, TAP Air Portugal also announced that the entire Portugália fleet consisting of Fokker 100 and Embraer ERJ-145 would be replaced by July 2016 with new Embraer 190 and ATR 72-600 aircraft (the latter operated by White Airways on behalf of TAP), which received a livery similar to that of TAP Air Portugal albeit wearing Express titles.

== Destinations ==
Portugália operated within the route network of TAP Express.
