= White Airways =

Portuguese airline

IATA	ICAO	Call sign
WI	WHT	WHITEJET
- Founded: 2000 (as Yes)
- Commenced operations: 2005
- Hubs: Lisbon Airport
- Fleet size: 1
- Destinations: Charter / ACMI
- Parent company: Omni Aviation
- Headquarters: Oeiras, Portugal
- Website: www.flywhite.com

White Airways S.A. (also known as White) is a Portuguese charter airline and ACMI airline headquartered in Porto Salvo, Oeiras.

== History ==
The airline was founded in 2000, originally as Yes - Linhas Aéreas Charter under a joint venture with TAP Air Portugal (75%) and Abreu Group (25%). It commenced operations in June 2000 with a leased Lockheed L-1011-500.

In late 2006, the airline was acquired by the Omni Aviation and renamed White Airways. It focused on carrying out ACMI operations on behalf of other airlines.

In May 2016, White Airways phased out their last Airbus A310-300 as one of the last European operators of the type.

In October 2022, TAP Air Portugal announced it would end its wetlease contract with White Airways, citing insufficient dispatch reliability. This was later disputed by White Airways, as the maintenance was performed by Portugália, a subsidiary of TAP itself.

== Fleet ==
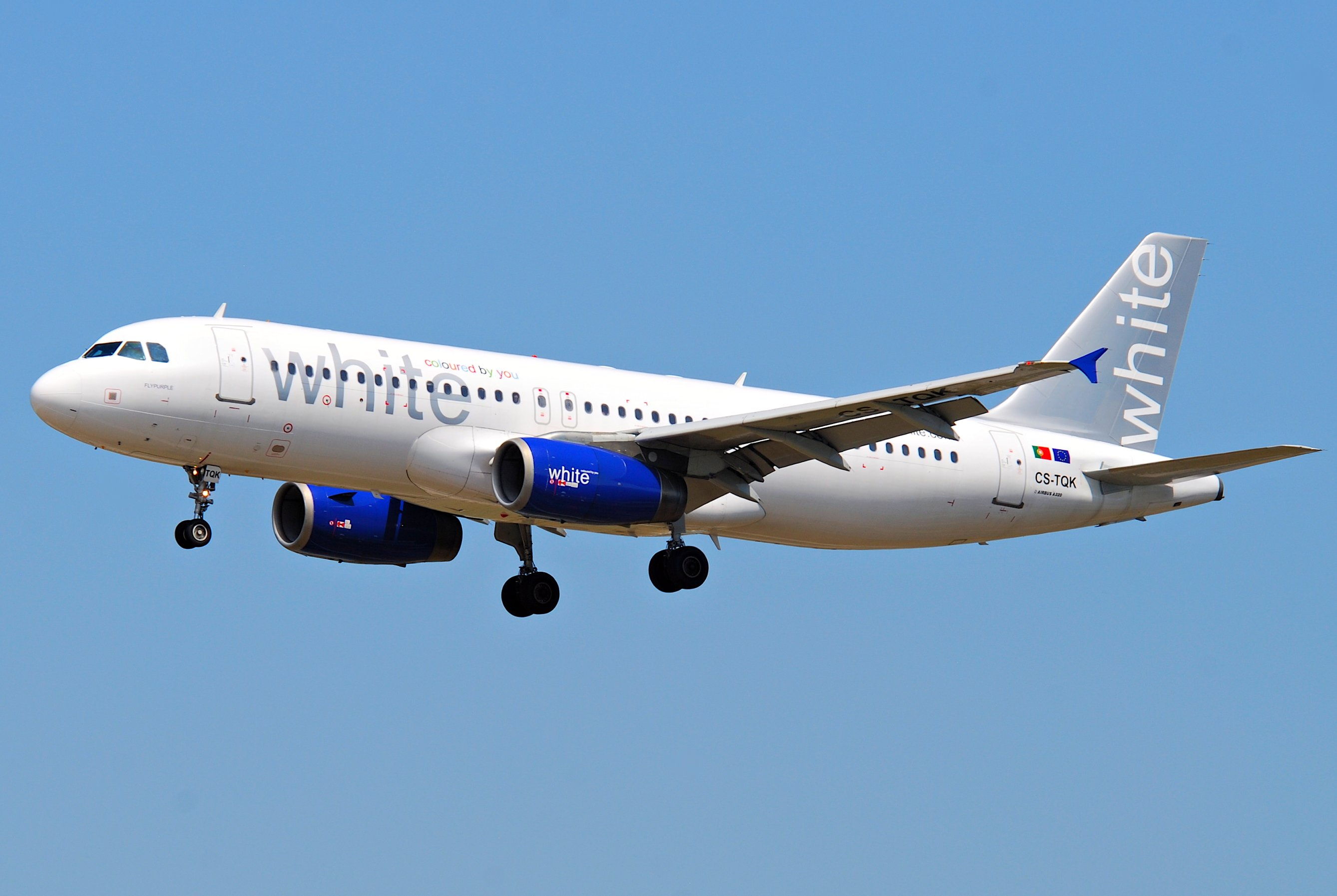
White Airways Airbus A320-200

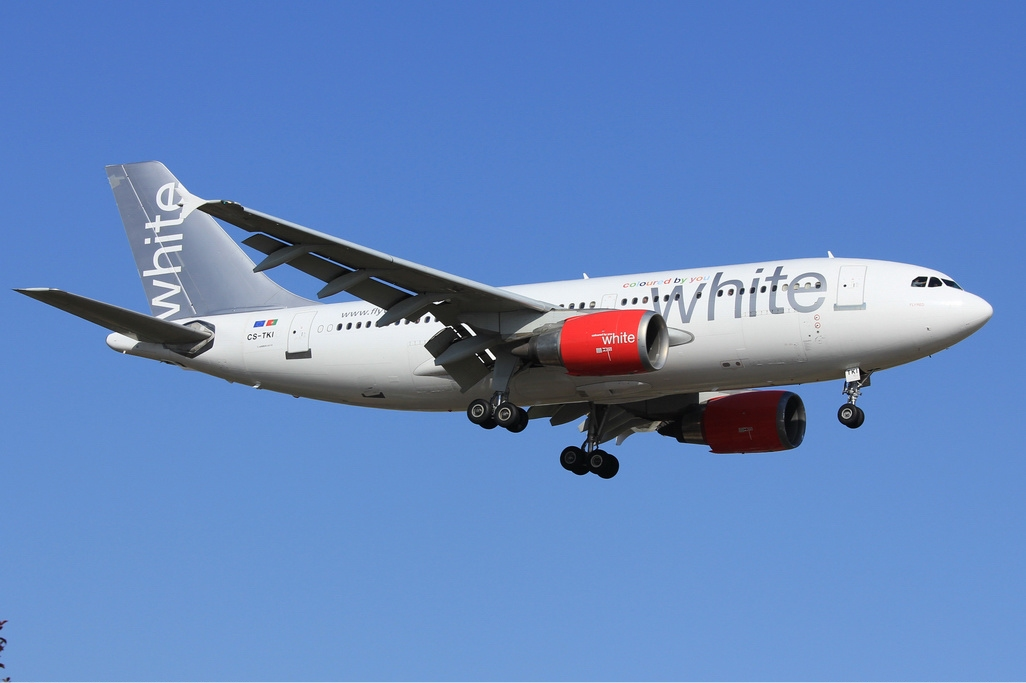
A former White Airways Airbus A310-300

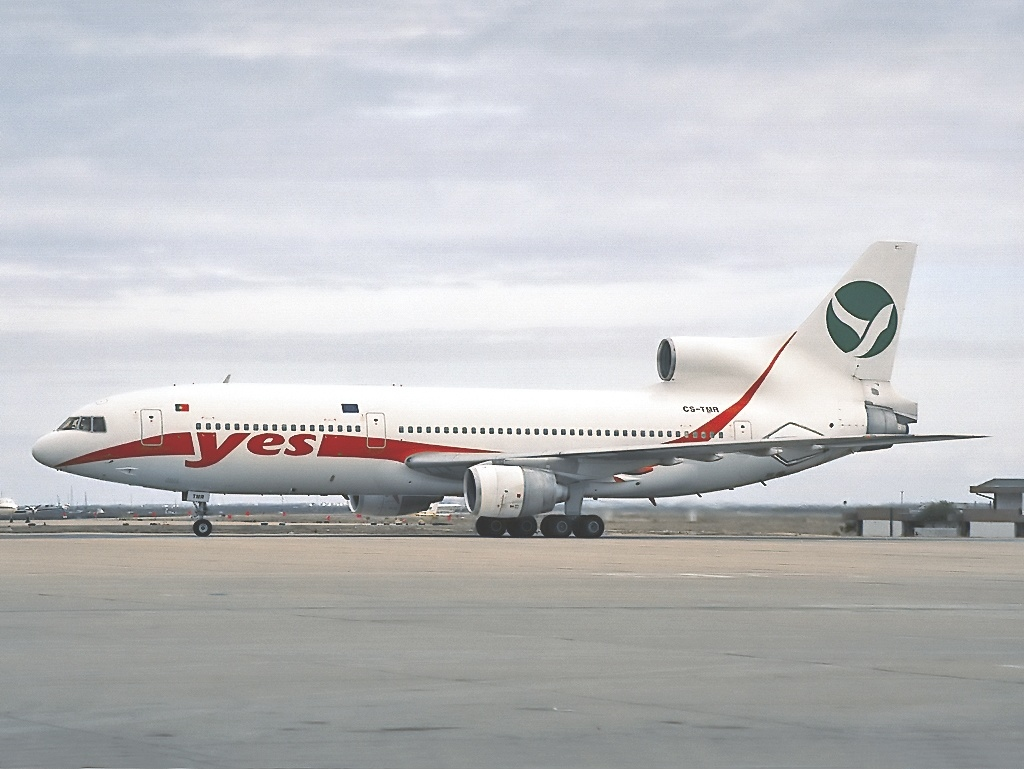
A Yes Lockheed L-1011-500 parked at Faro Airport in 2001

=== Current fleet ===
As of April 2026, the White fleet consists of the following aircraft:

White Airways fleet
Aircraft	Total	Orders	Passengers				Notes
Aircraft	Total	Orders	F	J	Y	Total	Notes
Airbus A320-200	1	—	—	—	180	180	
Total	1						

=== Former fleet ===
White Airways former fleet
Aircraft	Total	Introduced	Retired	Notes
Airbus ACJ319	1			
Airbus A310-300	3	2010	2016	
Airbus A319-100	1			
Airbus A321-200	1	2018	2018	Operated for Galistair
Airbus A330-200	1	2007	2007	Leased from XL Airways France
ATR 42-600	2	2014	2016	Operated for Portugália Airlines
ATR 72-500	1	2014	2014	Operated for Portugália Airlines
ATR 72-500	1	2017	2018	Operated for TAP Express
ATR 72-600	8	2016	2022	Operated for TAP Express
Boeing 767-300ER	1	2004	2004	Leased from Icelandair
Boeing 777-200LR	1	2012	2025	operated for CEIBA Intercontinental
Lockheed L-1011-500	2	2000	2005	One leased from Air Luxor

== Accidents and incidents ==
- On July 6, 2018, an ATR 72-600 (registered CS-DJG) operated on behalf of TAP Express made a hard landing at Fès–Saïs Airport, during which the tail impacted the runway. The aircraft made a return flight to Lisbon an hour later with 55 passengers on board, with the captain apparently failing to notice visible damage to the tail during the pre-flight walkaround. While there were no injuries, the final report of the Portuguese Aviation Accidents Prevention and Investigation Department criticized both the flight crew and the operator for their shortcomings during the landing, organisational culture, failure to conduct an effective pre-flight inspection before the return flight, and failure to make a legally required report of the accident.

== See also ==
- List of airlines of Portugal
