= TAP Express =

Regional airline brand of Portugal

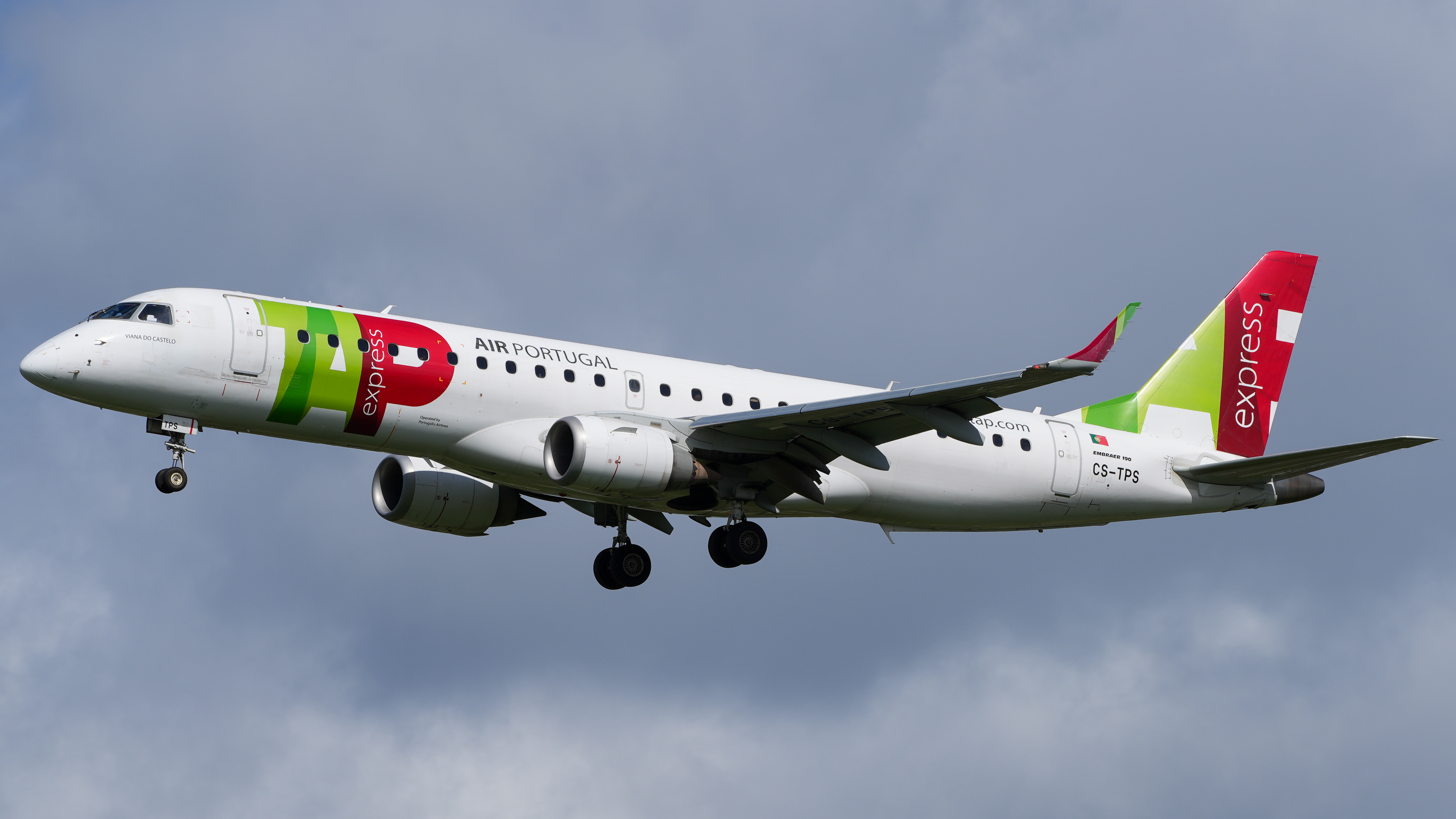
- Embraer E190
IATA	ICAO	Call sign
TP	TAP	PORTUGAL EXPRESS
- Founded: 2016; 10 years ago
- Hubs: Lisbon Airport
- Focus cities: Porto Airport
- Frequent-flyer program: TAP Miles&Go
- Alliance: Star Alliance (affiliate)
- Fleet size: 19
- Destinations: 23
- Parent company: TAP Air Portugal
- Headquarters: Lisbon, Portugal
- Key people: Antoanaldo Neves, CEO; Miguel Frasquilho, Chairman
- Website: flytap.com

TAP Express (TAP standing for Transportes Aéreos Portugueses) is a Portuguese virtual carrier and regional airline brand name for TAP Air Portugal which operates short and medium-haul routes. Its head office is on the grounds of Lisbon Portela Airport in Lisbon. Currently, Portugália Airlines operates under the TAP Express brand.

== History ==
On 14 January 2016, TAP Portugal announced that Portugália Airlines, its regional subsidiary, was rebranded TAP Express on 27 March 2016, as part of the restructuring measures within the group, even though the company still operates as a wholly owned company of TAP Air Portugal. Mainline carriers often use regional airlines to operate services in order to increase frequency, serve routes that would not sustain larger aircraft, or for other competitive reasons.

Also on 14 January 2016, TAP Air Portugal also announced that the entire Portugália fleet consisting of Fokker 100 and Embraer ERJ-145 would be replaced by July 2016 with new Embraer 190 and ATR 72-600 aircraft (the latter operated by White Airways), which received a livery similar to that of TAP Portugal. White Airways, an airline owned by Omni Aviation, operated for TAP Express until 2022.

== Fleet ==
=== Current fleet ===
As of January 2025, the TAP Express fleet consists of the following aircraft:

TAP Express Fleet
Aircraft	In service	Orders	Passengers			Notes
Aircraft	In service	Orders	C	Y	Total	Notes
Embraer 190	12	—	—	106	106	Operated by Portugália Airlines
Embraer 195	7	—	—	118	118	Operated by Portugália Airlines
Total	19	—				

=== Former fleet ===
TAP Express formerly operated these aircraft:

Aircraft	Introduced	Retired	Notes
ATR 72	2016	2022	Operated by White Airways
Embraer ERJ 145	2016	2016	Operated by Portugália Airlines
Fokker 100	2016	2016	Operated by Portugália Airlines
