= TAP Air Portugal =

National airline of Portugal

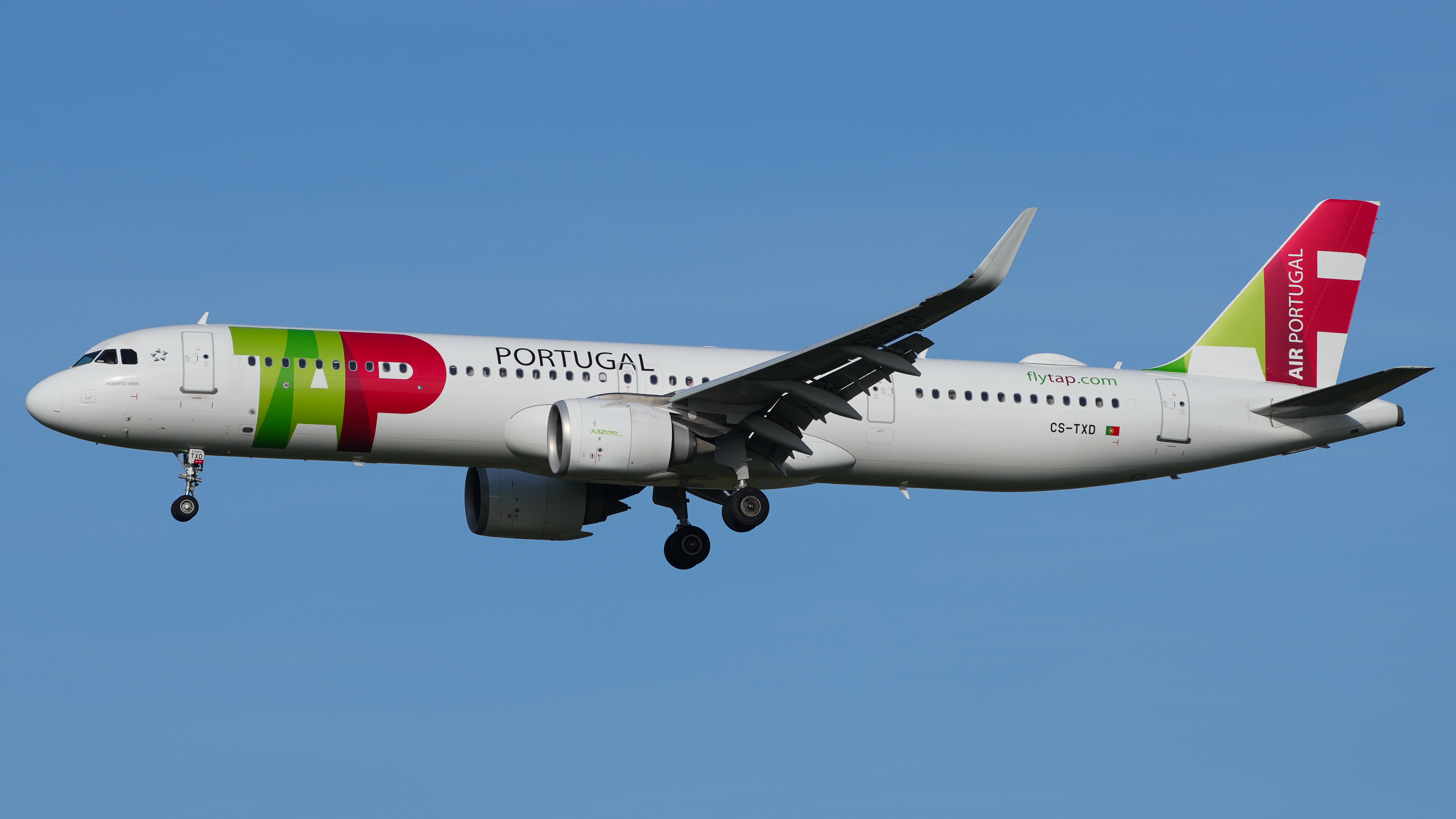
- TAP Air Portugal Airbus A321LR
IATA	ICAO	Call sign
TP	TAP	AIR PORTUGAL
- Founded: 14 March 1945; 81 years ago (as Transportes Aéreos Portugueses)
- Commenced operations: 19 September 1946; 80 years ago
- Hubs: Lisbon Airport
- Secondary hubs: Porto Airport
- Focus cities: Madeira Airport
- Frequent-flyer program: TAP Miles&Go
- Alliance: Star Alliance
- Subsidiaries: TAP Express
- Fleet size: 94
- Destinations: 87 (incl. TAP Express)
- Headquarters: Lisbon, Portugal
- Key people: Luís Rodrigues (CEO)
- Revenue: ▲€ 4.2 billion (2023)
- Operating income: ▲€ 871 million (2023)
- Net income: ▲€ 177 million (2023)
- Total equity: ▲€ -468 million (2021)
- Employees: 6,626
- Website: www.flytap.com

TAP Air Portugal, formally Transportes Aéreos Portugueses (TAP), is the flag carrier of Portugal, headquartered at Lisbon Airport, which also serves as its main hub. Founded in 1945, the airline began commercial services the following year. It has been a member of Star Alliance since 2005.

TAP operates flights to destinations across Europe, the Americas, Africa, and Asia, with a particular focus on routes connecting Portugal with Brazil, Lusophone African countries, and other Portuguese-speaking markets. Its fleet consists entirely of Airbus aircraft, with regional services operated under the brand TAP Express using Embraer jets.

Throughout its history, TAP has alternated between public and private ownership. The airline was sold to a private consortium in 2015, before the Portuguese state gradually reasserted control, renationalising in 2020. The Portuguese government subsequently announced plans to reprivatise the airline, a process which drew scrutiny from the Portuguese Court of Audits.

== History ==
=== Establishment and early operations ===
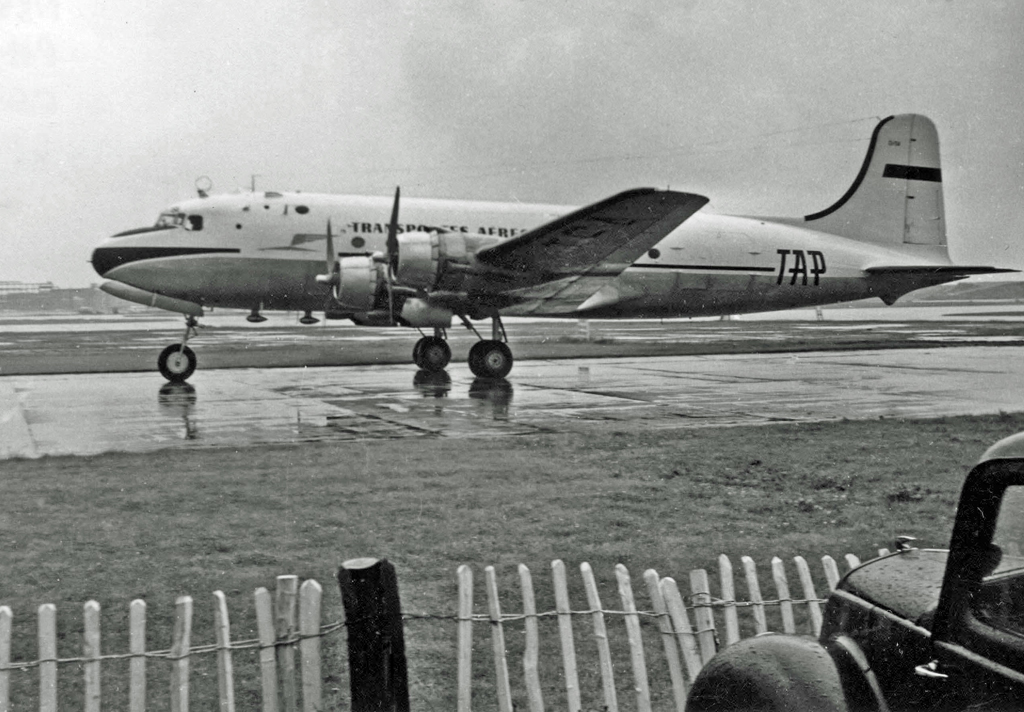
Douglas DC-4 of TAP arriving at London Heathrow Airport from Lisbon in 1954

On 14 March 1945, the airline was founded as state-owned company with the name Transportes Aéreos Portugueses (Portuguese Air Transportation) and operated under the jurisdiction of the Portuguese Civil Aviation Office. Later that same year, it took delivery of its first aircraft, a pair of Douglas DC-3s. The airline began commercial services on 19 September 1946, performing an inaugural flight from Lisbon to Madrid, carrying a total of 11 passengers on one of its DC-3s. On 31 December 1946, TAP began its Linha Aérea Imperial, a twelve-stop colonial service including Luanda, Angola and Lourenço Marques (now Maputo), Mozambique. It covered 24.450 kilometres (15.193 mi; 13.202 nmi) within 15 days (both ways), making it the longest air service operated with twin-engine airliners at that time. To suit the tropical conditions at most of these destinations, a special uniform was adopted, comprising khaki shirts with either skirts or shorts.

In 1947, the airline launched its first domestic services, commencing a route between Lisbon and Porto, as well as another international route between São Tomé and London. That same year, a total of four Douglas DC-4 Skymasters were purchased; these reportedly remained in the airline's service as late as 1960. These were used on the routes to Africa and to major European destinations, including London. During 1948, new services to Seville and Paris were launched.

=== Privatisation ===
During 1953, the airline was privatised for the first time in its history, reorganising from a public service to a public limited company (plc); that same year, it commenced new services to Tangier and Casablanca. During late 1955, several Lockheed Super Constellation four-engined pressurised airliners were acquired; these were immediately introduced on the TAP African scheduled services to Luanda and Lourenço Marques. The Super Constellation was credited with noticeably reducing flight times over prior airliners on its routes.

During 1955, the airline broke new ground with a successful long-distance experimental transatlantic trip to Rio de Janeiro, Brazil. On this flight, as a passenger, was the Portuguese aviator and cartographer Carlos Viegas Gago Coutinho. By the end of the decade, the firm had attained several milestones, including the carriage of 64,000 passengers, its fleet performing 10,000 hours of flight, a route network spanning 14,000 km, while also employing over 1,000 members of staff.

Beginning in 1960, TAP launched Rio de Janeiro as its first destination in Brazil, in a jointly-operated air service named "Voo da Amizade" ("Friendship Flight") with Panair do Brasil (1960–1965) and Varig (1965–1967). A route from Lisbon to Goa, a 19-hour flight with five stopovers, was added to the network during 1961.

=== The jet era – mid-1960s onwards ===
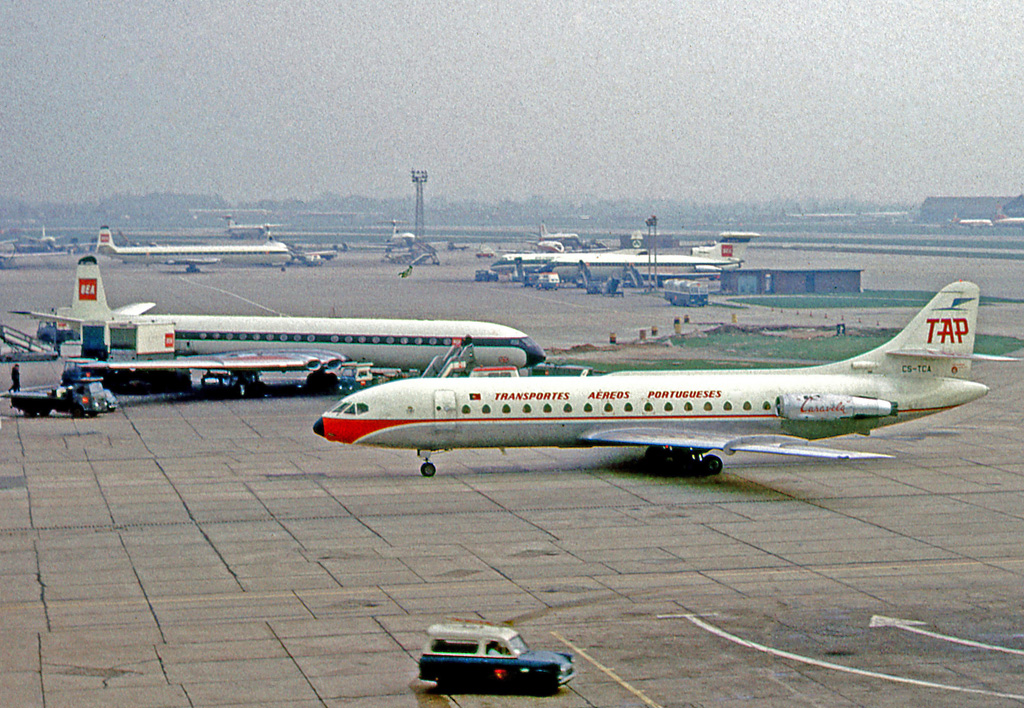
Sud Aviation Caravelle VI-R of TAP at London Heathrow Airport in 1966

During July 1962, TAP entered the jet era, having procured an initial batch of three French-built Sud Aviation Caravelle, an early twin-jet airliner. These were first operated upon the airline's most competitive European routes. That same year, new services were launched between Lisbon and Las Palmas, as well as Santa Maria in the Azores. During 1963, additional European routes, serving Geneva, Munich, and Frankfurt, commenced.

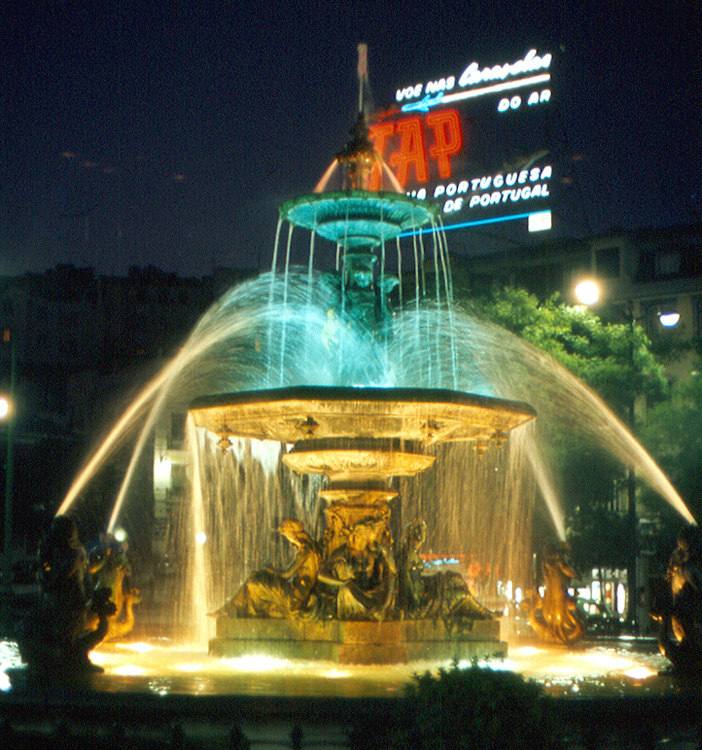
Rossio Square, Lisbon, in June 1968, showing a TAP advertisement in the background at night

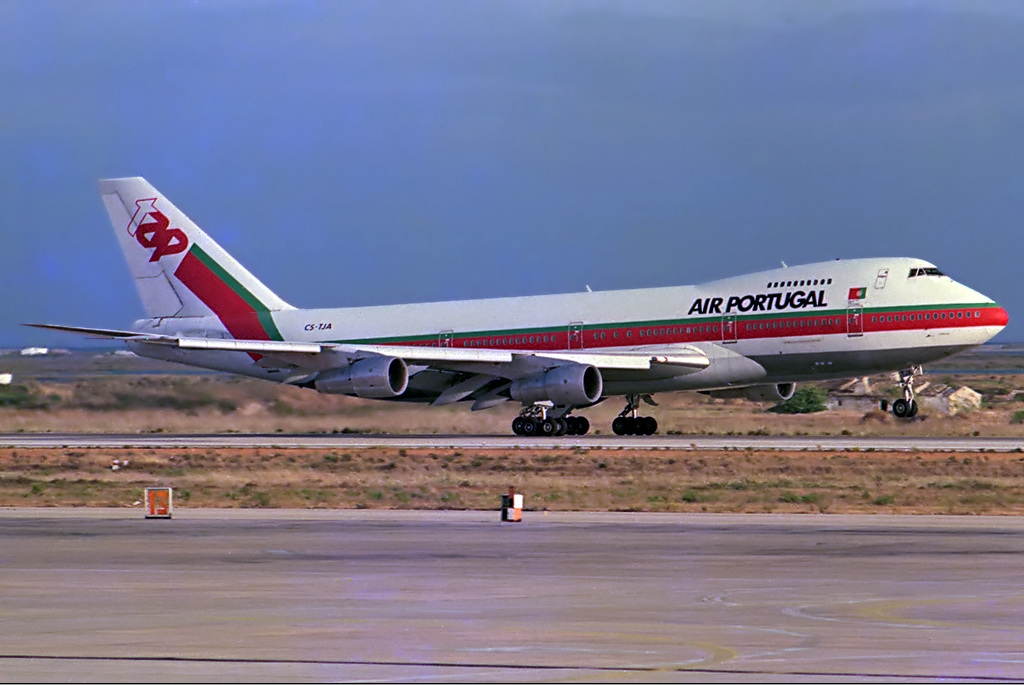
TAP Boeing 747-200B in 1984

On 19 June 1964, the one-millionth passenger was carried by the airline, broadly 18 years following the commencement of operations. During the following year, TAP procured its first Boeing-built jetliner, the 707. Two years later, it would be followed by the short-haul Boeing 727. On 17 June 1966, TAP operated its first sole flight to Brazil, one of its 707s landed at Galeão Airport in Rio de Janeiro at precisely at the same time and on the same day as when the hydroplane Santa Cruz moored in Guanabara Bay in 1922, when Sacadura Cabral and Gago Coutinho made their historic South Atlantic crossing. The route to Brazil was inaugurated.

In 1967, the airline achieved a milestone: it became the first European airline to fly exclusively with jets. In 1969, service to New York City via Santa Maria Island began; two years later, Boston was added to the New York service. During 1971, the airline opted to relocate its headquarters to Lisbon Airport. In the following year, TAP received the first of an initial batch of four Boeing 747-200s. In 1974, it became the first European airline to perform complete overhauls of the Pratt & Whitney JT9D turbofan engine, which powered early versions of the Boeing 747 amongst other aircraft. By the end of the decade, the airline operated a fleet of 32 modern airliners that served in excess of 40 destinations on four continents.

In 1974, TAP introduced a new computerised system handling reservations, load control, and check-in, known as Tapmatic. By the end of 1974, TAP had carried more than 1.5 million passengers, flown 68,210 hours over a network of almost 103,000 kilometres and had a staff of over 9,000.

=== Nationalisation ===
Following the 25 April 1974 revolution, Portugal was caught up in the wave of nationalisations during the following year and TAP was no exception, thus becoming a state-owned corporation during 1975.

Following the independence of both Angola and Mozambique, the importance of the African market decreased tremendously; due to decreasing passenger demand, two of the 747s were sold on during 1976. During 1979, the airline launched a modernisation programme; amongst other brand changes, its name changed to TAP Air Portugal, which was deemed to be easier for international customers to recognise.

=== Fleet modernisation and expansion ===
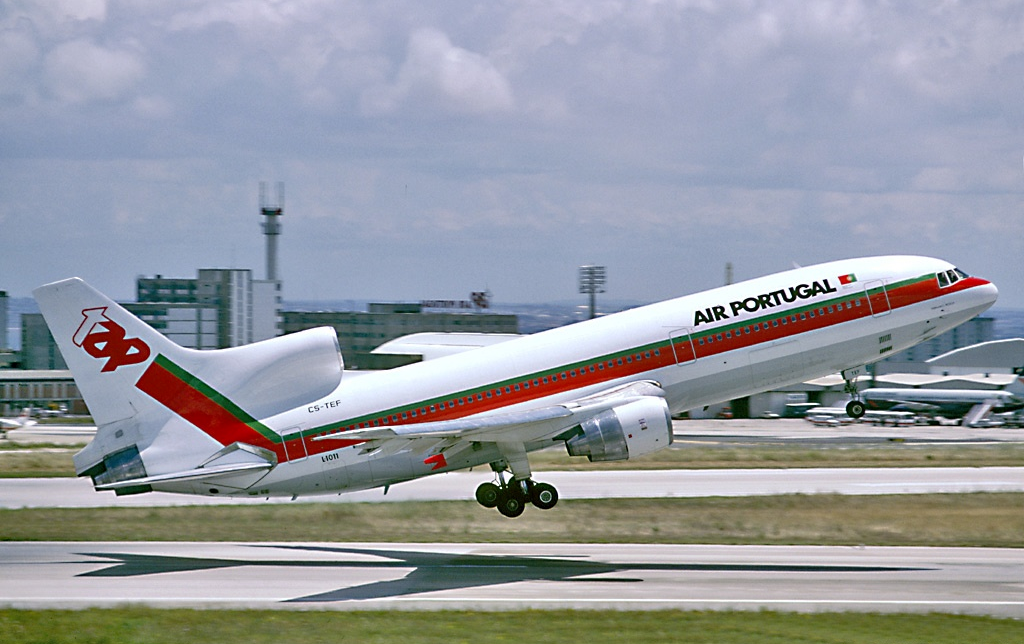
A TAP Air Portugal L-1011-500 at Lisbon Portela Airport in 1988

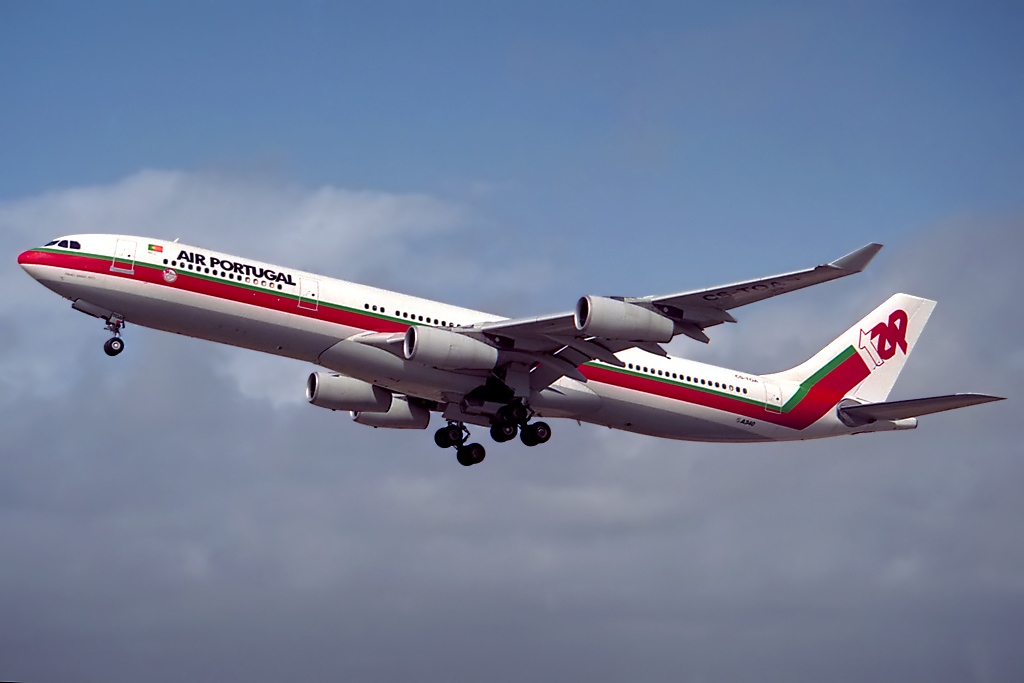
A TAP Air Portugal A340-300 in first livery in 1995

In 1980, TAP launched a new service between Lisbon and Barcelona; operations were also expanded between Milan and Rome. During the following year, Teresa Carvalho became the airline's first female pilot; that same year, its first in-flight magazine, Atlantis, was launched. During 1985, the airline reportedly carried two million passengers within a single year for the first time; a museum dedicated to the airline was also opened on 14 March 1985 to mark the company's fortieth anniversary.

During the 1980s, the fleet of Boeing 707s and 747s was replaced with Lockheed L-1011 TriStars and Airbus A310s on long-haul routes. During 1983, TAP started operating its first Boeing 737-200s on short-haul routes. In 1988, it launched a new fare-calculation and ticketing system. That same year, it also became the first airline to harness land-to-air datalinks via a satellite connection.

During 1985, TAP established its charter subsidiary Air Atlantis, providing leisure flights to most European cities, which operated Boeing 707, Boeing 727 and Boeing 737 jetliners.

During 1991, the airline reportedly carried three million passengers that year for the first time. In 1993, TAP began flying to Tel Aviv. In 1994, TAP signed for a code sharing arrangement with Delta Air Lines for North Atlantic service; this agreement came to an end during 2005. 1996 saw the introduction of service to Boston via Terceira Island, the inauguration of service to Macau and the launch of TAP's website. In 1997, service began to Punta Cana and Bangkok; however, flights to Bangkok and Macau were discontinued during the following year.

By the late 1990s, TAP had expanded its fleet by selling its older Boeing 727s and Boeing 737s and replacing them with Airbus A319, A320 and A321 aircraft. Its TriStars were sold to Air Luxor and were replaced with Airbus A340s beginning in 1995. These changes led to TAP becoming an Airbus-only operator, which it claimed to have also made its fleet more economical and versatile. Furthermore, the airline had initiated a program of continuous cabin modernisation and renewal with the aim of implementing ever greater levels of service. In 1999, TAP introduced its first Blue Flights, upon which smoking was banned.

In 1997, a strategic alliance was formed between TAP and Swissair. Within the scope of this agreement, a team of professional managers arrived at TAP, led by the Brazilian Fernando Pinto. Part of the agreement would lead to Swissair buying a 34% stake of TAP. Also, TAP became a member of Qualiflyer, the frequent-flyer program led by the Swiss flag carrier. Due to financial difficulties, the Swiss company ended up not buying the agreed shares of TAP Air Portugal, unilaterally revoking the partnership agreement which led to unexpected costs for the Portuguese airline in 2000. This revocation culminated in legal action being taken by TAP against Swissair.

=== Start of the 21st century ===
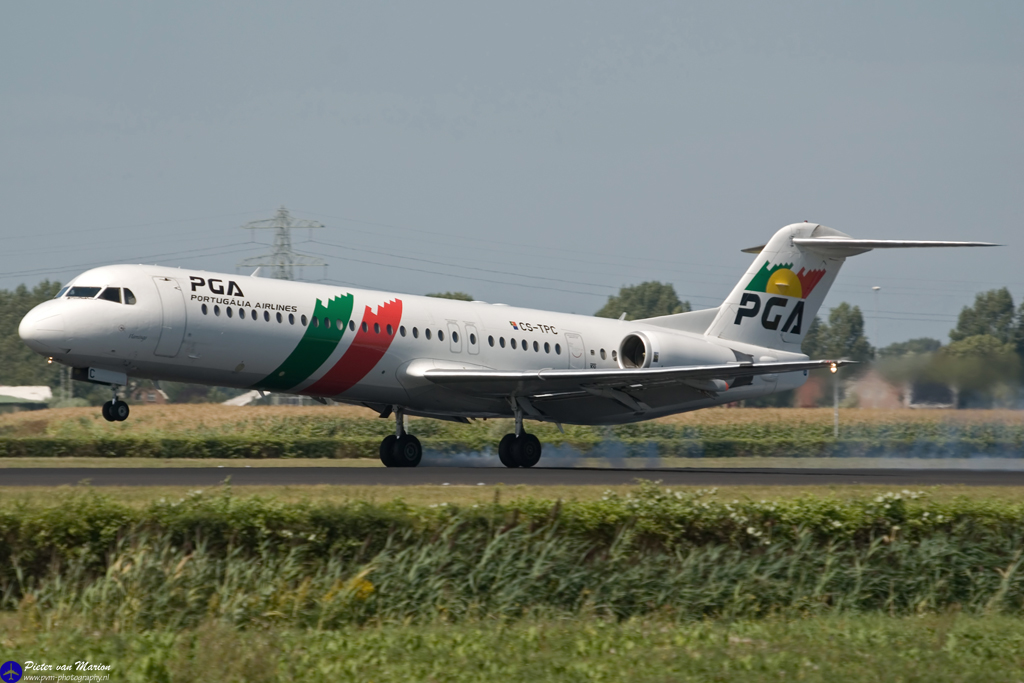
Former Fokker 100 of TAP Air Portugal subsidiary Portugália Airlines

In February 2005, TAP Air Portugal was re-branded TAP Portugal. On 14 March 2005, TAP became a member of the multinational Star Alliance, the same day the company celebrated its 60th anniversary. TAP also ended code-sharing with Delta Air Lines and began a new agreement with United, as part of its Star Alliance membership. Under this agreement, United's code (UA) is placed on TAP Air Portugal's transatlantic flights and some African flights, and TAP Air Portugal's code (TP) is placed on United flights.

In 2006, TAP Air Portugal signed a deal with Espírito Santo International to buy 99.81% of Portugália, a Portuguese regional airline. It also started a code-sharing with US Airways on all routes between Portugal and the United States with connecting services out of Newark and Philadelphia.

In 2007, NATO named TAP Air Portugal the Best Engine/Aircraft Source of Repair for NATO's AWACS Maintenance Program. TAP Air Portugal has complete maintenance and overhaul bases in Portugal (Lisbon) and Brazil (Rio de Janeiro and Porto Alegre) and has specialised line maintenance stations in three continents: 4 in Portugal, 8 in Brazil, and 1 in Angola. It started scheduled flights to Moscow, Warsaw and Helsinki, in June 2009.

After deciding to outsource its Passenger Service System in 2008, TAP migrated its reservation and inventory systems to the Altéa system managed by Amadeus. Before the migration, TAP had been using a system derived from Delta Air Lines called Tapmatic, in use since 1972.

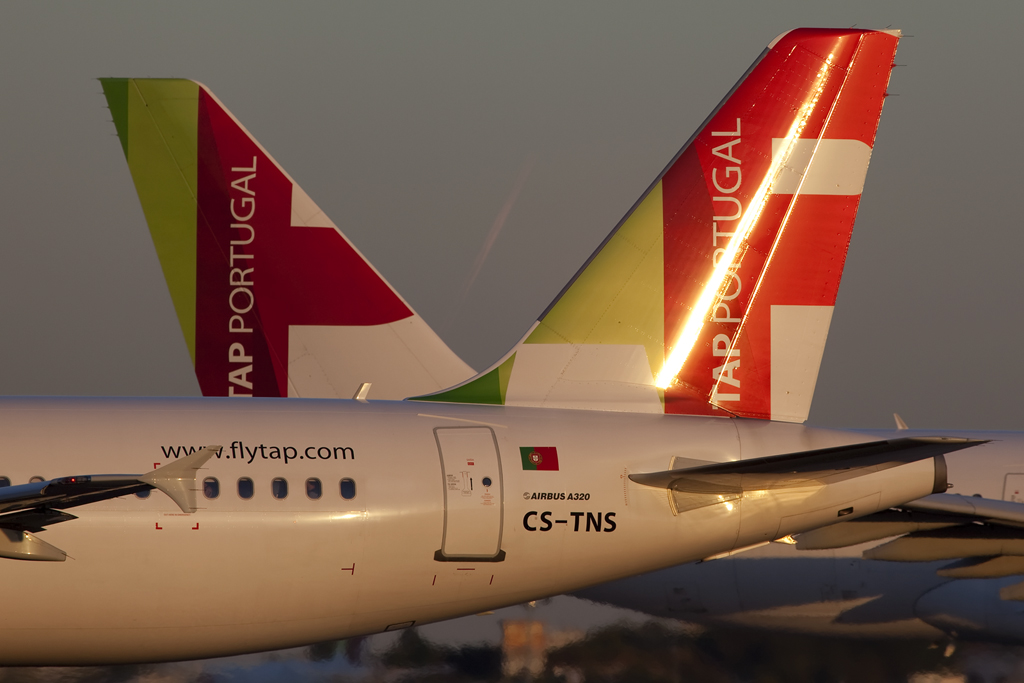
TAP Air Portugal tail fins

In 2010, TAP introduced two new routes to Africa: Marrakesh and Algiers, the latter was discontinued in 2017. The launch of these new routes highlighted the airline's growth strategy for Africa, an important segment in the network where the airline has continually expanded since 2001, going from 236,000 to 541,000 passengers, an increase of more than 129%. In 2011, new long range routes to both Miami and Porto Alegre were introduced.

=== Reprivatisation ===
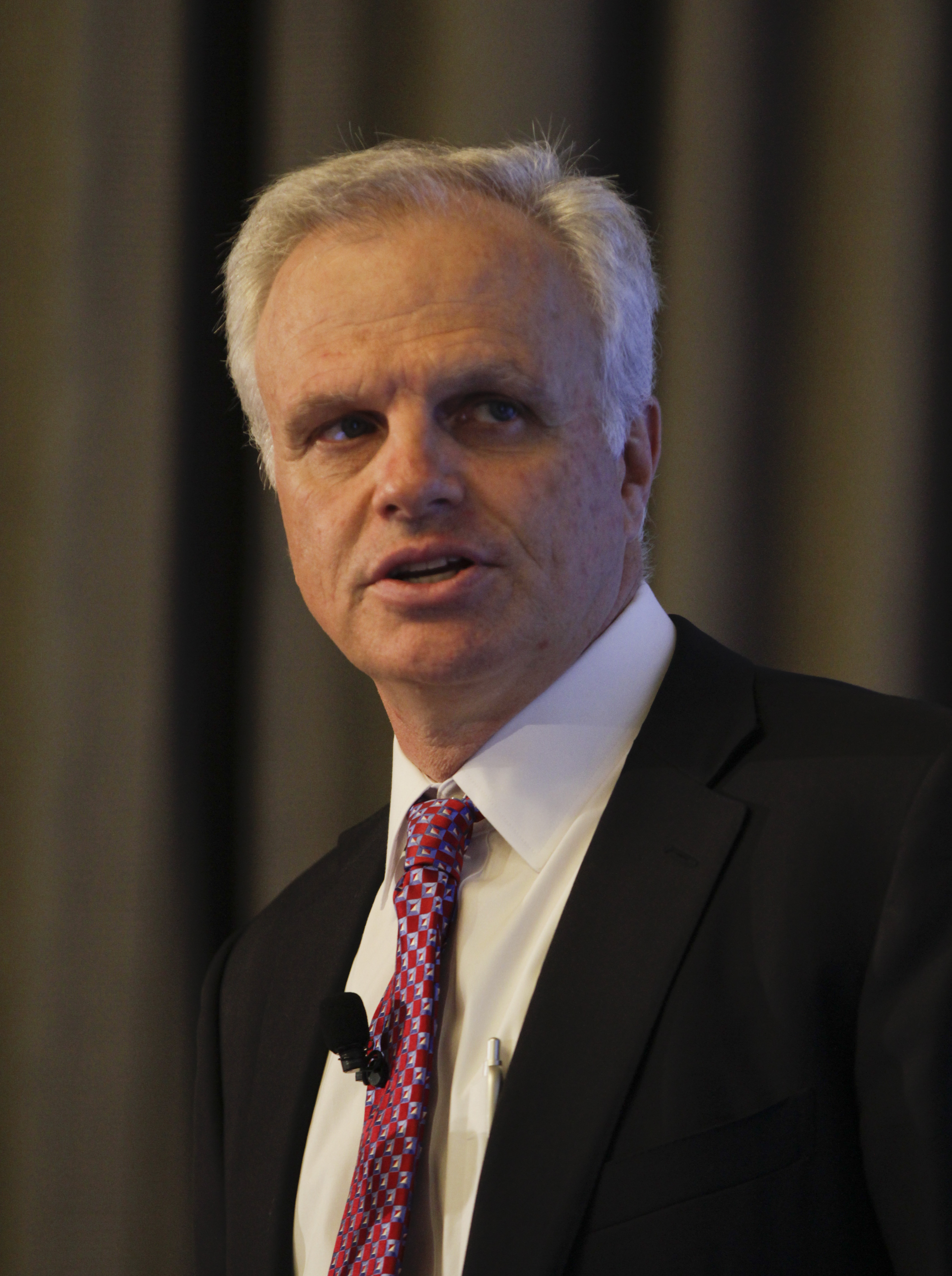
David Neeleman, co-owner of TAP between privatisation in 2015 and renationalisation in 2020, also the founder of jetBlue, WestJet and Azul

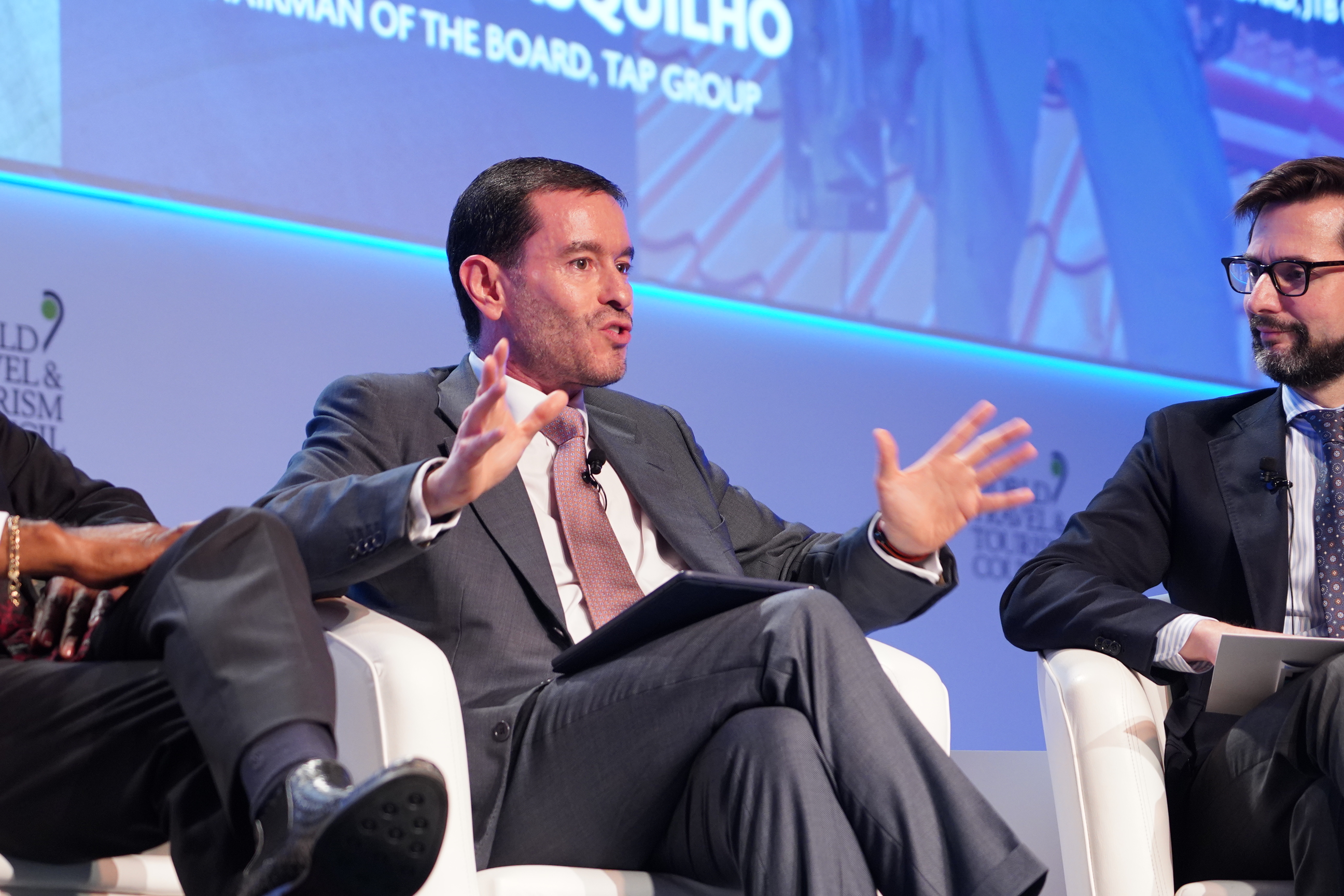
Miguel Antunes Frasquilho, Chairman of TAP since 2017 until March 2023

In order to obtain its three-year national bailout, Portugal was forced to sell its interests in several companies, including the state-run airline. Several international operators were drawn by the airline's strategic position, but on 18 October 2012, the Portuguese government announced a sole potential bidder for the privatised national carrier: South American consortium Synergy Aerospace, owner of Colombian airline Avianca. Portuguese financial daily Dinheiro Vivo indicated that the government would suspend privatisation negotiations if German Efromovich's Synergy Aerospace bid was not approved.

On 21 March 2014, the airline announced it would purchase two ATR 42-600s for subsidiary Portugália, replacing the smaller Beechcraft 1900D previously operated by PGA Express.

The Portuguese government planned to sell its controlling stake in the flag carrier to one or more large investors in a relaunch of the privatisation in 2014. It intended to sell a 66% stake in the airline, with 5% of that set aside for its 7,500 staff. Among known bidders were South American businessman German Efromovich, whose 2012 bid for TAP failed to meet the initial conditions; a consortium formed by American businessman Frank Lorenzo and Portuguese entrepreneur Miguel Pais do Amaral; the American Brazilian businessman David Neeleman, founder of JetBlue in the United States and Azul in Brazil; and finally Globalia, the parent company of Air Europa.

In May 2015, a pilot strike lasting over a week led to the cancellation of around 3,000 TAP Air Portugal flights.

In June 2015, the Portuguese government decided to sell the TAP Air Portugal Group, owner of TAP Air Portugal, to the Atlantic Gateway consortium formed by partners David Neeleman and Humberto Pedrosa, who took control of 61% of the capital of the flag carrier. On the memorandum signed by the new owner, TAP Air Portugal had to keep Portugal as the airline's main hub for a minimum of 30 years. The consortium that secured the company's privatisation in June 2015 promised to buy 53 new Airbus aircraft for the airline; new orders included 14 wide-body A330s and 39 narrow-body A320-family aircraft.

=== Renationalisation ===
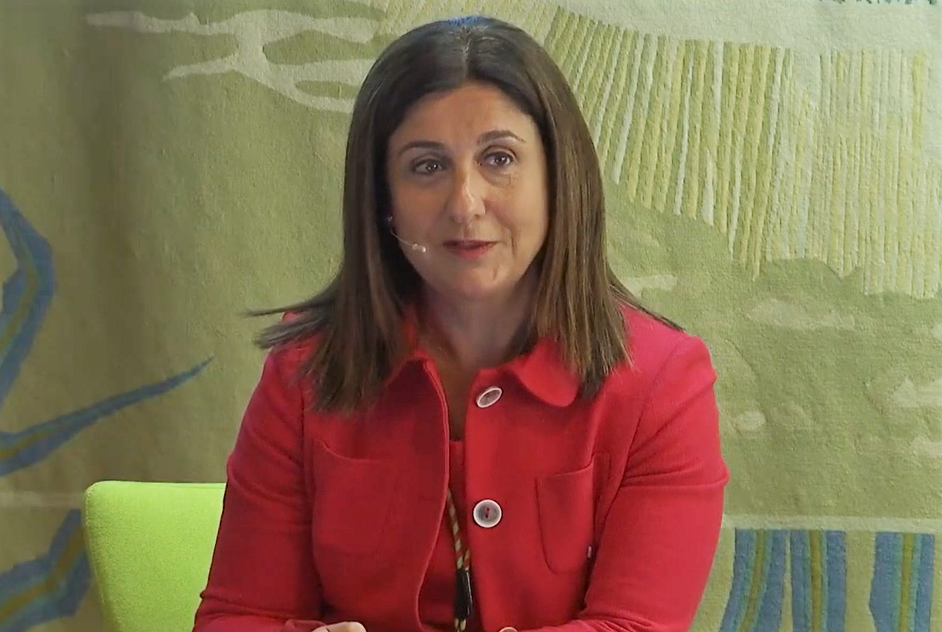
Christine Ourmières-Widener, TAP's CEO from June 2021 to March 2023

In October 2015, a new left-wing government sought to return majority control of the airline to the state through renationalisation, and in February 2016 signed a deal with the private consortium stating that the company was 50% owned by the Portuguese state, 45% by the Atlantic Gateway Consortium and 5% of available shares to TAP collaborators and employees.

On 14 January 2016, TAP Air Portugal announced that subsidiary Portugália Airlines would be rebranded TAP Express by 27 March 2016, as part of further restructuring measures within the group. That same day, it announced that the entire Portugália fleet would be replaced with new aircraft by July 2016, receiving a livery similar to TAP Air Portugal's. A downsizing of the carrier network also took place that month, with TAP announcing the end of long-haul flights to Panama City, Manaus and Bogotá as well as European connections to Hanover and Zagreb.

TAP Air Portugal planned to promote Portugal as a tourism destination in the United States, and Lisbon as a gateway into Europe for North American travellers, and in February 2016 announced the return of New York's John F. Kennedy International and Boston's Logan International as daily non-stop destinations from Lisbon. The Boston service started on 11 June and the new JFK daily flights on 1 July, both operated with new Airbus A330-200s received in June of the same year from Azul Brazilian Airlines. These two new routes reinforced the airline's presence in the American market, along with service to Miami from Lisbon and Newark from Lisbon and Porto. Taken together, the amount of TAP Air Portugal flights to the US grew to 30 per week.

TAP expanded its network in 2017, adding 10 routes, some of which were previously operated by the airline: Abidjan, Ivory Coast; Alicante and Las Palmas, Spain; Bucharest, Romania; Budapest, Hungary; Cologne and Stuttgart, Germany; Fez, Morocco; Lomé, Togo; London City Airport, United Kingdom and Toronto, Canada.

In March 2017, Miguel Antunes Frasquilho, president and CEO of AICEP Portugal Global, was selected to be TAP Air Portugal's new chairman of the board.

On 14 September 2017, TAP Portugal was renamed TAP Air Portugal, going back to the name used between 1979 and 2005.

In 2020, amidst the COVID-19 pandemic, the European Commission approved the Portuguese government's plan to bail out the flag carrier, paving the way for the first tranche of €1.2 billion ($1.36 billion) government loan to help it through the crisis and a restructuring plan including employee downsizing and sale of aircraft.

On 14 November 2022, the announced historic enforcement actions against six airlines, including TAP, $126.5 million in required refunds paid and a $1.1 million penalty, 'for extreme delays in providing refunds.' The Department expects to issue additional orders assessing civil penalties for consumer protection violations this calendar year.

=== Reprivatisation ===
The Portuguese governing majority in Parliament has since announced, in September 2022, it wants to reprivatise the company once again and is awaiting the right market moment to proceed with the plan. According to it, the Portuguese government wants to conclude the sale within the first semester of 2023. The immediate previous renationalisation which currently remains was a prominent political promise from the first mandate of the current executive, within the argument that TAP was a strategic company for the country's economy and as such must be public. The renationalisation received strong criticism from the Portuguese Court of Audits which affirmed it would not be efficient and would burden taxpayers in various millions of euros. The injection of Portuguese taxpayer's money was €338 million directly and €615 million indirectly on debts' guarantees for the company.

In October 2022 the Portuguese Court of Audits again highly criticised the taxpayers' injection of money into TAP stating in its Assessment on the General State Account for 2021 that it should have been accounted as an effective expense and not as a financial asset: 'the classification of financial assets, with no expression in actual expenditure but with a significant impact on debt, which essentially seek to pursue social and public policy objectives and are not intended to produce a financial return'. Thus considering it an unprofitable public investment, with sovereign debt risk association for the State and consequently menacing taxpayers' legitimate interests.

Former Portuguese Infrastructure Minister Pedro Nuno Santos resigned on 29 December 2022 after a backlash over news of a half million euros severance payment to former TAP executive Alexandra Reis, then Treasury Secretary of State, who resigned a day before from government. On 6 March 2023, the Portuguese government fired the airline's Chief Executive Officer (CEO) and Chairman after a damaging report from the Portuguese General Inspectorate of Finances.

On 28 February 2025, during French President Emmanuel Macron's visit to Portugal, Air France-KLM announced that it would bid for a 49% stake in TAP, with Lufthansa and IAG are also bidding. Lufthansa confirmed its participation on 20 November. Only Air France-KLM and Lufthansa submitted bids with IAG withdrawing from the process. Both bidders are proposing to acquire a 44.9% stake with a further 5% to be owned by employees.

On 14 October 2026, the Government of Portugal accepted Lufthansa's bid. Lufthansa will purchased a 44.9% stake with the government holding 50.1% and employees the remaining 5%.

== Corporate affairs and identity ==
=== Business trends ===
The key trends for TAP Air Portugal incl. TAP Express are (as of the financial year ending 31 December 2023):

	Revenue (€m)	Net profit (€m)	Number of employees	Number of passengers (m)	Passenger load factor (%)	Number of destinations	Operating fleet	Notes/ references
2015	2,598	−152	11,023	11.3	80.3	84	61	
2016	2,338	−23	11,019	11.6	79.8	75	63	
2017	2,978	23	10,881	14.2	82.9	85	88	
2018	3,177	−58	8,145	15.7	81.0	91	96	
2019	3,299	−96	9,006	17.0	80.1	95	105	
2020	1,060	−1,230	8,106	4.6	64.6	88	96	
2021	1,389	−1,599	6,626	5.8	63.0	88	94	
2022	3,485	65	6,988	13.7	80.0	90	93	
2023	4,214	177	7,558	15.9	80.8	88	98	
2024	4,242	53.7	7,900	16.1	82.3	86	99	

=== Headquarters ===
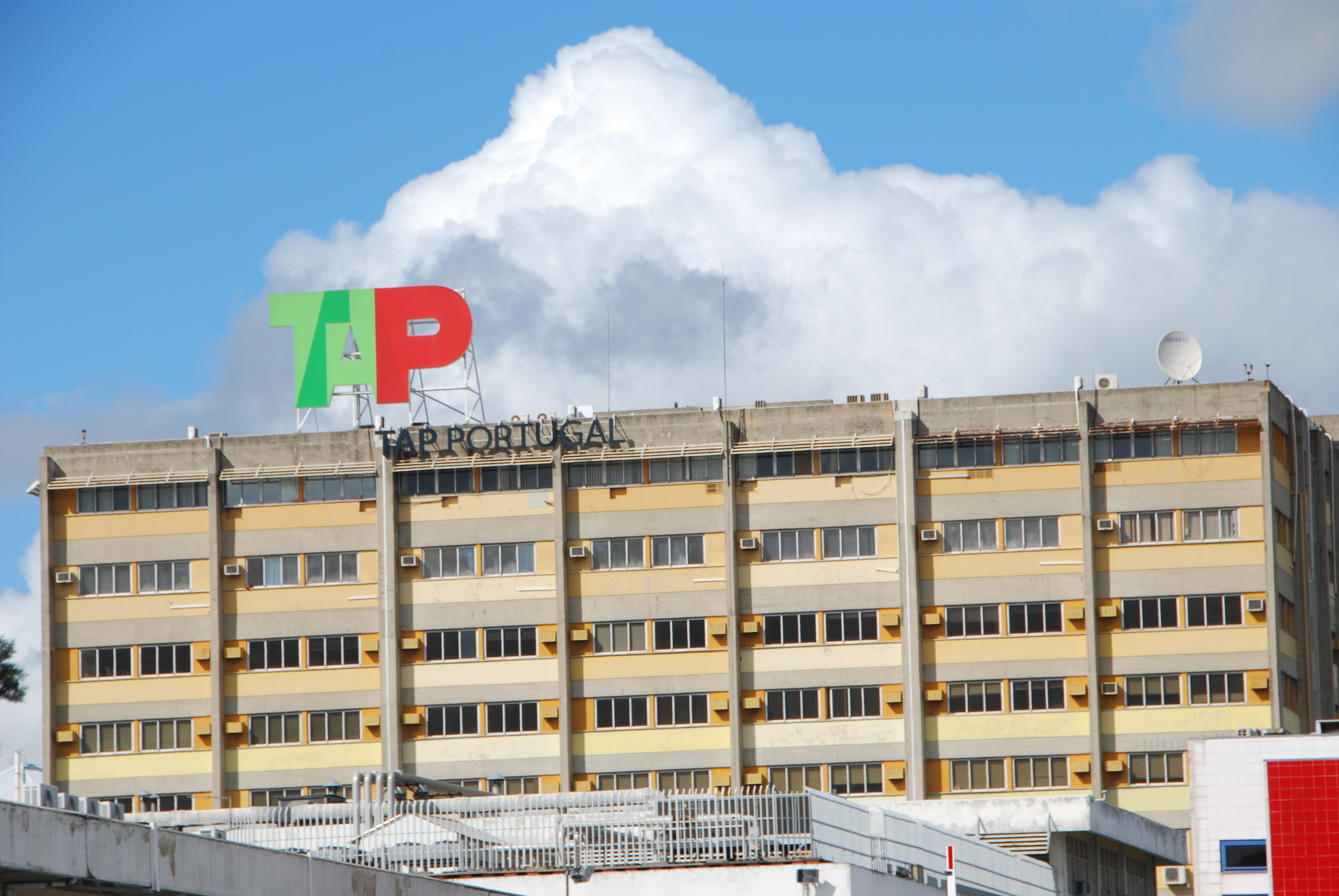
TAP head office in Lisbon

TAP has its head office in Building 25 on the grounds of Humberto Delgado Airport in Santa Maria dos Olivais, Lisbon.

=== Subsidiaries ===
TAP Air Portugal's subsidiaries are:

- (Portugal) TAP Express (100%)
- Groundforce Portugal (49.9%)
- (Portugal) TAP Maintenance and Engineering (100%)
- (Brazil) TAP Maintenance and Engineering Brasil (90%)
- (Portugal) TAP Tours (100%)
- (Portugal) TAP Serviços (100%)
- (Portugal) CateringPOR (51%)
- (Portugal) Megasis (100%)
- (Portugal) UCS (100%)

Until the end of 2016, TAP Air Portugal had a 51% stake in Lojas Francas de Portugal (LFP), a retail joint-venture created in 1995 between the flag carrier and Dufry. LFP is present in Lisbon, Porto, Faro, Madeira and Azores, with over 30 stores, and is also present on board of TAP Air Portugal with its "On Air" shopping magazine. Its stake in the company was sold to Vinci, the owner of ANA Aeroportos de Portugal.

=== TAP Cargo ===
TAP Cargo is the freight branch of TAP Air Portugal. It does not operate its own cargo aircraft, but sells freight capacity aboard TAP's passenger flights and also maintains five scheduled all-cargo routes utilising other airlines:

- London Heathrow Airport operated by European Air Transport with a Boeing 757
- Frankfurt Airport operated by MNG Airlines with an Airbus A300
- Cologne Bonn Airport operated by MNG Airlines with an Airbus A300
- Brussels Airport operated by Royal Jordanian with an Airbus A310
- Dakar Airport

TAP Cargo also operates Lisbon-Luanda all-cargo non-regular flights, in an Avient Aviation DC-10F, a Girjet 747-200F, and other leased aircraft.

=== Branding and identity ===
Beginning on 28 February 2011 TAP began airing its "TAP With Arms Wide Open" (TAP de Braços Abertos) campaign, featuring its new slogan. Three singers, the Brazilian singer Roberta de Sá, the Portuguese singer Mariza, and the Angolan singer Paulo Flores starred in a music video with the song "Arms Wide Open". The music video featured TAP employees. The inclusion of the three singers was intended to highlight the proximity between peoples in the Lusophone countries.

In 2005, TAP unveiled its current logo and livery, to coincide with its Star Alliance membership, during the airline's 60th anniversary. It also saw the name change from TAP Air Portugal, introduced in the 1970s, to TAP Portugal. On 14 September 2017, TAP returned to its previous name. The first logo dates back to 1945 when the airline was founded. It consisted of a blue wing with the acronym TAP written to its left.

=== Museum ===
The TAP museum unit was created in 1978, but it only opened officially on 14 March 1985 as part of the company's 40th-anniversary celebrations. Its venue was at the company's head office on the grounds of Lisbon airport. Due to space limitations, on 29 January 2010, the new premises of the Museu do Ar (Air Museum), in the municipality of Sintra, opened to the public. This extensive museum is the result of a three-way partnership between airport operator Ana-Aeroportos, the Portuguese Air Force and TAP. The collection on display recounts the history of military and civil aviation in Portugal. Visitors can see 40 aircraft, including a TAP Douglas DC-3, simulators, engines, and other exhibits. A panel of photographs in the main hangar tells the story of 100 years of aviation in Portugal.

== Awards ==
In 2007, TAP Air Portugal was awarded by NATO as the Best Engine/Aircraft Source of Repair for the NATO AWACS Maintenance Program and has been distinguished with the highest maintenance and overhaul practice awards from Airbus Industries in 1996, 2000, 2003, and 2005, being certified for full aircraft, engine and component maintenance and overhaul by the FAA, EASA, and several other important certification entities and aircraft manufacturers (Airbus, Boeing, and Embraer).

In 2010, TAP Air Portugal was awarded the "World's Best Airline Award" by British Condé Nast Traveler magazine, after being rated for its excellence in previous years, and was rated as the "Best Airline to South America" by the World Travel Awards in 2009 and 2010, with nominations for "Europe's Leading Airline" and "Europe's Leading Business Class" in 2007, 2009 and 2010. TAP Air Portugal has also consistently achieved high ranks and various awards from specializ]sed air travel publications such as Skytrax and Publituris due to the company's excellence in service and performance. In recent years, TAP Air Portugal has been consecutively elected World's Leading Airline to Africa and South America by the World Travel Awards (WTA), considered the "Oscars" of the world travel industry.

In the December 2017/January 2018 edition of the magazine Monocle's Travel Top 50, an annual list, selected by the magazine's editors, awarded Portugal's TAP airline the accolade of "most handsome crew".

== Destinations ==
As of June 2017, TAP Air Portugal serves 87 destinations in 34 countries across Europe, Africa, North America and South America, with some domestic, European and African destinations being operated by TAP Express.

TAP Air Portugal is the leading European airline flying to Brazil, offering more destinations from its hub in Lisbon than any other European airline. Many Europeans transit through Portugal to fly to Brazil due to a large number of airport slots TAP holds in the South American country.

In March 2016, TAP Air Portugal began an air shuttle service, designated "Ponte Aérea", to connect Lisbon and Porto's airports with flights every hour adding up to 18 round-trip flights. It is operated by White Airways on behalf of the regional brand Portugália. As of 2019, TAP Air Portugal will launch 15 new routes as well as receive 15 new aircraft.

=== Codeshare agreements ===
TAP Air Portugal has codeshare agreements with the following airlines:

- Aegean Airlines
- airBaltic
- Air Canada
- Air China
- Air India
- All Nippon Airways
- Austrian Airlines
- Azores Airlines
- Azul Brazilian Airlines
- Beijing Capital Airlines
- Brussels Airlines
- Croatia Airlines
- Egyptair
- El Al
- Emirates
- Ethiopian Airlines
- Etihad Airways
- Finnair
- Gol Transportes Aéreos
- Icelandair
- ITA Airways
- JetBlue
- LATAM Brasil
- LAM Mozambique Airlines
- LOT Polish Airlines
- Lufthansa
- Luxair
- S7 Airlines
- Singapore Airlines
- South African Airways
- Swiss International Air Lines
- Thai Airways International
- Turkish Airlines
- United Airlines

== Fleet ==
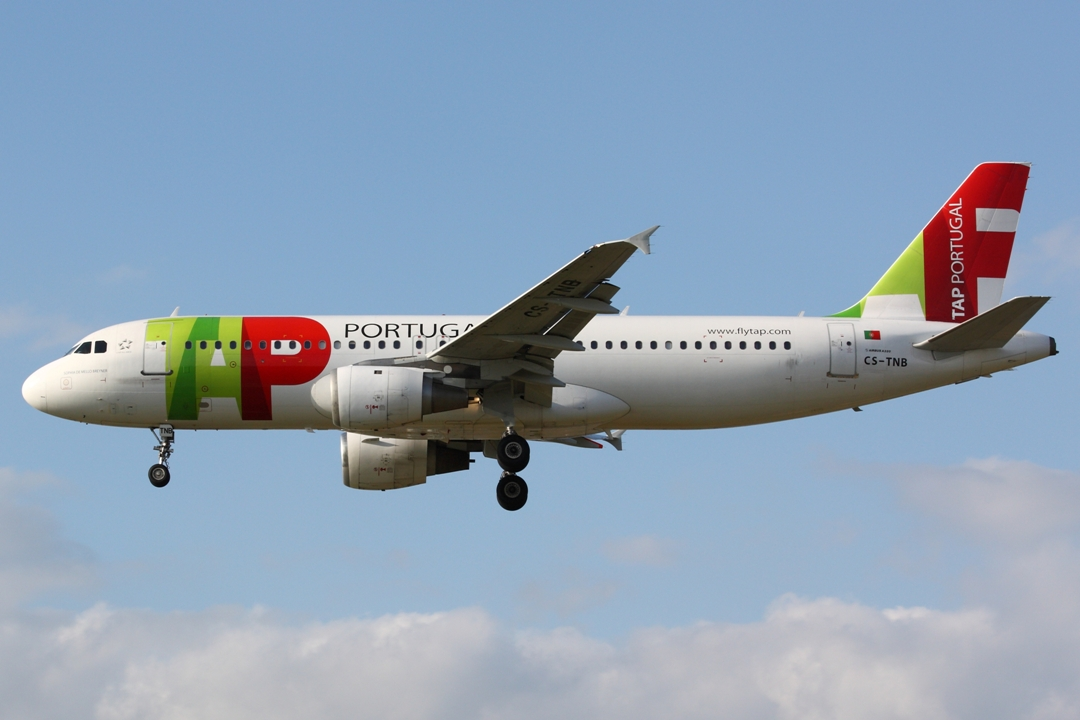
TAP Air Portugal Airbus A320-200

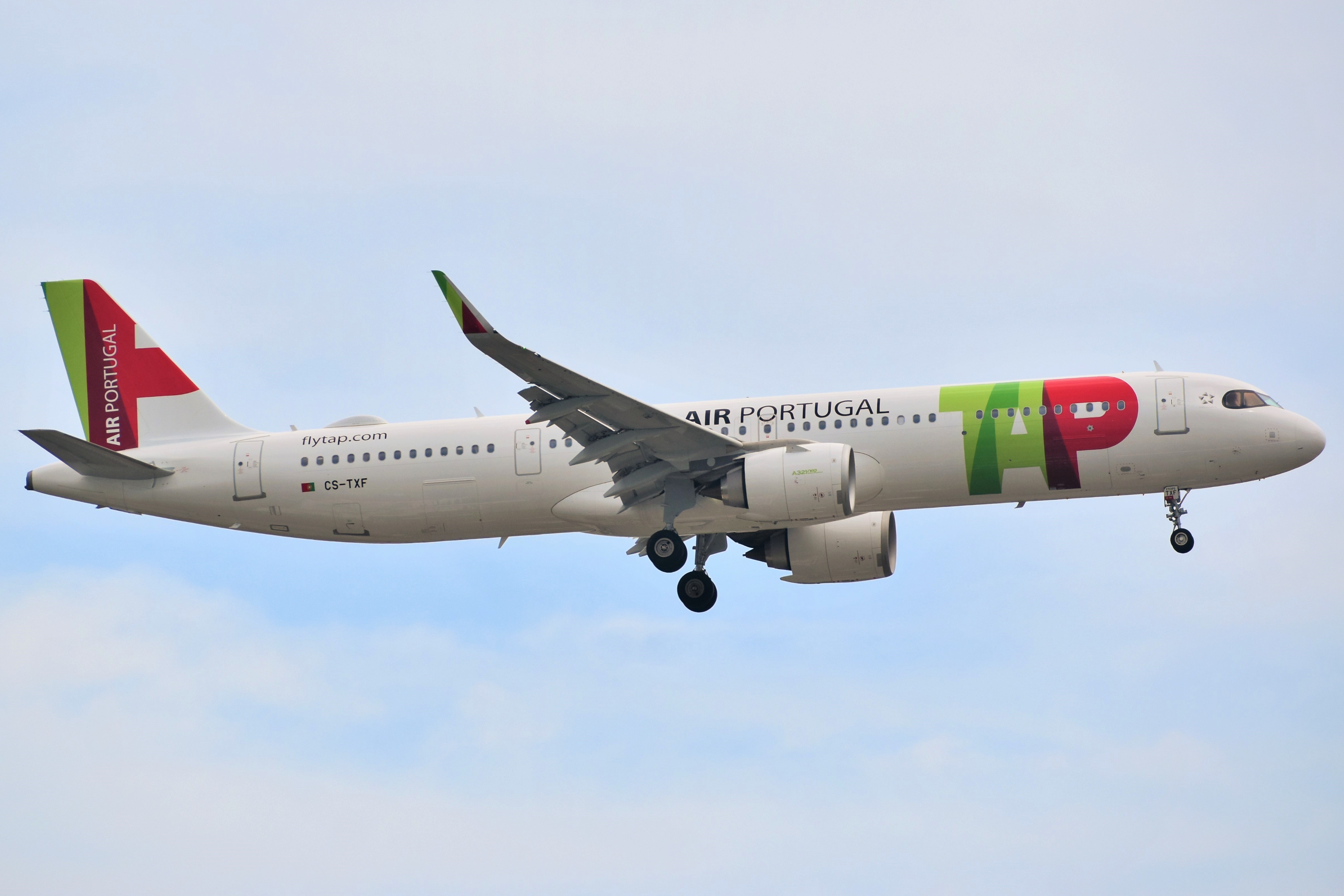
TAP Air Portugal Airbus A321neo

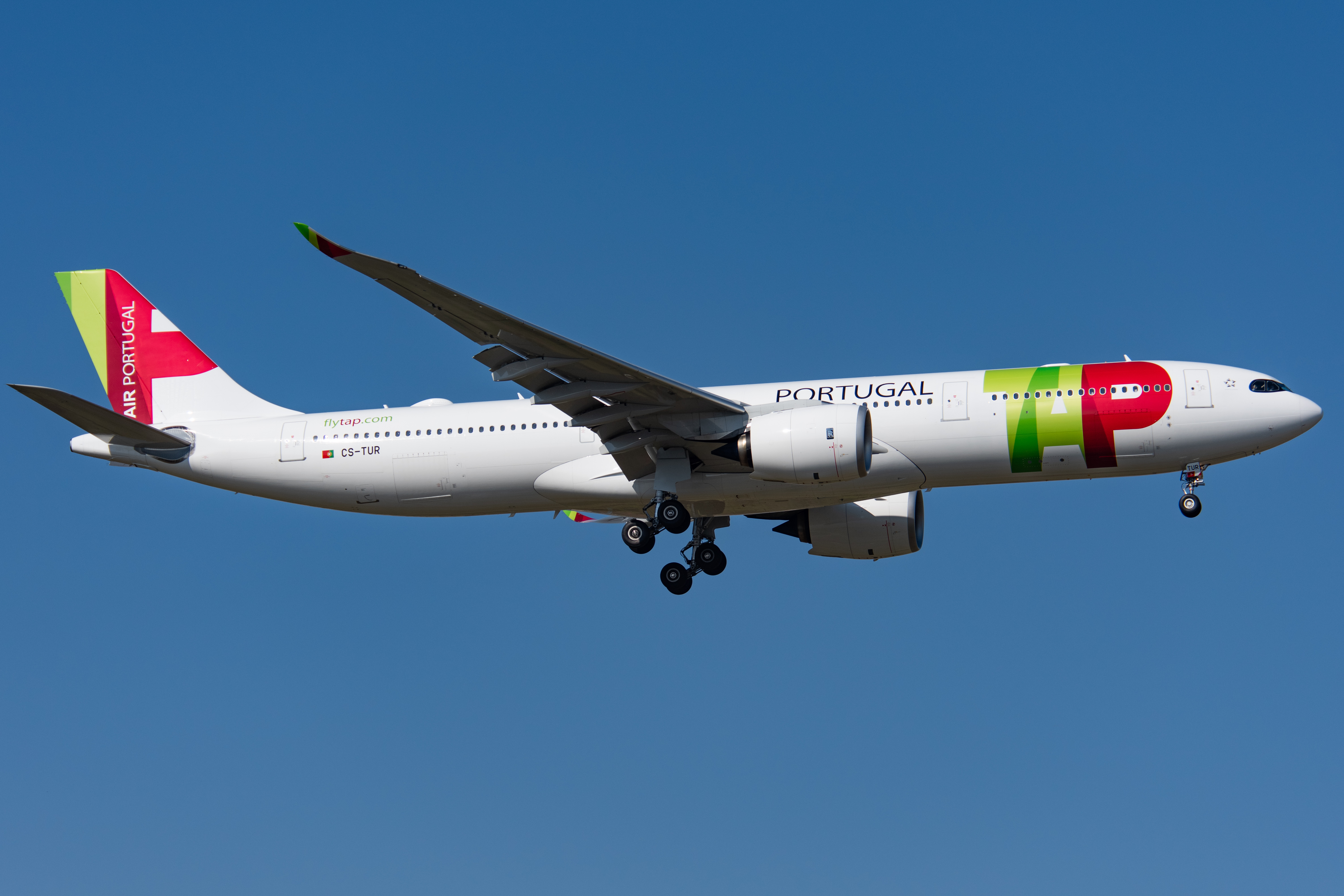
TAP Air Portugal Airbus A330-900

=== Current fleet ===
As of May 2026, TAP Air Portugal operates an all-Airbus fleet composed of the following aircraft:

TAP Air Portugal fleet
Aircraft	In service	Orders	Passengers					Notes
Aircraft	In service	Orders	B	W	Y	Total	Refs	Notes
Airbus A319-100	3	—	—	—	144	144		
Airbus A320-200	14	—	—	—	174	174		
Airbus A320neo	18	7	—	—	174	174		
Airbus A321-200	3	—	—	—	216	216		
Airbus A321LR	13	—	16	42	113	171		
Airbus A321neo	24	9	16	—	182	198		
Airbus A321neo	24	9	—	—	216	216		
Airbus A321neo	24	9	—	—	221	221		
Airbus A330-200	3	—	25	—	244	269		
Airbus A330-900	19	2	34	96	168	298		Launch customer.
Total	97	18						

=== Fleet development ===
TAP Air Portugal became the launch customer of the Airbus A330neo in November 2018 when the airframer delivered to the airline the first aircraft of the type, on lease from Avolon. TAP ordered 21 of these aircraft, of which 10 are directly ordered from Airbus and the rest will be leased. As of September 2018 they estimate to have 133 aircraft in the fleet by 2025 including TAP Express.

=== Historic fleet ===
Before its current fleet, TAP Air Portugal had operated the following aircraft types:

TAP Air Portugal historical fleet
Aircraft	Introduced	Retired	Refs
Airbus A310-300	1988	2008	
Airbus A330-300	2017	2019	
Airbus A340-300	1995	2019	
Beechcraft E90 King Air	1979	1984	
Beechcraft Baron 58	1975	1979	
Boeing 707-382B	1965	1989	
Boeing 727-100	1967	1989	
Boeing 727-200	1975	1991	
Boeing 737-200	1983	1999	
Boeing 737-300	1988	2001	
Boeing 747-282B	1972	1984	
de Havilland Canada DHC-6 Twin Otter	1979	1987	
Douglas DC-3	1945	1959	
Douglas DC-4	1947	1960	
de Havilland Comet	1959	1962	
Lockheed L-1011 TriStar	1983	1997	
Lockheed L-1049 Super Constellation	1953	1967	
Sud Aviation Caravelle	1962	1969	

== Services ==
=== Lounges ===
TAP Air Portugal offers two different lounges at Lisbon Airport, the TAP Premium Lounge, available for Victoria Gold Winners, Star Alliance Gold members and passengers flying on business class on Star Alliance flights, while Victoria Silver Winners only have access to the Blue Lounge, contracted with the handling subsidiary Groundforce.

=== Cabins ===
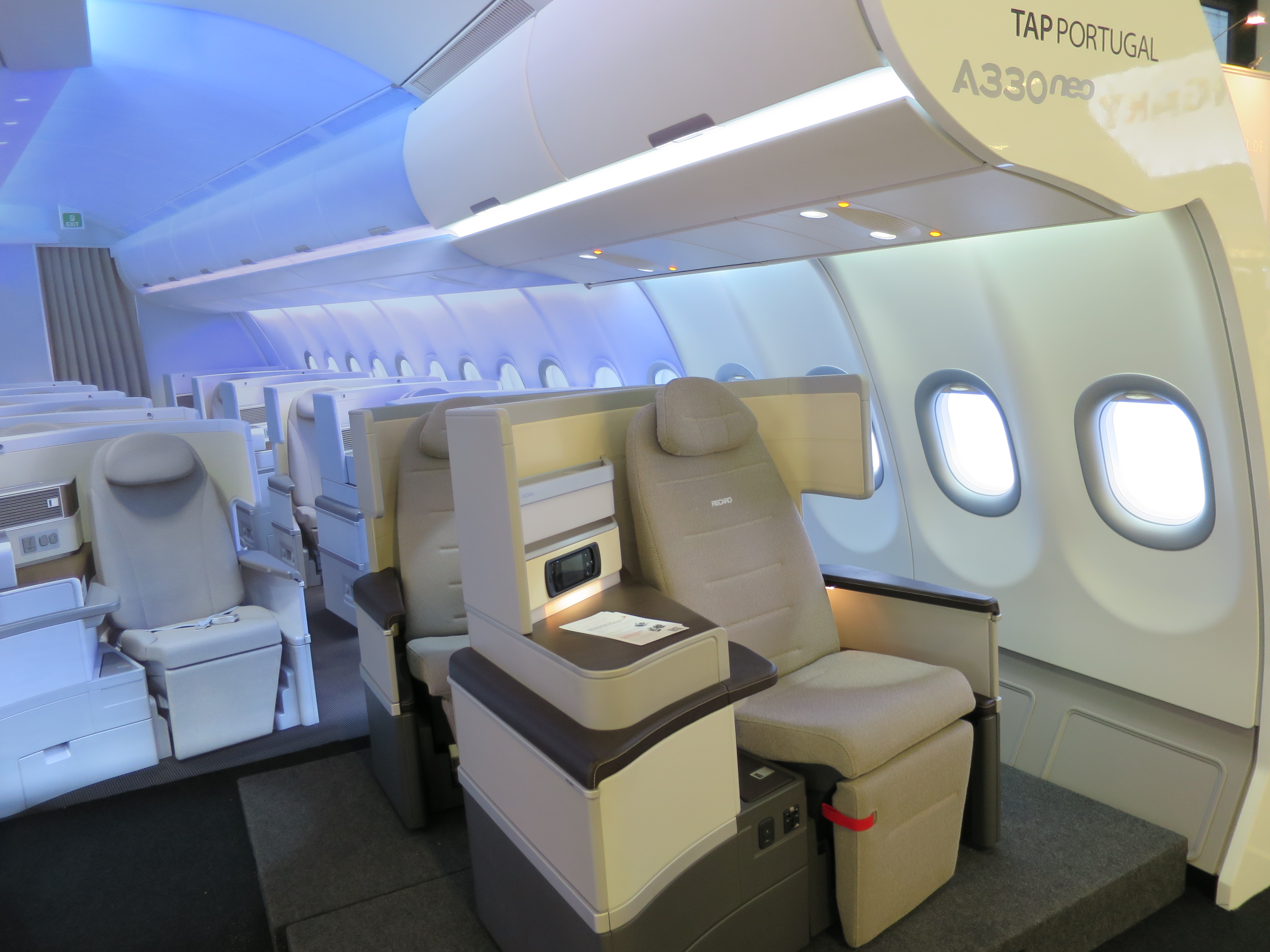
TAP Air Portugal A330neo interior mock-up

The aircraft are divided into a two-class cabin: business class (branded as tap|executive) and economy classes (tap|plus, tap|classic, tap|basic and tap|discount). TAP Air Portugal does not offer first-class services. On the medium-haul fleet of Airbus A319, Airbus A320 and Airbus A321 aircraft, both cabins have been retrofitted with new leather seats. The executive class offers better privacy than economy class, and more meal options. On the long-haul fleet of Airbus A330, A330neo and A321LR aircraft, the cabin is divided into a two-class layout. The economy class of the new Airbus A330s, A330neos and A321LRs are equipped with modern individual LCDs with a touchscreen and a complete IFE. The entire fleet of Airbus A340 economy class was refurbished during 2013, adding a new seat design and a new in-flight entertainment system. In business class, seats are capable of turning into lie-flat beds. New Airbus A330 aircraft are also fitted with extra functions.

TAP's in-flight magazine is named UP and is available on board, as a fully responsive website (compatible with desktops, smart phones and tablets), and as a freely downloadable application for Apple's iPad.

==== Airspace by Airbus ====
The Portuguese airline will also be the first to take a new cabin layout called "Airspace". The design allows airlines to add more seats.

=== Frequent-flyer program ===
TAP Air Portugal current loyalty program is Miles & Go which replaced an earlier program called Victoria. These are programs which awards members miles based on the distance travelled, ticket fare and class of service. As part of Star Alliance, miles can be earned from Star Alliance and other eligible partners. Membership in the frequent-flier programme is free. The Miles&Go Programme is divided into three tiers:

- The basic tier, with no mileage requirements.
- TAP Miles&Go Silver (Star Alliance Silver), with a requirement of 30,000 Status Miles or 25 segments flown within one year.
- TAP Miles&Go Gold (Star Alliance Gold), with a requirement of 70,000 Status Miles or 50 segments flown within one year.

The programme does have a feature whereby some of the miles can be converted from regular award miles.

== Accidents and incidents ==
According to the JACDEC Airliner Safety Report released in January 2021 TAP ranks 22nd on the list of 100 largest airlines measured by their revenue passenger performance in RPK's.

- On 27 January 1948, a Douglas C-47A-50-DL (DC-3) (registered as CS-TDB) was conducting a training flight over Lisbon in adverse weather when the plane lost control and crashed in Monte da Caparica. All 3 people on board were killed.
- TAP Air Portugal Flight 425: the crash of Flight 425 at Madeira Airport on 19 November 1977 remains TAP's deadliest accident. Flight 425 was flying to Madeira Airport from Brussels via Lisbon. The Boeing 727 crashed while landing on runway 24 in heavy rain. Before the crash, the pilot had made two unsuccessful attempts to land and had decided to make one more attempt. The plane touched down too late and overran the runway which was, at the time, only 1,600 metres (5,200 ft) long. The plane crashed onto a beach at the end of the runway, splitting into two pieces and bursting into flames. Of the 164 people aboard, 131 were killed and 33 survived. It is the second-deadliest airplane accident in Portugal (after Independent Air Flight 1851). The crash prompted officials to explore ways of extending the short runway on Madeira. Because of the height of the runway relative to the beach below, an extension was deemed very difficult and too expensive to perform at the time. A 200 m (656 ft) extension was built between 1983 and 1986. In 2000, the runway was extended to a length of 2,781 m (9,124 ft) and made capable of handling wide-body commercial jets, such as the Boeing 747 and Airbus A340.
- TAP Air Portugal Flight 1492: On 2 September 2022, engine 2 of Flight 1492, an Airbus A320-251N, struck a motorcycle that crossed the runway at Ahmed Sékou Touré International Airport in Conakry, Guinea, during the plane's landing roll. Both riders on the motorcycle were killed, however everyone on board the plane was unharmed. Engine 2 of the plane was damaged from the collision.
