= Omni Aviation =

Portuguese airline

OMNI - Aviação e Tecnologia, S.A.
IATA	ICAO	Call sign
OC	OAV	OMNI
- Founded: 1988
- Ceased operations: September 2026
- Fleet size: 5
- Headquarters: Cascais, Portugal
- Website: www.omniaviation.pt

Omni – Aviação e Tecnologia, trading as Omni - Executive Aviation, was an airline company headquartered in Cascais, Lisbon Region, Portugal.

On 17 September 2026, it was reported that the airline entered insolvency, and had its air operator's certificate suspended.

== Overview ==
Omni was incorporated in Portugal in 1988 and has developed from a single-contract, single-client seasonal provider to a group of 11 companies, involving a staff complement of 400 personnel and an annual turnover of 90 million euros.

Business:

- Aircraft Management
- Charter
- Maintenance
- Consulting and sales

In January 2025, Omni Aviação SGPS, the owner of OMNI – Executive Aviation, reached an agreement to sell the business to OPUL Aviation Group, based in London.

== Fleet ==
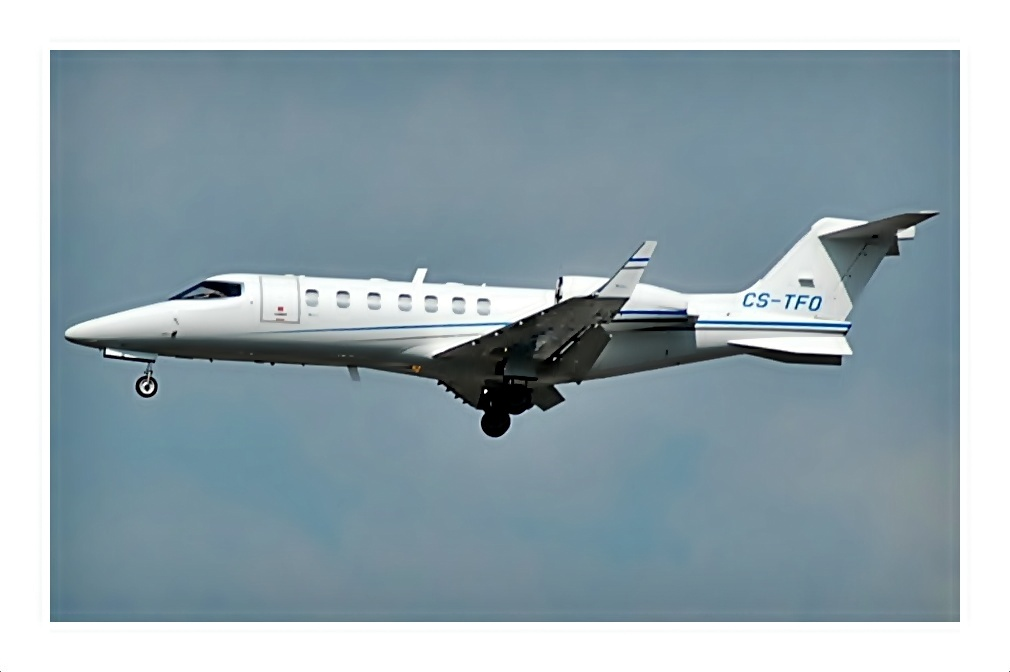
Omni Aviation Learjet 40

The Omni Aviation fleet comprises the following aircraft with fixed wing and rotary wing:

Omni Aviation fleet
Aircraft	In Service
Global Express	3
Challenger 605	1
Learjet 40	2
Learjet 45	1
