= Cape Verde bus crash =

2026 motor vehicle incident in Cape Verde

2026 Cape Verde bus crash

Details
- Date: 5 September 2026
- Location: São Filipe
- Country: Cape Verde
- Incident type: Bus crash
- Cause: Under investigation

Statistics
- Bus: 1
- Passengers: 38
- Deaths: 25 (including the bus driver)
- Injured: 14

On 5 September 2026, a passenger bus carrying students fell into a ravine in the island of Fogo, Cape Verde, killing 25 people and wounding 14 others. The crash was the deadliest transport accident to have occurred on the country's soil, surpassing TACV Flight 5002 in 1999.

== Background ==
The bus was carrying 39 people (including the driver), mostly secondary school students from Curral Grande and Ponta Verde. According to a local authority, the trip was not organized by the schools; such private trips were usually carried out by the driver, at the end or before the start of a school year. Fatal road crashes are relatively uncommon in Cape Verde, where road infrastructure is generally considered to be in good condition.

== Accident ==
The accident happened in the night of 5 September 2026, when the bus fell down a ravine approximately 30 meters deep, on the road between Chã das Caldeiras and Campanas de Cima, in the north of the municipality of São Filipe.

== Victims ==
Of the twenty-five confirmed deaths, twenty died at the scene and five (aged between six and sixteen years old) later in the hospital during the early morning hours, most of whom were children and teenagers. The bus driver is among the fatalities. Among the fourteen injured, some of whom are in serious condition, were those aged between six and eleven years old. There were also catechists and members of Cape Verdean choral groups. Several passengers were thrown from the vehicle. The accident site, being in a ravine with difficult access, hampered rescue efforts for the victims.

== Investigation ==
Witnesses at the scene said that was due to a tire blowout, making the driver lose control of the vehicle, but the causes are yet to be investigated.

According to the newspaper A Nação, at least four possible hypotheses have emerged from the evidence collected at the scene: two of them are related to the road conditions at the crash site. Investigators are considering whether the steep terrain or one of the sharp bends in the road may have contributed to the accident. The section is particularly characterized by steep slopes, tight curves and lack of high-impact safety barriers.

Two other possibilities are also being examined. One is that the bus may have been carrying more passengers or weight than it was designed to handle, potentially placing excessive strain on its braking system during an emergency.

However, the scenario that appears most of the reports gathered so far support, according to the newspaper, is a sudden mechanical failure affecting the bus's brakes, which may have occurred while the vehicle was descending a steep slope, causing it to pick up considerable speed.

== Reactions ==
President José Maria Neves reacted by calling the accident "a great catastrophe" and urging the competent authorities to give "maximum priority to medical, psychological and social assistance to the affected families, underlining the importance of a rigorous and swift investigation into the causes of the accident".

Prime Minister Francisco Carvalho considered the road accident to be a "moment of profound sorrow for the entire country", assuring that the government is already in constant coordination with the Civil Protection services, the Ministry of Health and the municipalities of Fogo Island to ensure a "swift and comprehensive response to this tragedy". Following the crash, the Carvalho's government decreed two days of official mourning.

Prime Minister of Portugal Luís Montenegro said he received "with deep consternation the news of the tragedy that struck Fogo Island". President of the Assembly of the Republic José Pedro Aguiar-Branco lamented the tragedy, underlining in a statement "the brutality and injustice of this tragedy, which cut short so many lives so early", causing "a pain difficult to express in words".

== See also ==
- List of traffic collisions (2000–present)
- Transport in Cape Verde
- Roads in Cape Verde
