= Galinheiro =

- Settlement
- Coordinates: 14.999°N 24.444°W
- Country: Cape Verde
- Island: Fogo
- Municipality: São Filipe
- Civil parish: São Lourenço

Population (2010)
  - Total: 877
- ID: 82105

Galinheiro is a settlement in the northwestern part of the island of Fogo, Cape Verde. In 2010 its population was 877. It is situated 2 km northeast of Ponta Verde, 2.5 km southwest of São Jorge, and 13 km northeast of the island capital São Filipe.

== See also ==
- List of villages and settlements in Cape Verde
