= Santo António (Fogo) =

- Settlement
- Coordinates: 14.944°N 24.480°W
- Country: Cape Verde
- Island: Fogo
- Municipality: São Filipe
- Civil parish: São Lourenço

Population (2010)
  - Total: 530
- ID: 82112

Santo António (Cape Verdean Creole Sanu Antóniu) is a settlement in the western part of the island of Fogo, Cape Verde, 6 km northeast of the island capital of São Filipe.

== See also ==
- List of villages and settlements in Cape Verde
