= Lomba, Cape Verde =

Lomba
- Settlement
- Coordinates: 14.969°N 24.450°W
- Country: Cape Verde
- Island: Fogo
- Municipality: São Filipe
- Civil parish: São Lourenço

Population (2010)
  - Total: 731
- ID: 82107

Lomba is a settlement in the northwestern part of the island of Fogo, Cape Verde. In 2010 its population was 731. It is situated 10 km northeast of the island capital São Filipe.

== See also ==
- List of villages and settlements in Cape Verde
