= São Jorge, Cape Verde =

São Jorge
- Settlement
- Coordinates: 15.013°N 24.430°W
- Country: Cape Verde
- Island: Fogo
- Municipality: São Filipe
- Civil parish: São Lourenço

Population (2010)
  - Total: 635
- ID: 82111

São Jorge is a settlement in the northern part of the island of Fogo, Cape Verde. It is situated near the coast, 2 km west of Campanas Baixo, 2 km northeast of Galinheiro and 15 km northeast of the island capital São Filipe.

== Sights ==
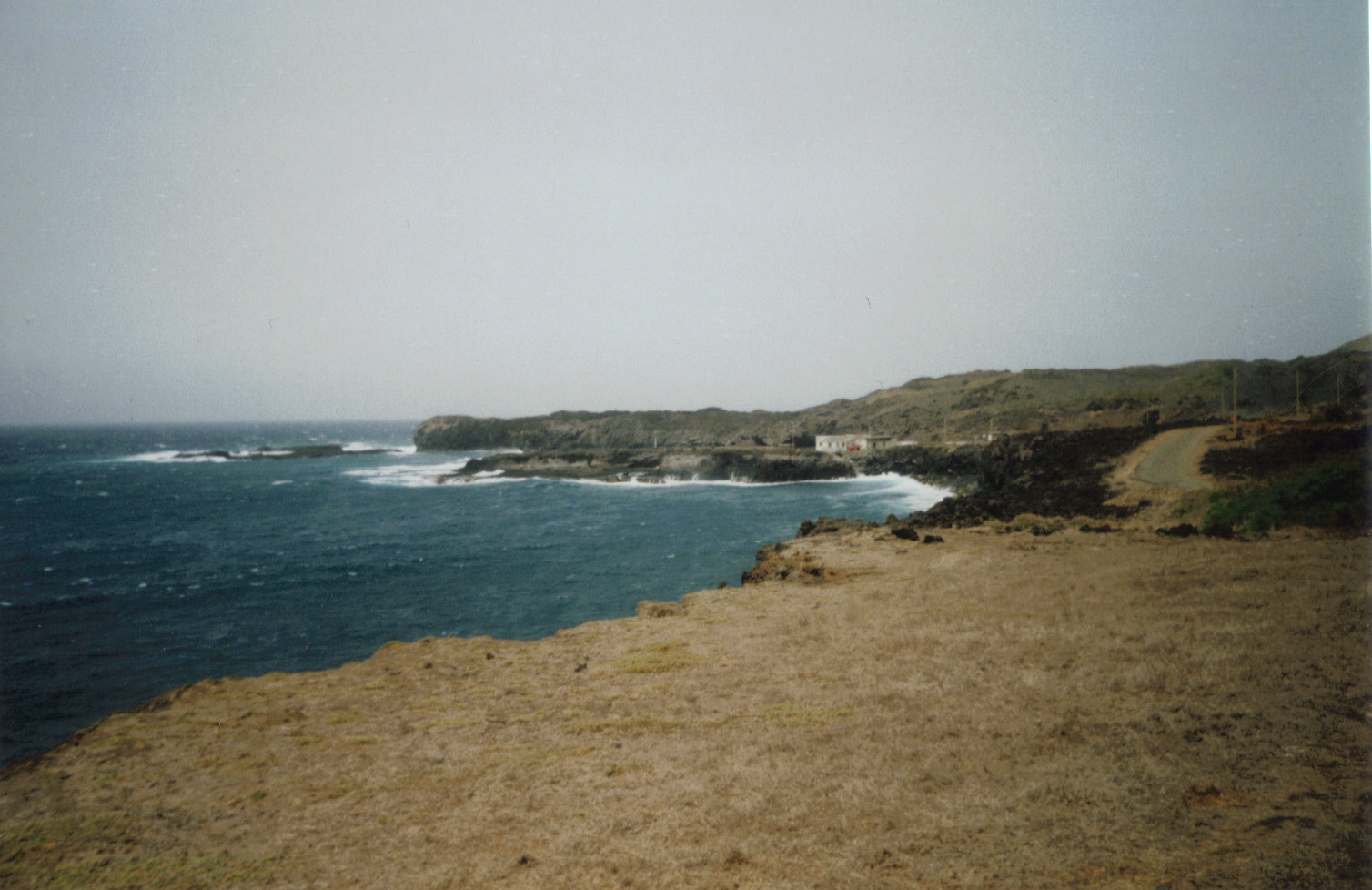
Beach Ponta da Salina.

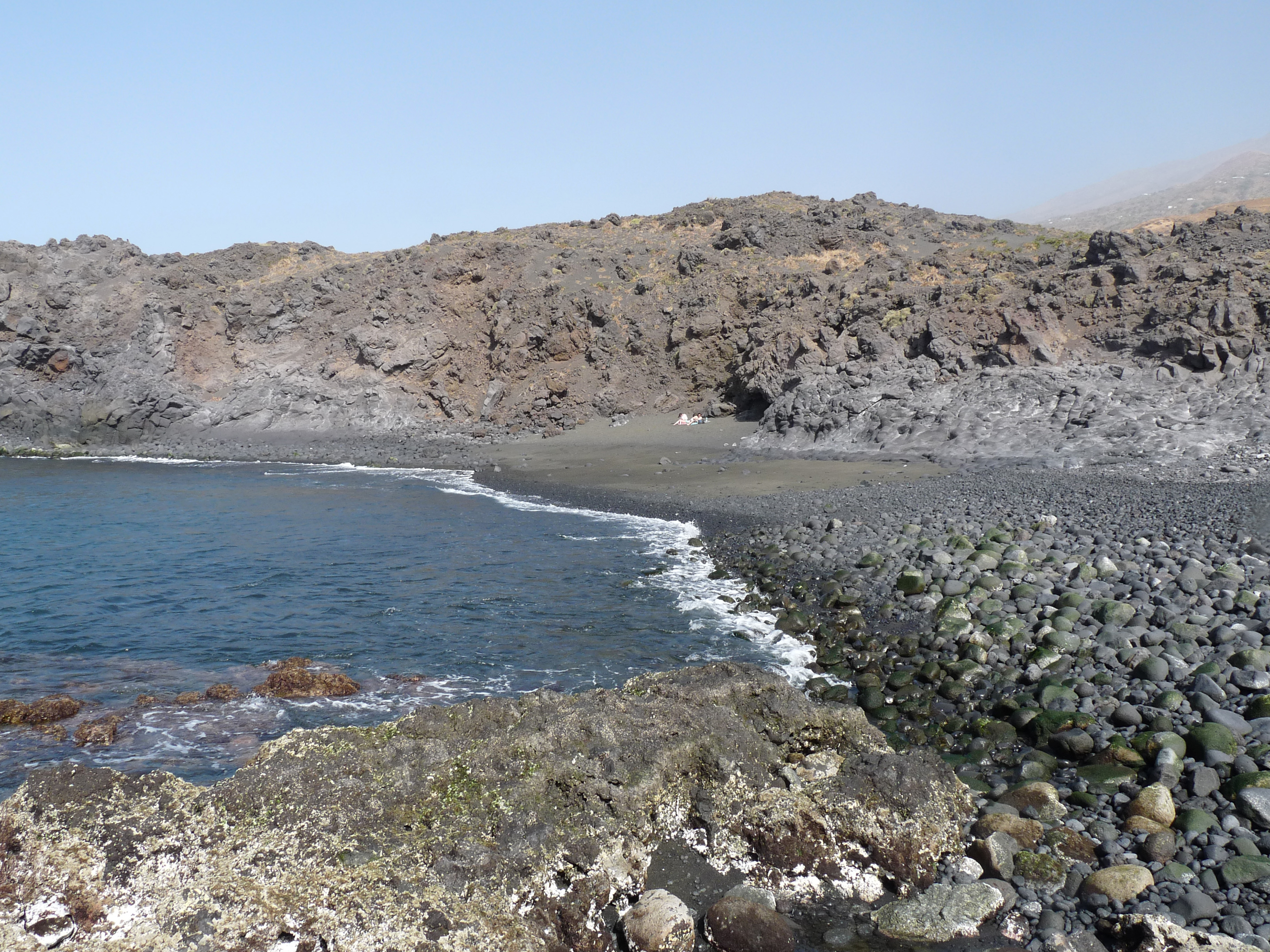
Beach Ponta da Salina.

Ponta da Salina is a headland close to the village. There is a small natural harbour and a bay with basalt rock formations, one of which looks like a natural arch. There are some natural swimming pools and a dark sand beach where swimming is possible if the sea is not too rough. There is a sightworthy old cemetery, which is surrounded by a wall, close to the beach. Most of the graves have very simple wooden crosses without any names.
