= Campanas Baixo =

- Settlement
- Coordinates: 15.017°N 24.410°W
- Country: Cape Verde
- Island: Fogo
- Municipality: São Filipe
- Civil parish: São Lourenço

Population (2010)
  - Total: 783
- ID: 82102

Campanas Baixo is a settlement in the northern part of the island of Fogo, Cape Verde. It is situated 2 km east of São Jorge, 2 km southwest of Atalaia and 16 km northeast of the island capital São Filipe.

== See also ==
- List of villages and settlements in Cape Verde
