= Curral Grande =

- Settlement
- Coordinates: 14.959°N 24.457°W
- Country: Cape Verde
- Island: Fogo
- Municipality: São Filipe
- Civil parish: São Lourenço
- Elevation: 289 m (948 ft)

Population (2010)
  - Total: 398
- ID: 82104

Curral Grande is a settlement in the western part of the island of Fogo, Cape Verde. It is situated 8 km northeast of the island capital São Filipe. In 2010 its population was 398. The village sits at 289 meters above sea level.

== See also ==
- List of villages and settlements in Cape Verde
