= Lawrence's Hotel =

Hotel in Sintra, Portugal

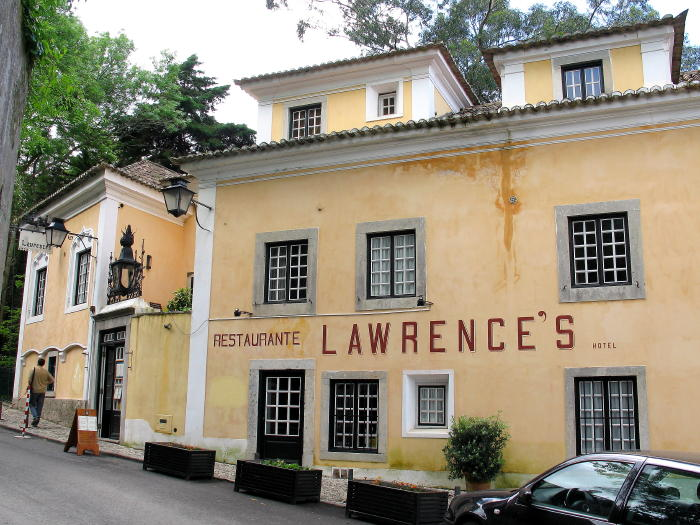
Lawrence's Hotel in the centre of Sintra

Lawrence's Hotel is in Sintra, a UNESCO World Heritage Site, in the Lisbon District of Portugal. Opened in 1764, it is reputedly the oldest, still-functioning, hotel on the Iberian Peninsula, although it has not been open continuously.

== History ==
Prior to becoming a hotel, the building was an inn, which was run by an Irish lady, Daisy O'Camidy. Purchased by Lewis Lawrence, who may have arrived in Portugal during the Peninsular War, it was renamed Lawrence's Hotel. It has since been sold several times and has undergone several name changes. In 1850 it was called the English Inn. It was purchased after 1880 by an Englishman named Durand, who renamed it after himself. At the end of the 19th Century it was bought by an Irishman, Michael David Gallwey, who leased part of the premises to Álvaro Simões to establish a pastry shop whose speciality became pastéis de feijão (bean pastries). In 1935 it was purchased by a Czech lady, Maria Janavcova, who reconstructed it, re-opening the hotel in 1949 as the Estalagem dos Cavaleiros (Knights' Inn). It closed in 1961 and was purchased by the Guedes de Sousa family, before being sold to a Dutch couple named Bos in 1989. They restored the building and returned the hotel to its original name, re-opening it in the early 1990s. It changed ownership again in 2016.

Over the years the hotel has played host to some important guests. In 1809 Lord Byron wrote part of his famous work Childe Harold's Pilgrimage while staying there, describing Sintra as a “paradise”. The Portuguese novelist José Maria de Eça de Queirós stayed there on several occasions and made reference to the Lawrence in his novels Os Maias and The Mystery of the Sintra Road. Other Portuguese writers to stay there have included Alexandre Herculano, Ramalho Ortigão, Camilo Castelo Branco, and Álvaro Bulhão Pato. The English writer William Beckford was also a guest as, much later, were Bill Clinton and Margaret Thatcher.
