= List of Cape Verde regions by Human Development Index =

This is a list of Cape Verde regions by Human Development Index as of 2023, including Praia, the capital and largest city.

Rank	Region	HDI (2023)
High human development
1	Santiago-Praia	0.703
Medium human development
2	São Vicente	0.692
3	Fogo	0.674
	Cape Verde	0.668
4	Santo Antão	0.649
5	Santiago-Interior	0.612
