= Ponta Verde, Cape Verde =

Ponta Verde
- Settlement
- Coordinates: 14.985°N 24.461°W
- Country: Cape Verde
- Island: Fogo
- Municipality: São Filipe
- Civil parish: São Lourenço

Population (2010)
  - Total: 1,072
- ID: 82109

Ponta Verde is a town in the northwestern part of the island of Fogo, Cape Verde. In 2010 its population was 1,072. It is situated 11 km northeast of the island capital São Filipe.

== See also ==
- List of cities and towns in Cape Verde
