= Carlos de Vasconcelos =

Portuguese politician and journalist

Minister of Colonies
- In office 1924–1925
- Preceded by: Álvaro Bulhão Pato
- Succeeded by: Henrique Paço d'Arcos

Personal details
- Born: 6 September 1883 Fogo, Cape Verde
- Died: July 29, 1928 (aged 44) Praia, Cape Verde

Carlos de Vasconcelos (6 September 1883 – 28 July 1928) was a Portuguese politician and journalist, born in Colonial Cape Verde.

== Career ==
Vasconcelos was a Minister of Portuguese Colonies under the José Domingues do Santos government from 22 November 1924 to 15 February 1925.

He was an alumni at the Escola de Guerra (War School) in Lisbon and worked at the customs house for the province of Cape Verde on June 2, 1905 in Fogo. A Republican person since he was a student, he supported the Proclamation of the Portuguese Republic as the Evolutionist Party member.

He was elected and on January 2, 1944, became the president of the Municipality of Fogo Island. He was later deputy of Cape Verde in 1922 and was considered one of the greatest orators of the Portuguese Parliament.

He was the founder of the journal A Acção: Orgão do Partido Republicano e defensor dos interesses da Província de Cabo Verde [The Action: Organizing the Republican Party and Defending the Interests in the Province of Cape Verde] (1921–22), he took part in Cape Verdean journals including A Voz de Cabo Verde (Voice of Cape Verde), O Progresso (The Progress) in which he was a drafter, O Futuro de Cabo Verde (The Future of Cape Verde) with the director José do Sacramento Monteiro, his nephew. He took part in writing continental newspapers including República and Popular e Gazeta das Colónias. He had taken part in a collaboration under his authority in the review Contemporânea [Contemporary] (1915–26).

He also published Vôos d'Ícaro (Icarus' Voice) in Coimbra in 1901 alongside João R. de Moura Marques

Preceded by Álvaro Bulhão Pato	Minister of the Colonies (Portugal); 1924-1925	Succeeded by Henrique Paço d'Arcos
