= São Lourenço (São Filipe) =

- Civil parish
- Coordinates: 14.98°N 24.44°W
- Country: Cape Verde
- Island: Fogo
- Municipality: São Filipe

Area
  - Total: 96 km^{2} (37 sq mi)

Population (2010)
  - Total: 8,899
  - Density: 93/km^{2} (240/sq mi)
- ID: 821

São Lourenço is a freguesia (civil parish) of Cape Verde. It covers the northern part of the municipality of São Filipe, on the island of Fogo. The parish has an area of 96 km^{2}. It is also a religious parish, its religious celebration is on August 10, day of Saint Lawrence.

== Settlements ==
The freguesia consists of the following settlements, its population data was of the 2010 census:

- Achada Mentirosa (pop: 344)
- As Hortas (pop: 380)
- Campanas Baixo (pop: 783)
- Campanas Cima (pop: 375)
- Chã de Monte (pop: 118)
- Curral Grande (pop: 398)
- Galinheiro (pop: 877)
- Inhuco (pop: 517)
- Lomba (pop: 731)
- Monte Tabor (pop: 170)
- Pedro Homem (pop: 315)
- Pico Gomes (pop: 118)
- Ponta Verde (pop: 1,072, town)
- Ribeira Filipe (pop: 548)
- Santo António (pop: 530)
- São Domingos (pop: 315)
- São Jorge (pop: 635)
- Velho Manuel (pop: 604)

== Demographics ==
Year	Population
2000 (Census)	9,715
2010 (Census)	8,899

== Notable people ==
- Henrique Teixeira de Sousa, a doctor and an author was native to the parish

== Sports ==
The football/soccer club União de São Lourenço is the sports team of the parish, it is based in Curral Grande. Another football (soccer) club is Valência based in As Hortas in the middle.
