= Álvaro Bulhão Pato =

Portuguese politician and writer

Álvaro Bulhão Pato (1840 – 14 February 1936) was a Portuguese politician and a writer, during the First Portuguese Republic, he was mayor of Angra do Heroísmo in the Azores, he was senator in two legislatures in the Portuguese Ministry of the Colonies during the government of Rodrigues Gaspar from 6 July to 22 November 1924 He succeeded Mariano Martins and was succeeded by Carlos de Vasconcelos.

== Biography ==
He worked as an official and was elevated to a rank of an inspector.

He was director of a customs house in Angra do Heroísmo, and remained until it became a republic where he became president of the municipality and a judge in Angra do Heroísmo.

He was previously director of the customs house of Portuguese West Africa.

He was senator in two legislatures from 6 July to 22 November 1924 as Minister of the Colonies during the 40th government of the First Republic under Alfredo Rodrigues Gaspar. It was in favour of autonomy in the Portuguese Colonies

He published numerous works, one of them Na Brecha

== Published works ==
He published and contributed a large number of works and periodicals, he was author on one of these including:

- Na Brecha. Angra do Heroísmo : Typ. Sousa e Andrade, 1910 (p. 216);
- O tempo : da monarchia à república. [The Time: The Monarchy or the Republic] Lisbon : Liv. Ferin 1913 (p. 316).

Preceded by Mariano Martins	Minister of the Colonies (Portugal); 1924	Succeeded by Carlos de Vasconcelos
