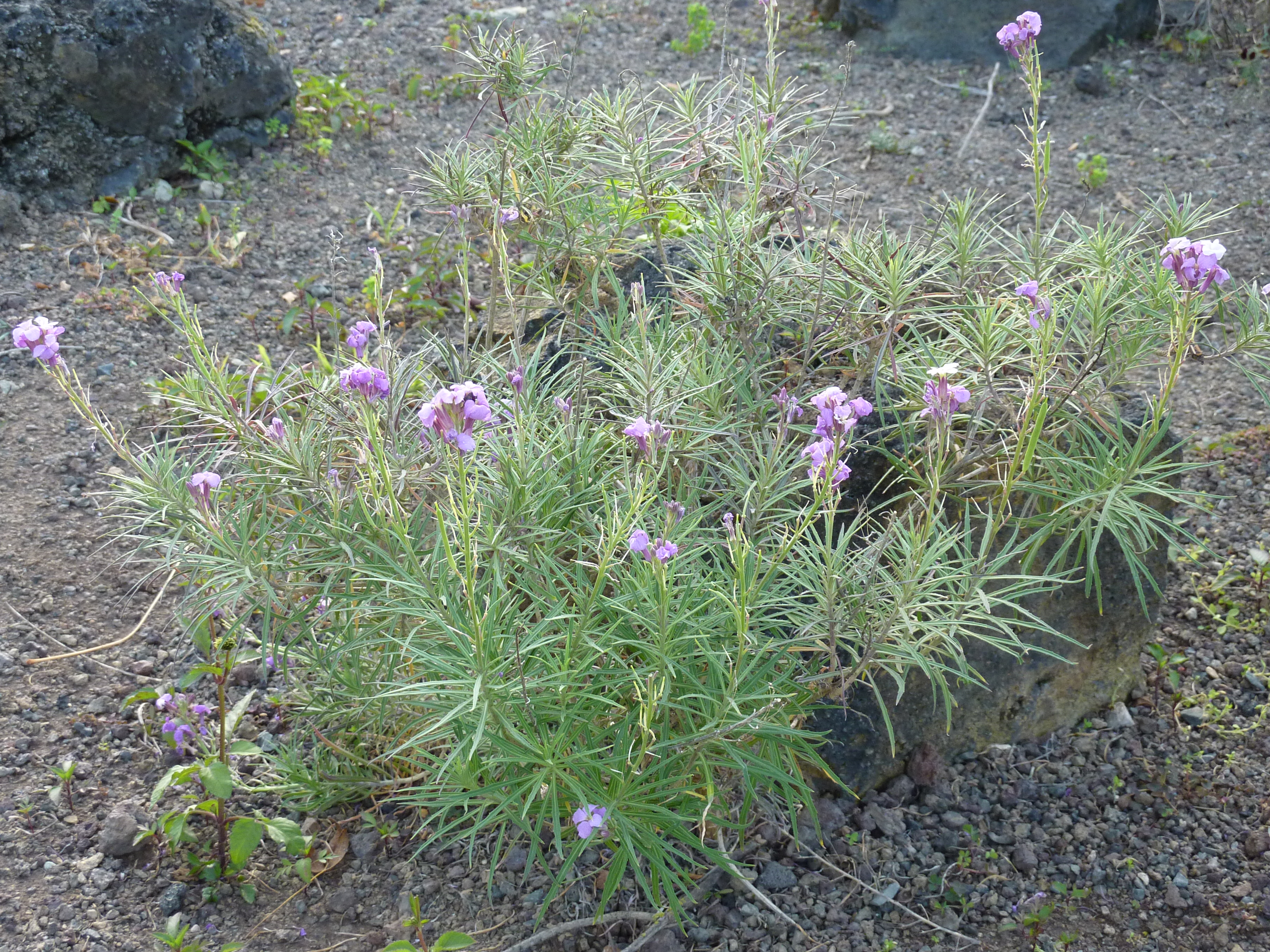
- Erysimum caboverdeanum at the Botanical Garden in Las Palmas de Gran Canaria

Conservation status
- Critically Endangered (IUCN 3.1)

Scientific classification
- Kingdom: Plantae
- Clade: Tracheophytes
- Clade: Angiosperms
- Clade: Eudicots
- Clade: Rosids
- Order: Brassicales
- Family: Brassicaceae
- Genus: Erysimum
- Species: E. caboverdeanum

Binomial name
- Erysimum caboverdeanum (A.Chev) Sunding, 1974

Synonyms
- Matthiola caboverdeana A.Chev, 1935

= Erysimum caboverdeanum =

Species of flowering plant

Erysimum caboverdeanum is a species of flowering plants of the family Brassicaceae. The species is endemic to Cape Verde. It is listed as a critically endangered plant by the IUCN. The species was first described by Auguste Chevalier in 1935 as Matthiola caboverdeana; it was placed into the genus Erysimum by Per Øgle Sunding in 1974. Its local name is cravo-brabo ("wild carnation"). It is used in traditional medicine.

== Description ==
The plant is a small shrub, reaching around 60 cm height. Its narrow leaves are up to 4 cm long and 0.2 cm wide. The flowers are lilac colored, the fruits are very narrow, up to 6 cm long and stand upright.

== Distribution and ecology ==
Erysimum caboverdeanum is restricted to the island of Fogo, where it occurs between 1,600 and 2,000 metres elevation.
