= São Filipe, Cape Verde =

São Filipe
- Settlement
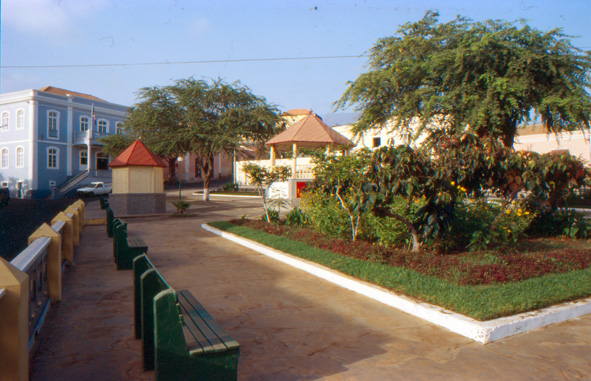
- Square in São Filipe

- Location within Cape Verde
- Coordinates: 14.895°N 24.498°W
- Country: Cape Verde
- Island: Fogo
- Municipality: São Filipe
- Civil parish: Nossa Senhora da Conceição
- Elevation: 77 m (253 ft)

Population (2010)
  - Total: 8,122
- Postal code: 8220
- ID: 82203

São Filipe (Portuguese for "Saint Philip") is a city on the west coast of Africa on the island of Fogo, Cape Verde. It is the capital of the island, and the seat of the São Filipe Municipality. The island's airport, São Filipe Airport, is located on the southeastern edge of the town and the island's port is 4 km north of the center at Vale de Cavaleiros. The town's elevation is 20 meters.

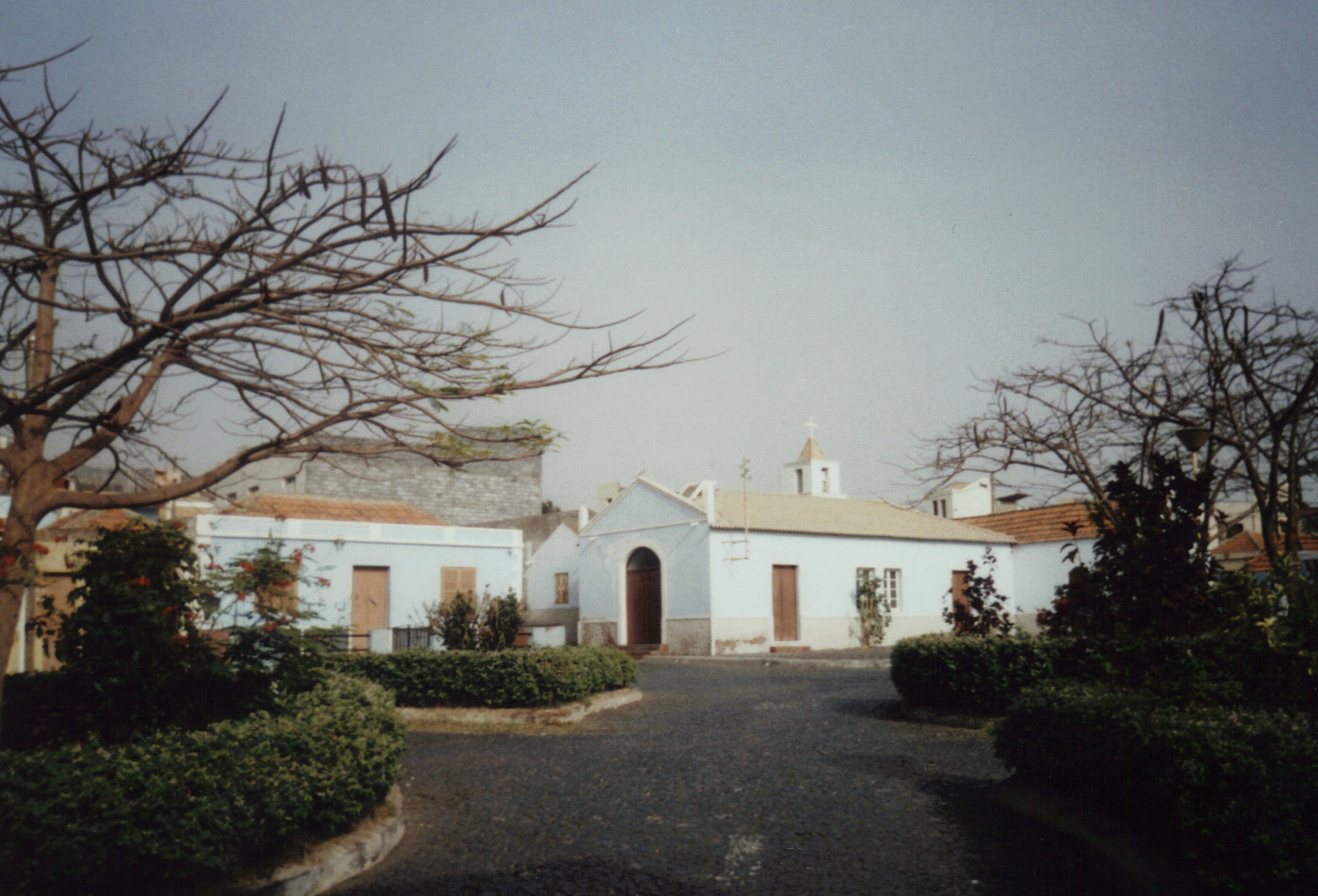
Chapel at Praça Alberto da Silva

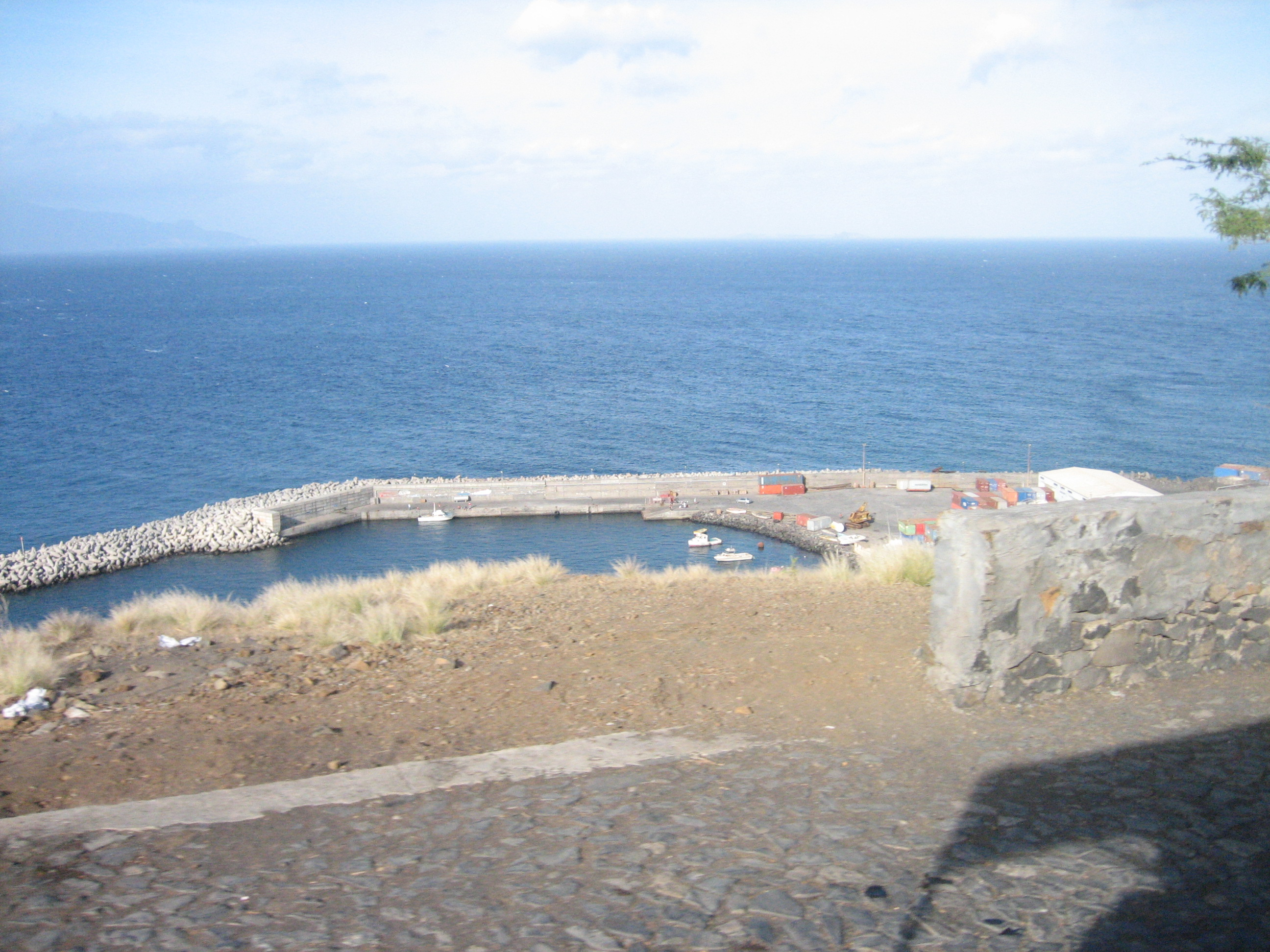
Porto de Vale de Cavaleiros

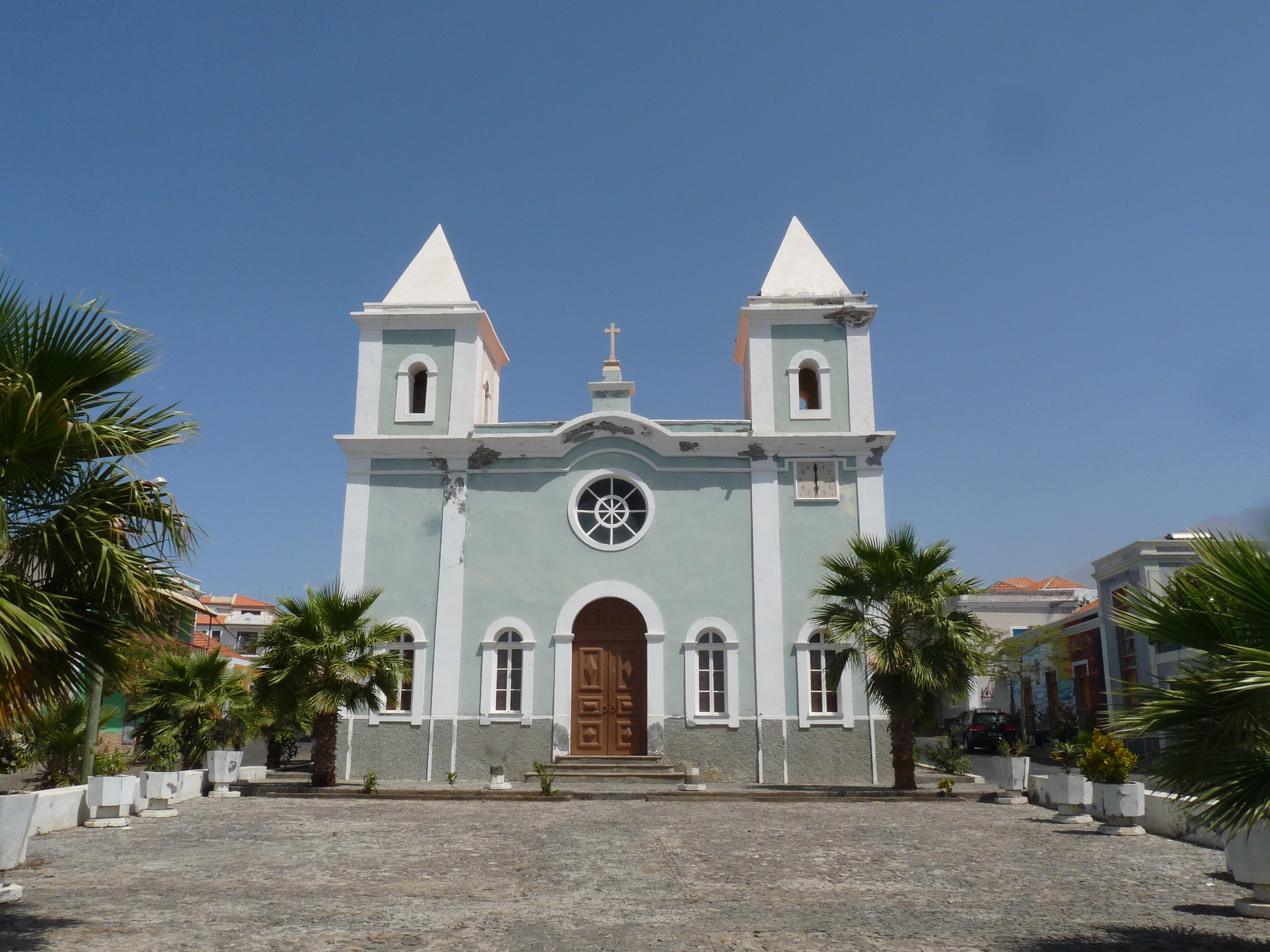
Nossa Senhora da Conceição (Our Lady of Conception) church

== History ==
São Filipe was founded in the 16th century and is considered to be the second oldest town in Cape Verde after Ribeira Grande, but a town charter was not granted before 1922. It prospered due to the cultivation of cotton, which was sold on the African coast. In 1655 São Filipe was destroyed by Flemish pirates. In the 18th century it went into economic stagnation, as did Ribeira Grande. The cultivation of cotton was replaced by wine, coffee and jatropha (for oil and soap production), which led to an economical upswing in the 19th century. Representative town houses (sobrados) were built in the city centre, around the parish church. Currently, 70% of the houses in the city centre date from the 19th century.

== Sights ==
- The historic city center, called Bila Baxo. It is known for its colonial architecture. Since 2000, many houses have been renovated. Many houses have a colourful or richly decorated façade, wooden balconies or bay windows. In addition to picturesque streets with smaller colonial houses there are about 50 representative mansions to be seen. The historic centre of São Filipe is on the tentative list of World Heritage Sites.
- One of the most representative buildings is the city hall (Camara Municipal) which was built in 1928. It is at a sightworthy place called Praça 12 de Setembro where a small park and a wooden pavilion are worth a visit.
- The most important catholic church of the town is Nossa Senhora da Conceição which was built in a comparatively simple style in 1849. The church with its two impressive clock towers was renovated several times. The last renovation was completed in 2007. Opposite the church there are several well-preserved colonial houses dating from the 18th century.
- The Market Hall is at the border of Bila Baxo to the more modern part of the city at Praça Francisco de Assis, the busiest place. The most important bus stop and the post office are here as well.
- The Museum Casa da Memória is at Praça 12 de Setembro in a merchant's house which was built in 1820. The neighbouring house is the municipal museum (Museu Municipal). In its inner court several endemic plants of Fogo, some of which are endangered species, were planted, e.g. Crabo bravo (Erysimum caboverdiana) and Língua de vaca (Echium vulcanorum). A small house (Funco) was rebuilt in the traditional style using volcanic stones. A part of the pavement of the inner court consists of basalt stones.
- The historic place Praça Serpa Pinto is in the northwest of the center about 40 m above the beach Praia da Bila consisting of black volcanic sand. There are several colonial houses, monuments and a small parc. The view point Miradouro da Bila Baxo in the northern part of the place offers a beautiful view of the beach and the neighbouring island of Brava.
- A part of the fortress Fortim Carlota dating from 1667 is preserved in the southern part. An impressive canon can be seen in front. The building was used as a prison until 2005.
- In the south of the center, the old cemetery Antigo Cemitério, which was used until the end of the 20th century, is worth a visit. There are several graves in a classic style dating from the 19th century.
- Outside the historic city center, Praça Alberto da Silva, a rectangular place with a small park and a chapel in a typical residential area seldom visited by tourists, is worth a visit. There are several shops, a bakery and a small internet café. The place offers a beautiful view of a part of the city and its surroundings.
- Apart from Nossa Senhora da Conceição, the oldest Catholic church, there are sightworthy chapels at Praça Alberto da Silva, a New Apostolic Church and two wards of the Church of Jesus Christ of Latter-day Saints.

== Beaches ==
Praia da Bila, a black beach, is 40 m below the city center. It is not very clean, and on many days the sea is very rough.

The inhabitants of the city prefer the beach at the harbour Porto de Vale de Cavaleiros, about 4 km in the north of Sao Filipe which is the island's westernmost point and one of few that it is an artificial section of land, others in Cape Verde are Ponta do Sol on Santo Antão. In spite of the harbour, the water is cleaner and the sea is not so rough. The most popular beach of the island is Ponta da Sallina in São Jorge.

== Demography ==
Population of the town of São Filipe (1980–present)
1980	1990	2010
4,370	5,616	8,112

== Climate ==
São Filipe has a hot desert climate (Köppen BWh). The average temperature is 24.2 °C (75.6 °F). Average annual rainfall is 272 millimetres or 10.71 inches.

Climate data for São Filipe, 113 metres or 371 feet ASL
Month	Jan	Feb	Mar	Apr	May	Jun	Jul	Aug	Sep	Oct	Nov	Dec	Year
Mean daily maximum °C (°F)	25.6 (78.1)	25.6 (78.1)	26.2 (79.2)	26.7 (80.1)	27.1 (80.8)	27.8 (82.0)	28.4 (83.1)	28.7 (83.7)	29.1 (84.4)	29.0 (84.2)	28.6 (83.5)	26.4 (79.5)	27.4 (81.4)
Daily mean °C (°F)	22.3 (72.1)	22.1 (71.8)	22.6 (72.7)	23.0 (73.4)	23.7 (74.7)	24.3 (75.7)	25.1 (77.2)	25.7 (78.3)	26.2 (79.2)	26.3 (79.3)	25.2 (77.4)	23.5 (74.3)	24.2 (75.5)
Mean daily minimum °C (°F)	19.1 (66.4)	18.7 (65.7)	19.0 (66.2)	19.4 (66.9)	20.3 (68.5)	20.8 (69.4)	21.8 (71.2)	22.8 (73.0)	23.3 (73.9)	23.7 (74.7)	21.9 (71.4)	20.6 (69.1)	21.0 (69.7)
Average rainfall mm (inches)	3 (0.1)	2 (0.1)	0 (0)	0 (0)	0 (0)	0 (0)	14 (0.6)	81 (3.2)	121 (4.8)	35 (1.4)	11 (0.4)	5 (0.2)	272 (10.8)
Source: Climate-Data.ORG

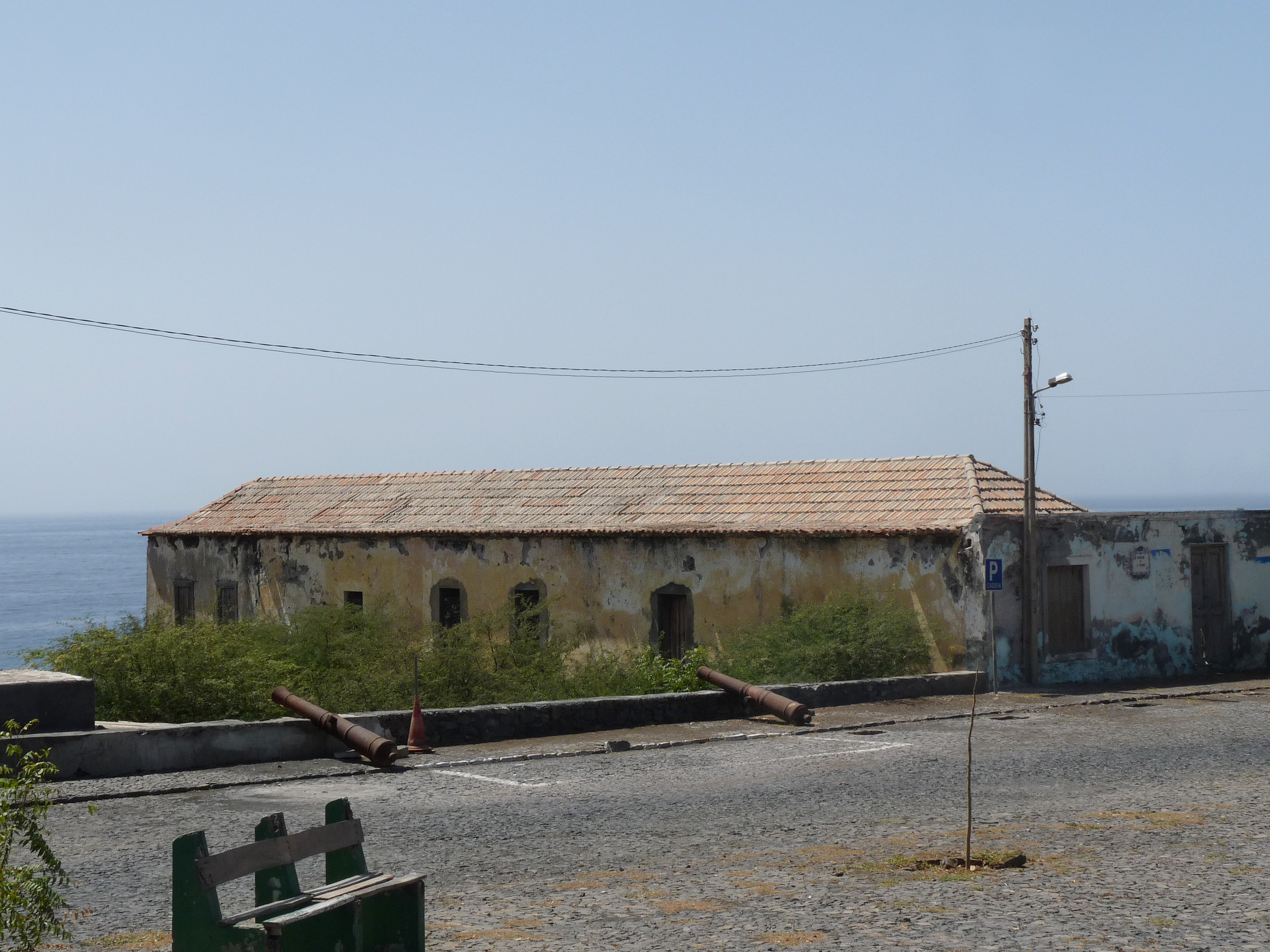
Fortress Fortim Carlota

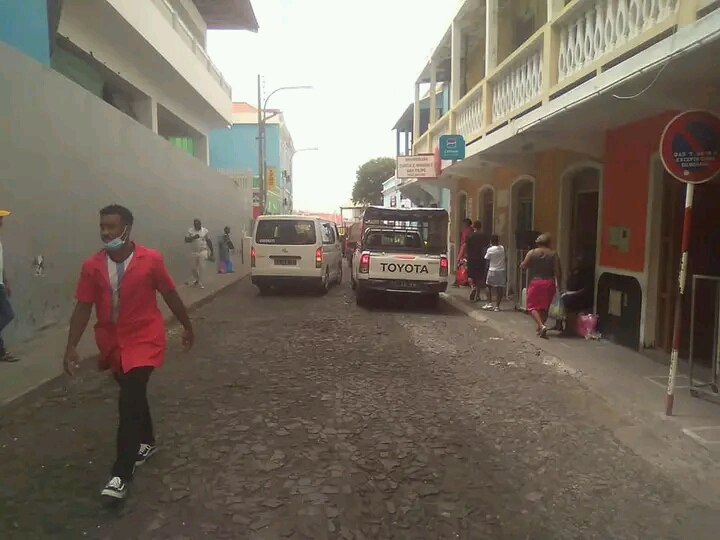
A typical street in São Filipe

== Notable people ==
- Pedro Pires, first Prime Minister and 3rd President of Cape Verde

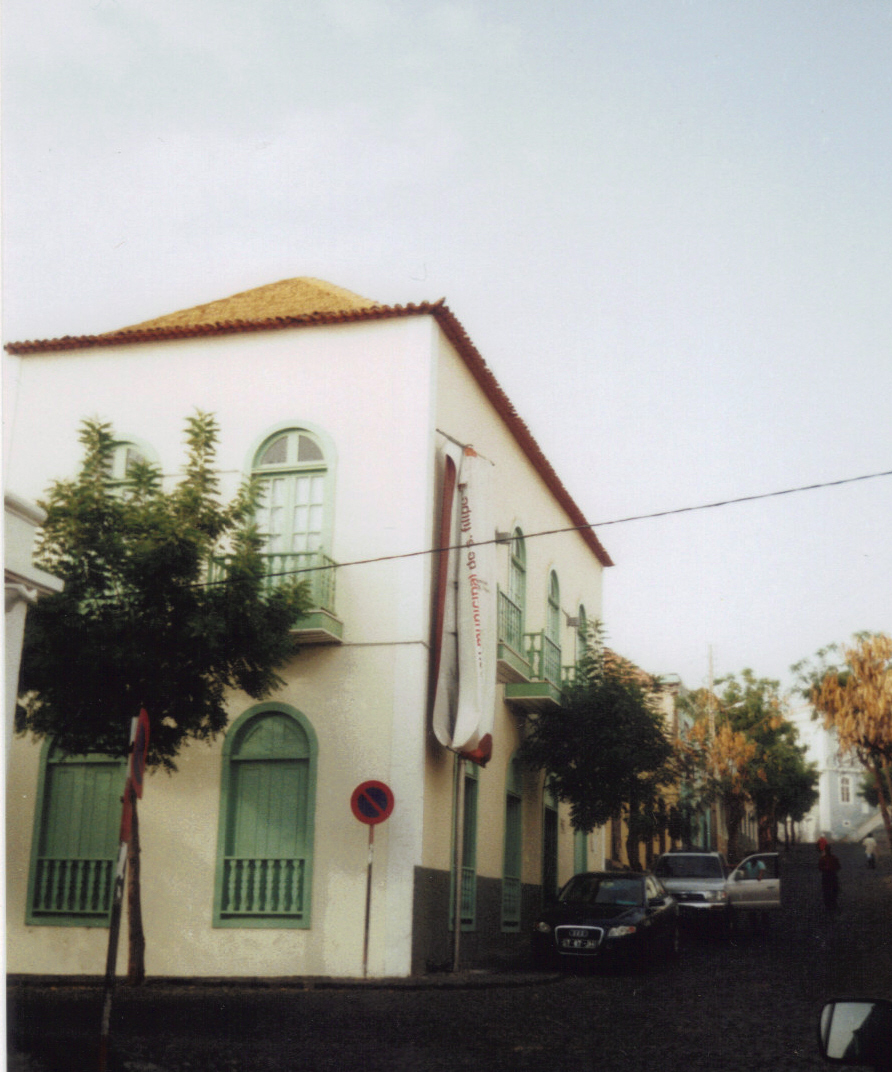
Museum

== Sports ==
The city has its stadiums – the Estadio 5 de Julho which is used for football (soccer) and a multisport complex named Simão Mendes used for basketball and volleyball games.

Académica do Fogo, Botafogo and Vulcânicos are the town's football clubs, they are also the island's most popular.

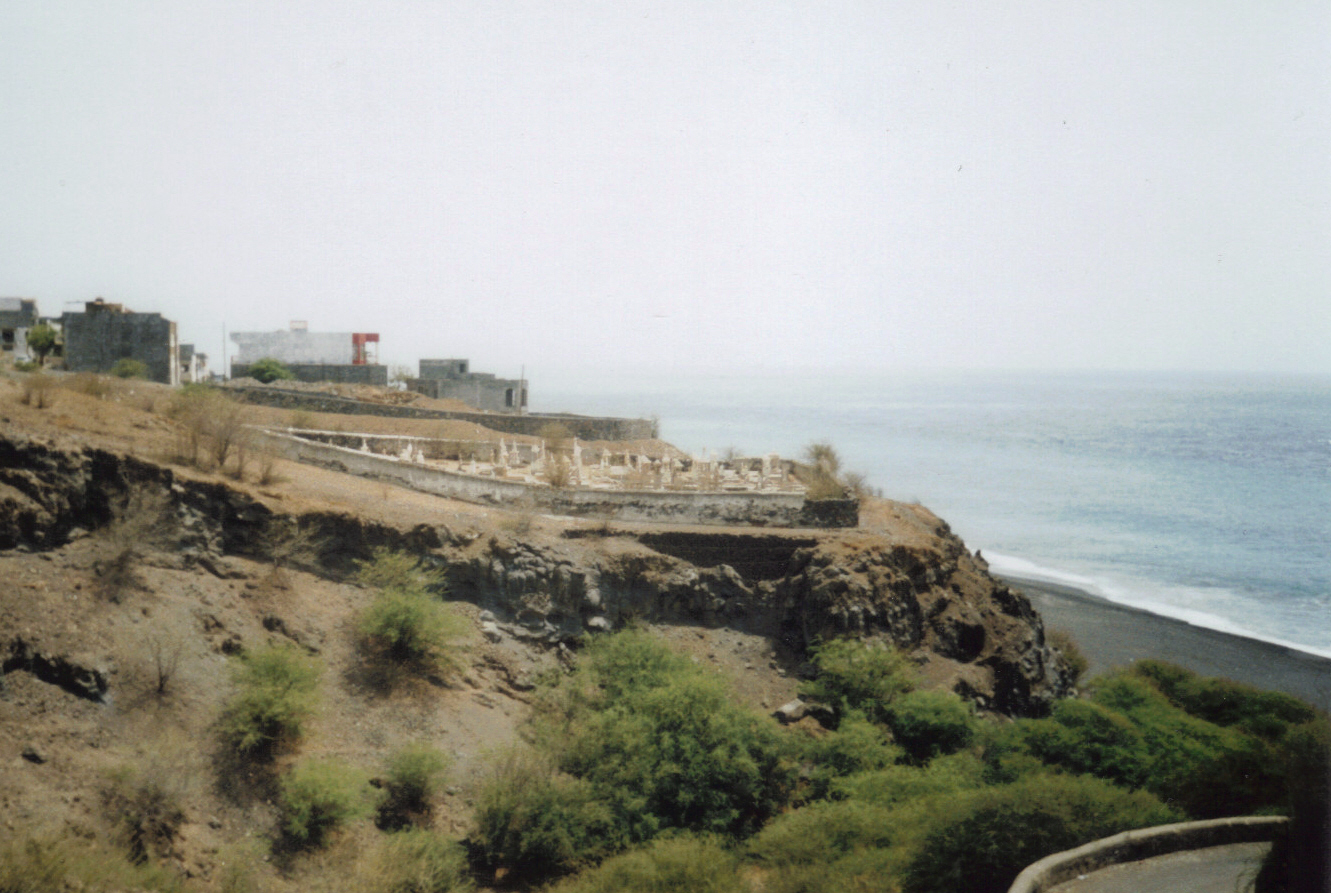
Beach and old cemetery.

== Gallery ==
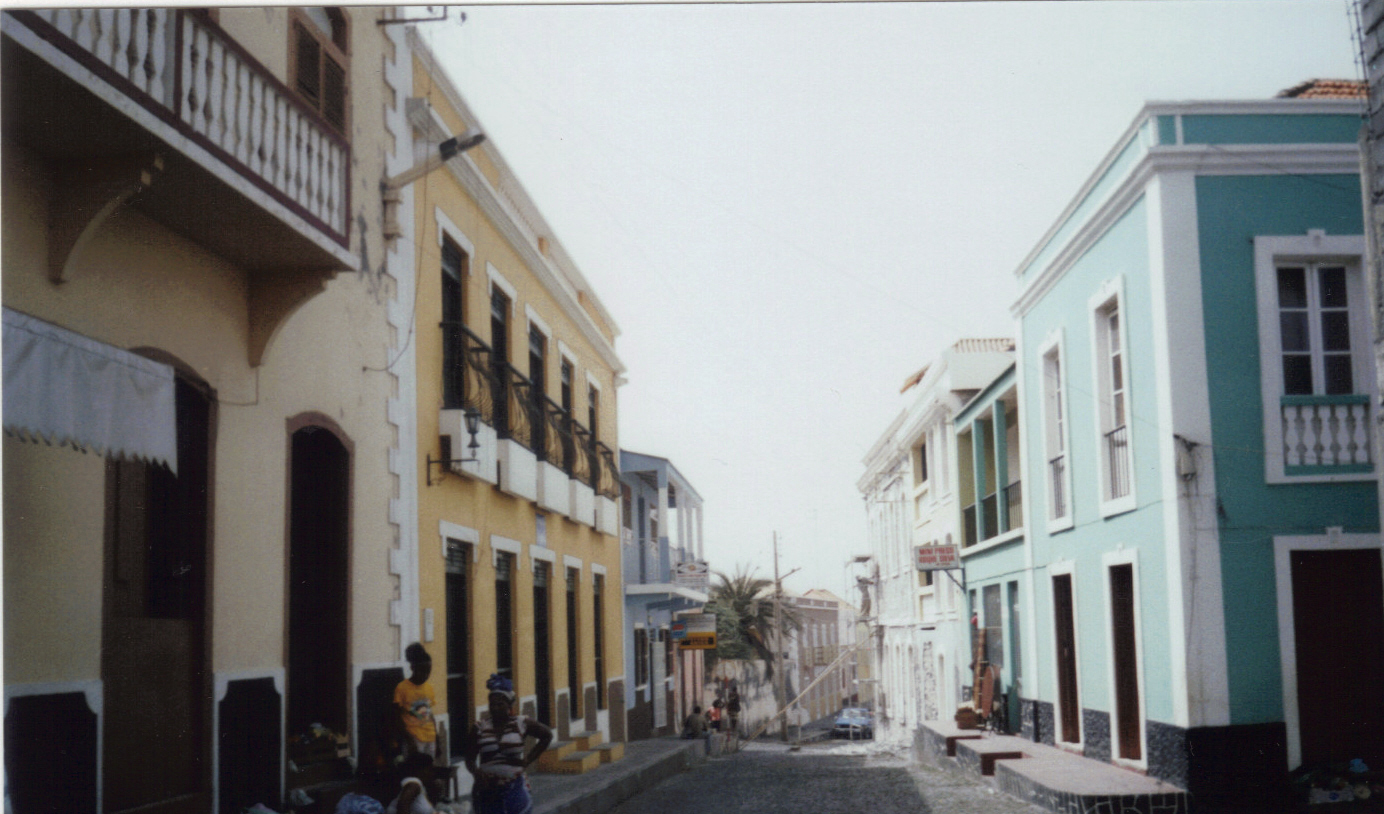
Colonial architecture.

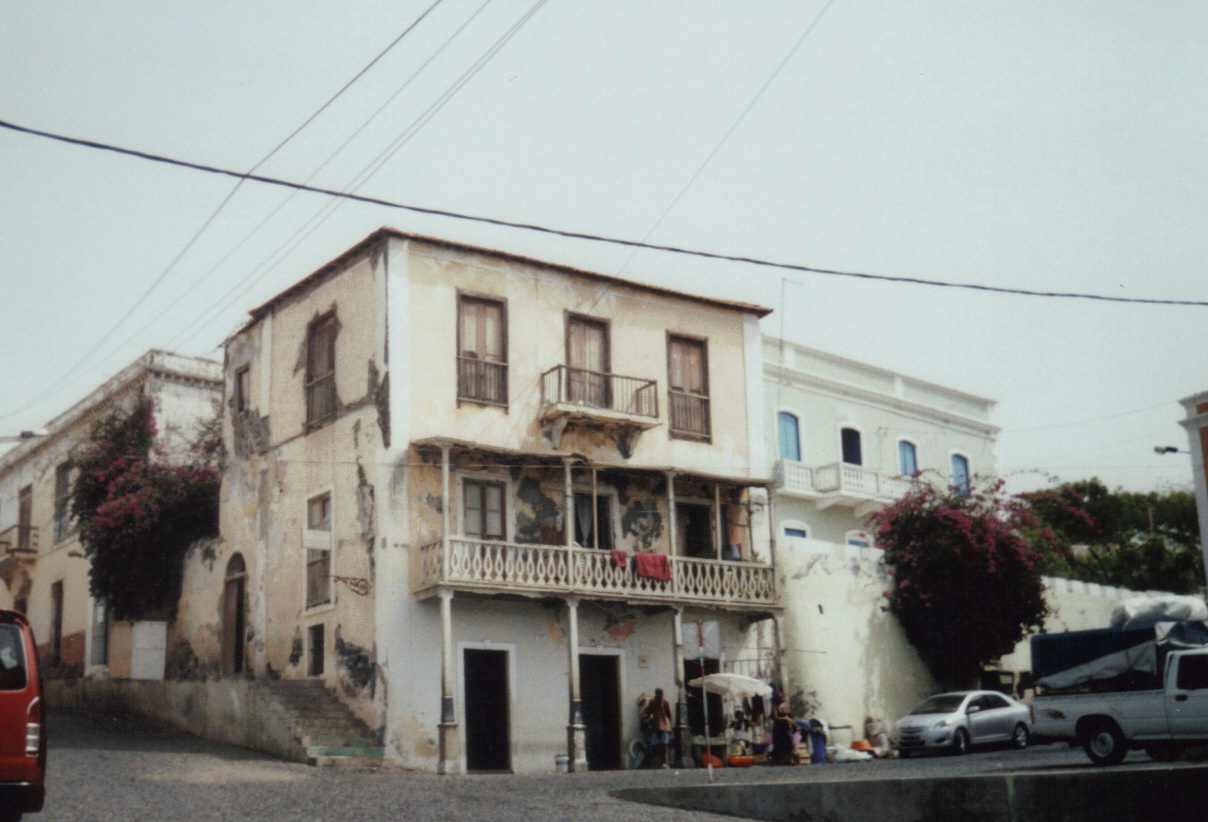
Colonial architecture.

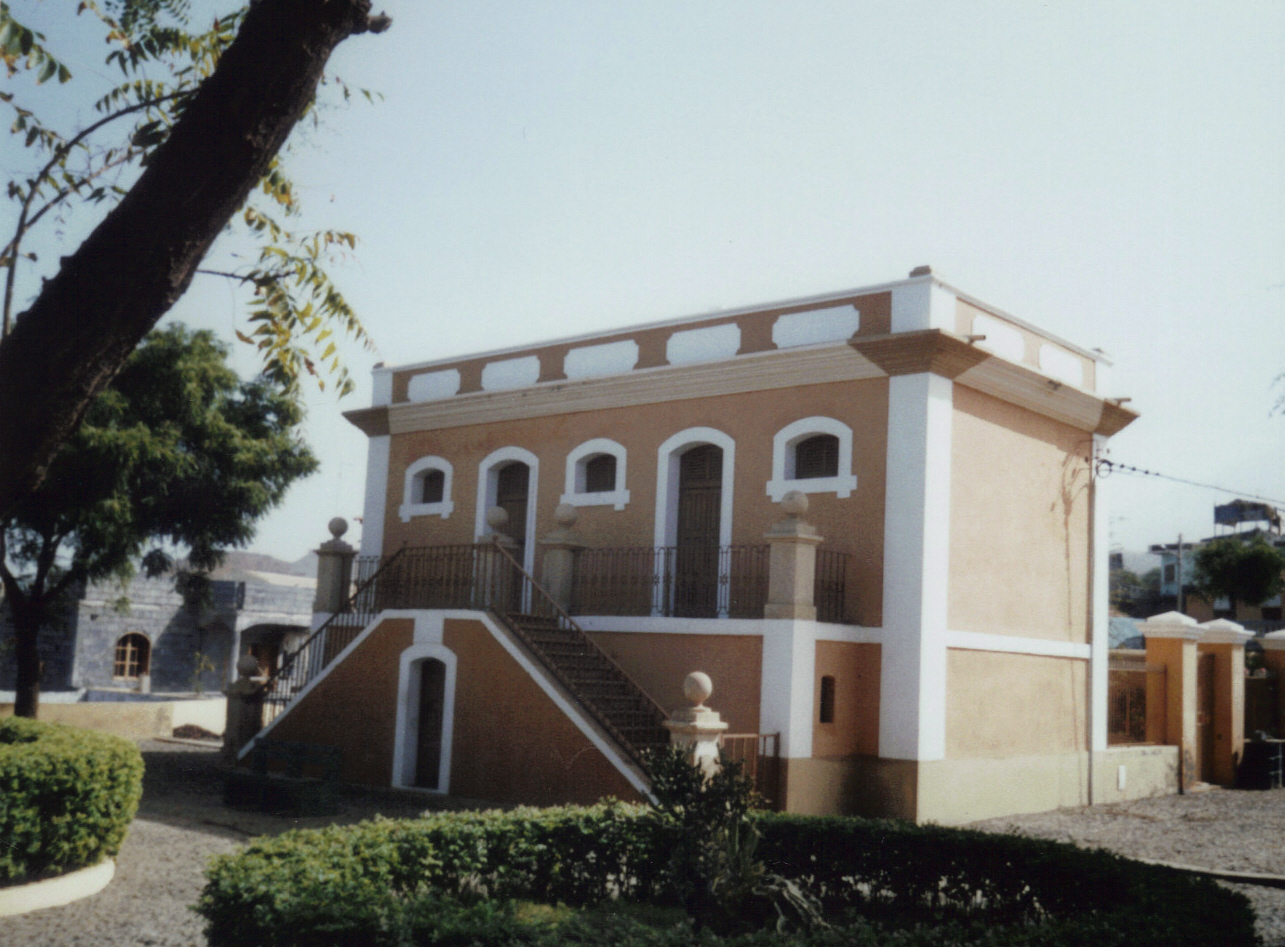
Colonial mansion (Sobrado).

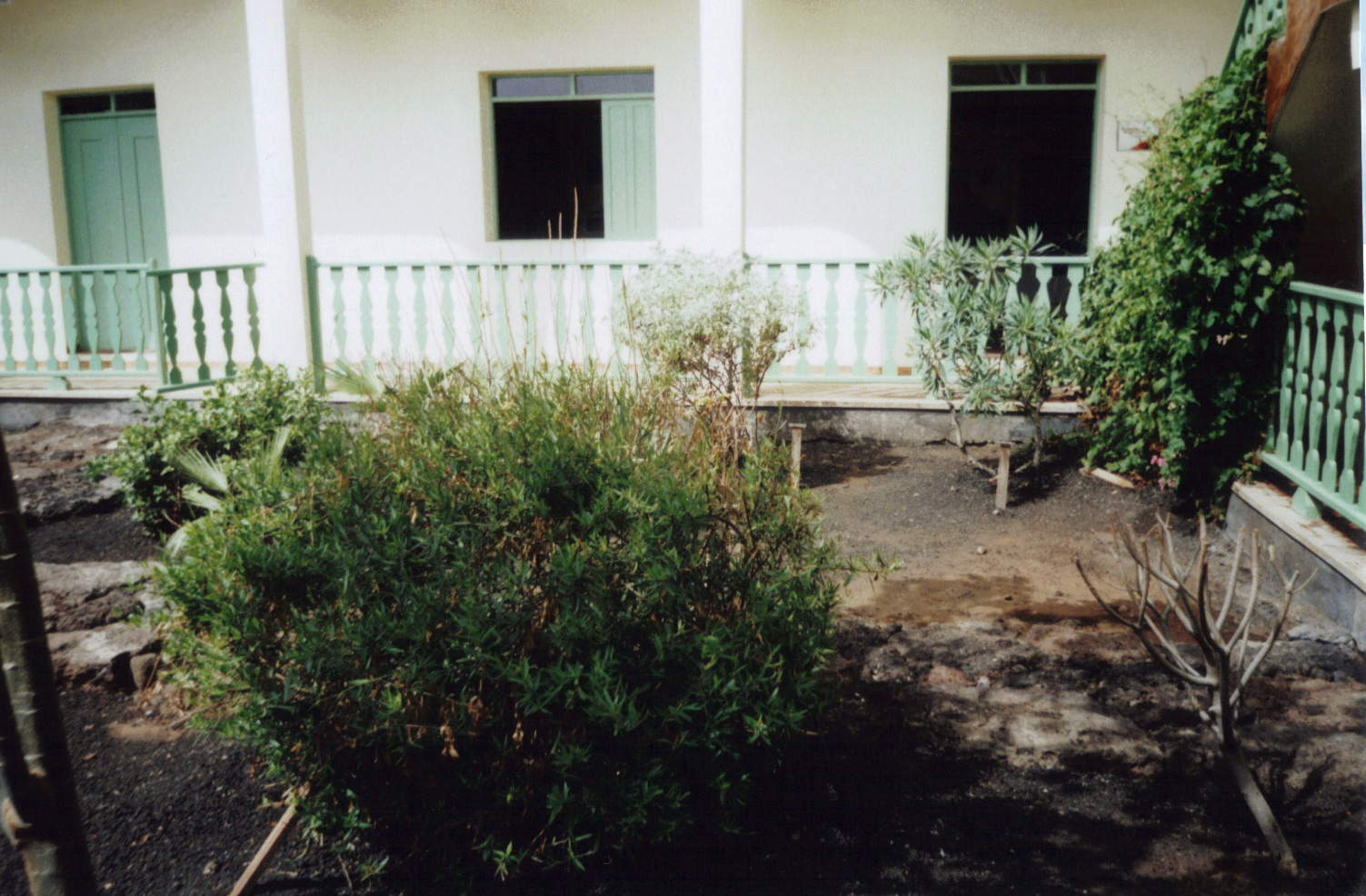
Endemic plants in the inner court of the museum.

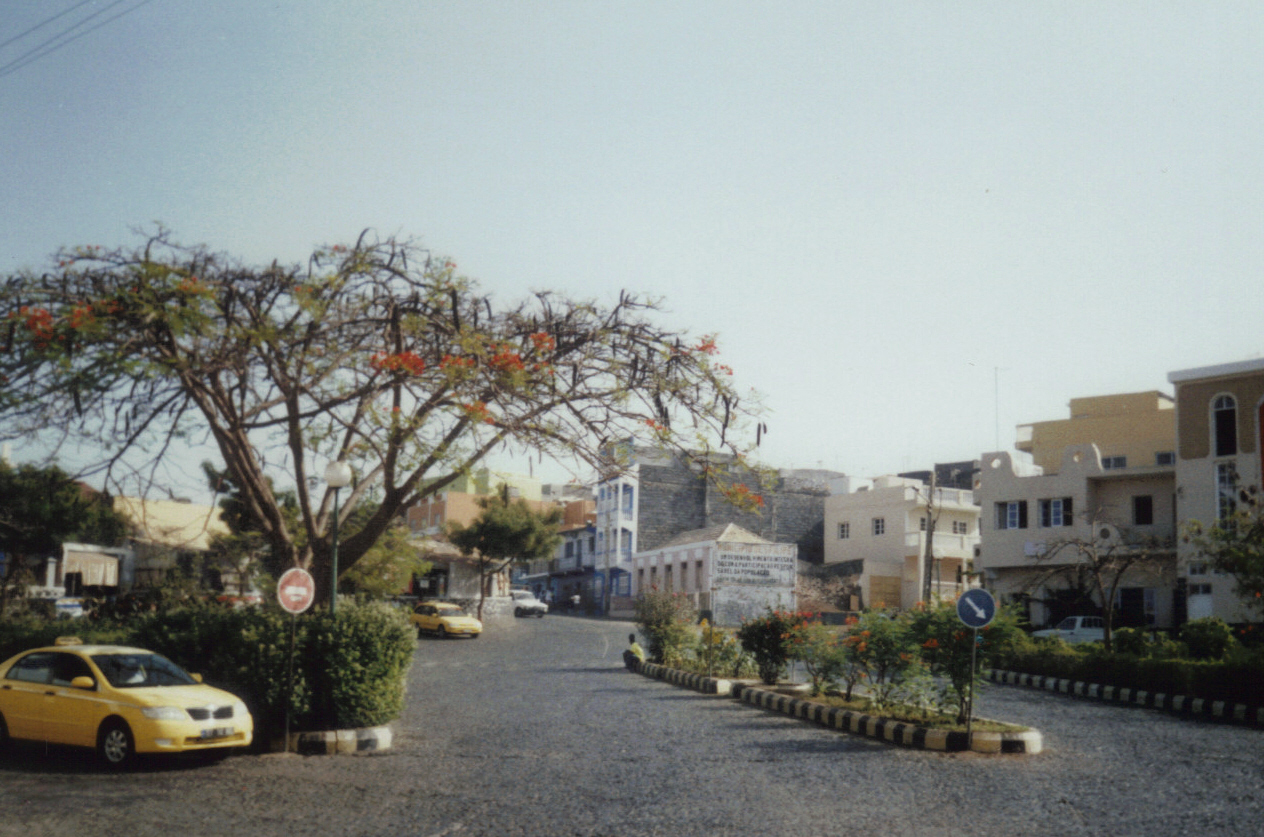
Praça Francisco d'Assis.

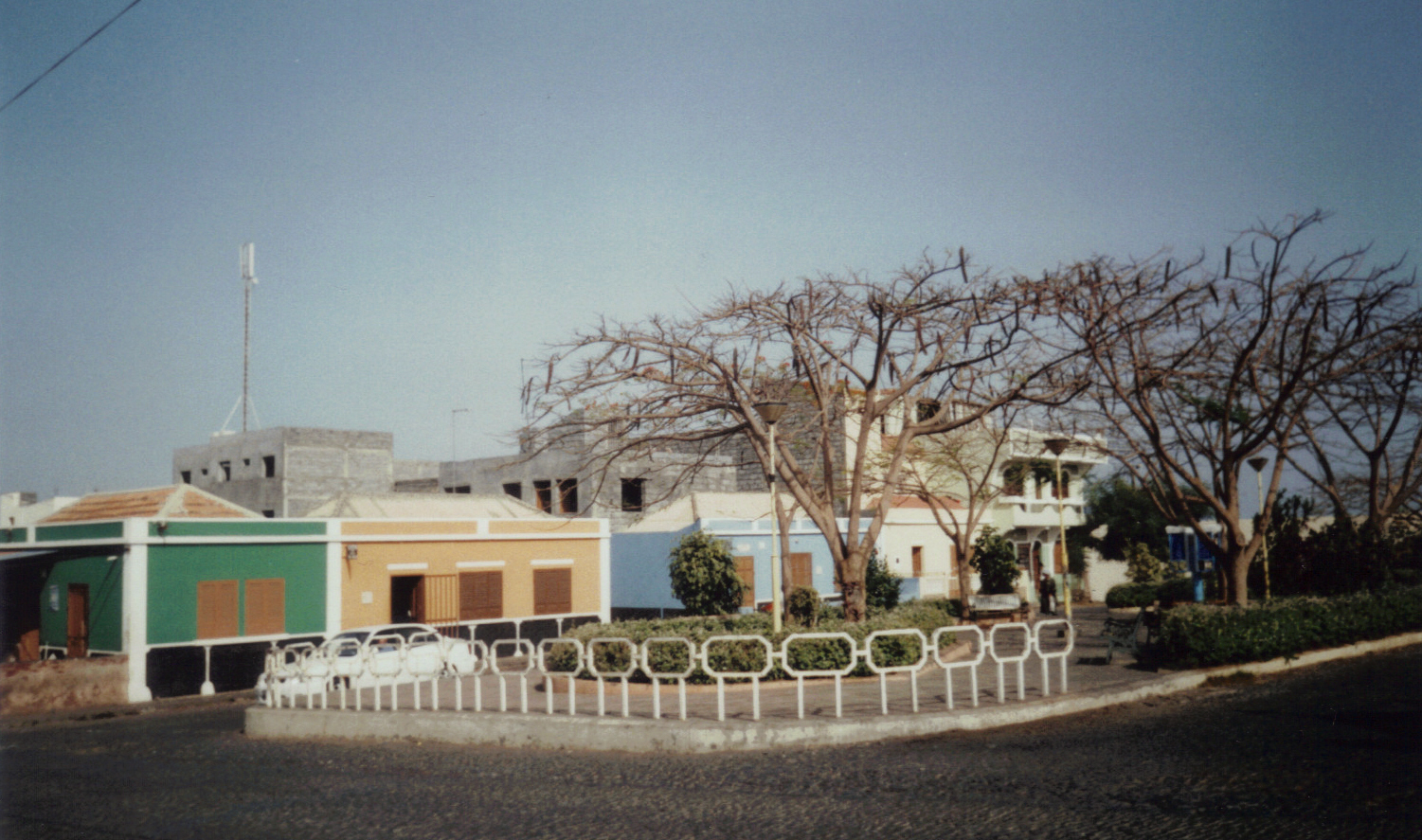
Praça Alberto da Silva.

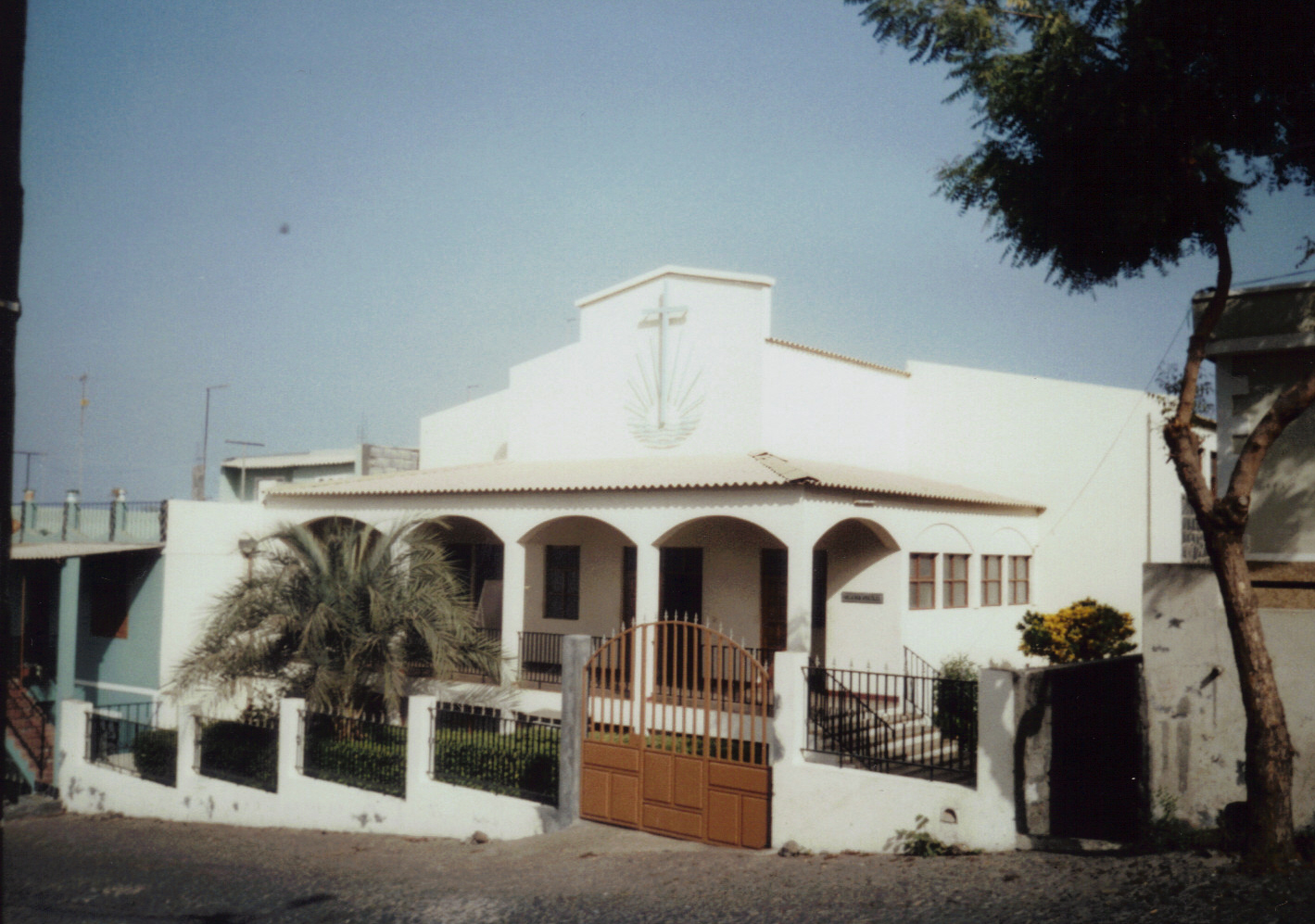
New Apostolic Church.
