= Fogo, Cape Verde =

Island of Cape Verde

Fogo
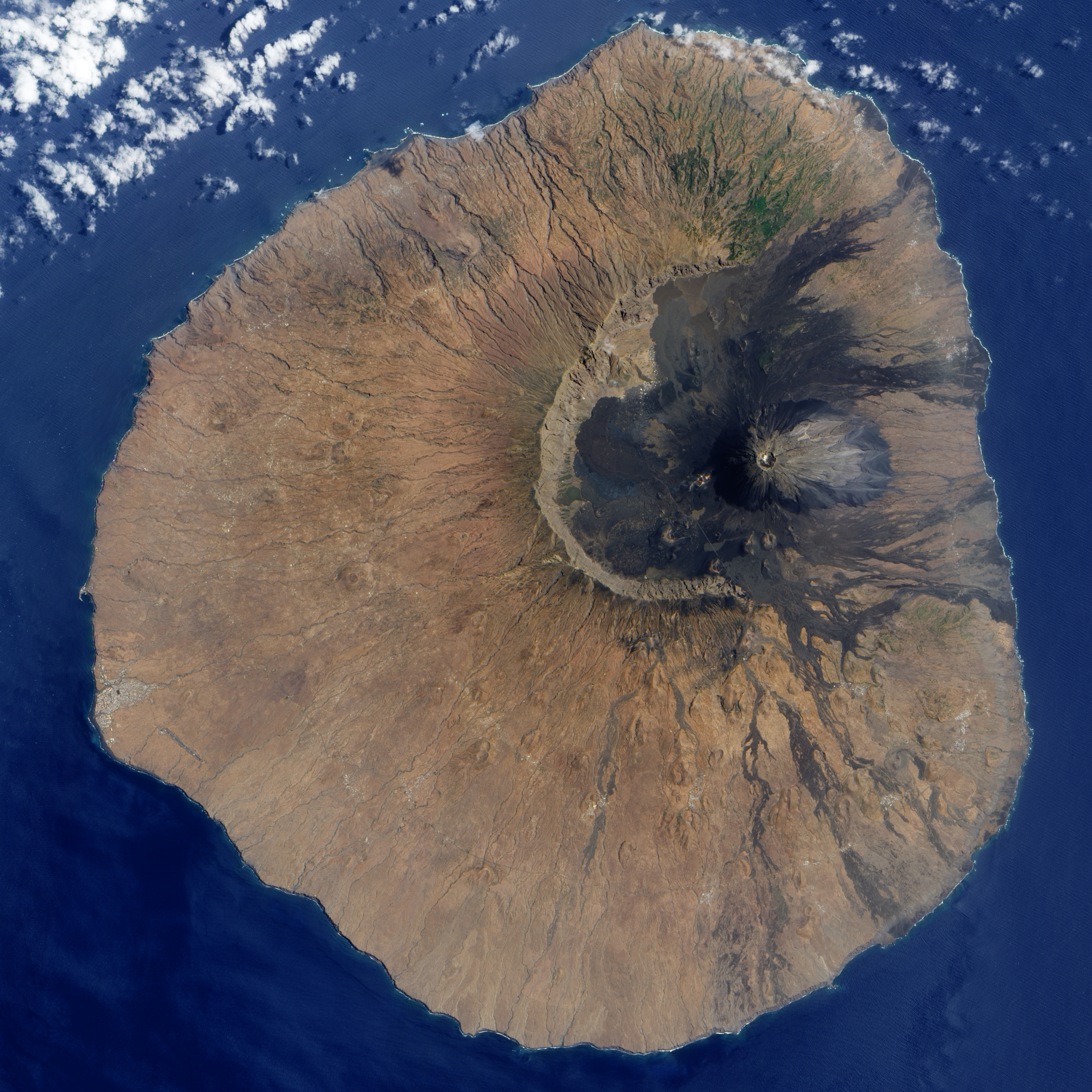
- Natural colour satellite image of Fogo

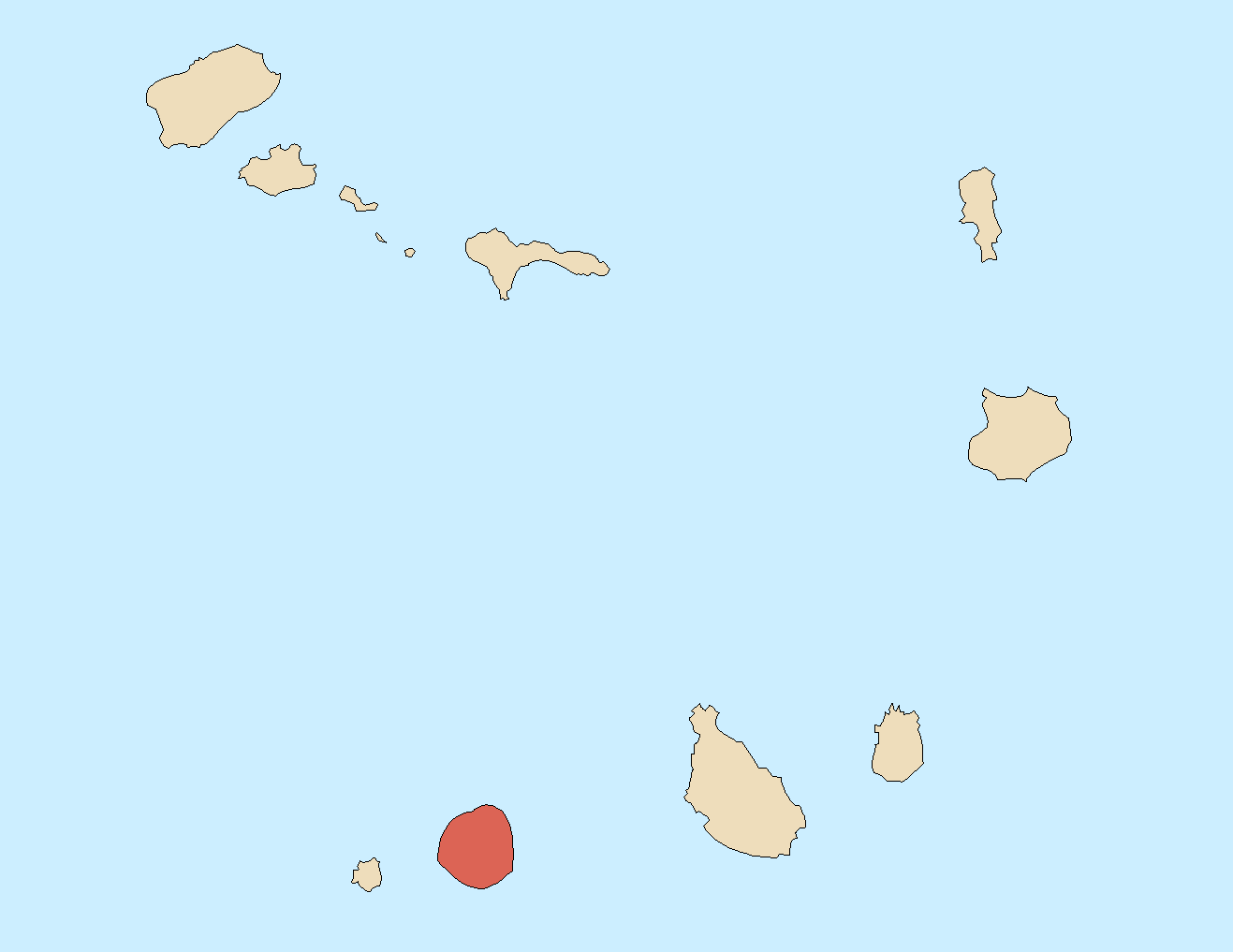

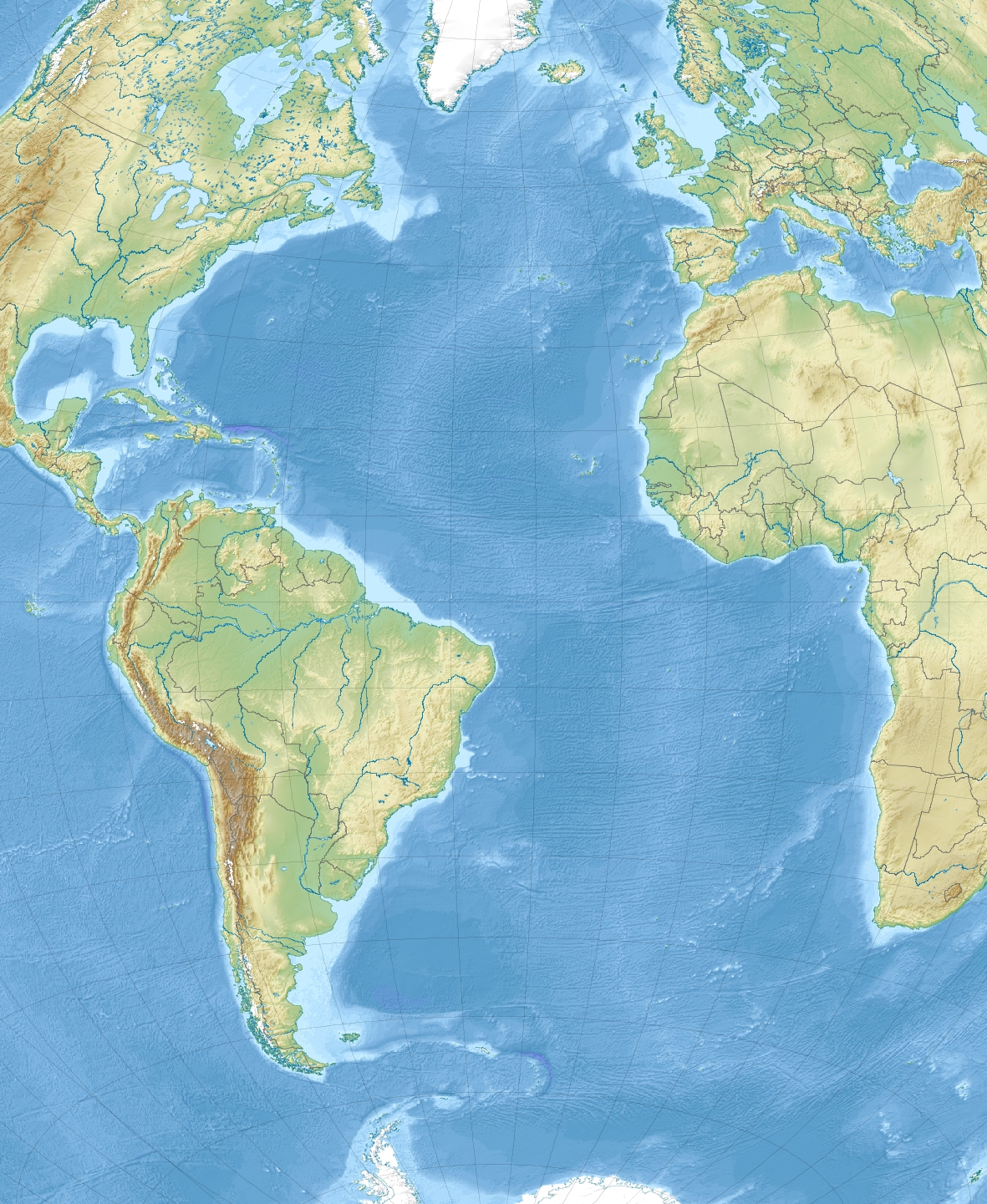
- Location within Cape Verde Location within Atlantic Ocean

Geography
- Location: Atlantic Ocean
- Coordinates: 14.9500°N 24.3425°W
- Area: 476 km^{2} (184 sq mi)
- Length: 26.3 km (16.34 mi)
- Width: 23.9 km (14.85 mi)
- Highest elevation: 2,829 m (9281 ft)
- Highest point: Pico do Fogo

Administration
- Cape Verde
- Concelhos (Municipalities): Mosteiros, Santa Catarina do Fogo, São Filipe
- Largest settlement: São Filipe (pop. Sao Filipe)

Demographics
- Population: 35,837 (2015)
- Pop. density: 75.3/km^{2} (195/sq mi)

Fogo (Portuguese pronunciation: [ˈfoɡu]; Portuguese for "fire") is an island in the Sotavento group of Cape Verde in the central Atlantic Ocean. Its population is 35,837 (2015), with an area of 476 km^{2} (184 sq mi). It reaches the highest altitude of all the islands in Cape Verde, rising to 2,829 metres (9,281 feet) above sea level at the summit of its active volcano, Pico do Fogo.

== History ==
The eastern side of Fogo collapsed into the ocean 73,000 years ago, creating a tsunami 170 meters (560 ft) high that struck the nearby island of Santiago.

Fogo was discovered in 1460 by Genovese captain António de Noli on behalf of Henry the Navigator and the Portuguese Crown. It appeared in a 1598 map as I. de Fogo. Fogo was the second island of Cape Verde that was settled by the Portuguese, between 1470 and 1490, making São Filipe the second oldest town of Cape Verde after Cidade Velha.

The Fogo volcano erupted frequently, both from the summit and from flank fissures, notably in 1680, 1725, 1857, 1951, 1995, and 2014–15. The eruption of 1680 covered much of the island in ash, which forced many inhabitants to flee to the nearby island of Brava.

Fogo has been very susceptible to drought and famine. In years with insufficient summer rains, many inhabitants experienced starvation. This occurred several times in the 18th and 19th century, and also between 1941 and 1943, when 31% of the island population perished.

Until January 1992 the island was one single municipality, subdivided into four parishes. The southwestern three parishes joined the new municipality of São Filipe and the northeastern parish Nossa Senhora da Ajuda became the municipality of Mosteiros. The parish of Santa Catarina do Fogo was separated from São Filipe in 2005, and became the Municipality of Santa Catarina do Fogo.

On 5 September 2026, a bus carrying school students crashed into a ravine, killing at least 25.

== Geography ==
One of the southernmost islands in Cape Verde, Fogo is located between the islands of Santiago to the east and Brava to the west. It is 26.3 km long and 23.9 km wide; its area is 476 km^{2}. Practically the whole island is a stratovolcano that has been periodically active: it last erupted in 2014. The largest volcanic feature is Bordeira, a nine-kilometre-wide (5.6 mi) caldera, which has walls one kilometre (0.62 miles) high, and has a breach in its eastern rim. Two small villages, Portela and Bangaeira, exist in the floor of the caldera (Chã das Caldeiras); the residents were evacuated during eruptions.

The island's main city is São Filipe, near which are an airport and a port. Fogo is largely an agricultural, fertile island. The north-eastern part receives the most precipitation.

=== Flora and fauna ===
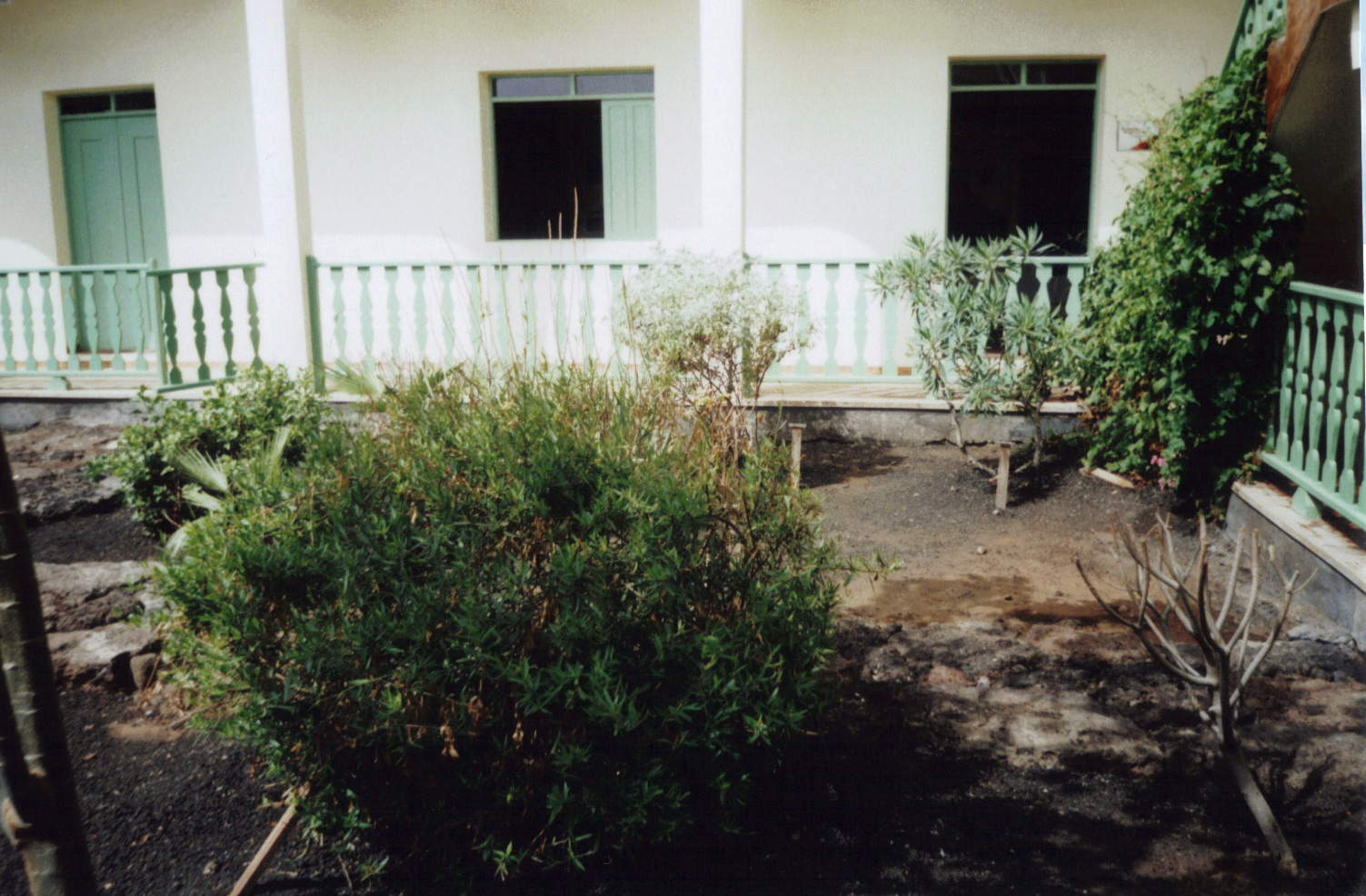
Endemic plants in the garden of the Museu Municipal in São Filipe

Key bird species of Fogo are Fea's petrel, Boyd's shearwater and Cape Verde swift. The endemic plants Echium vulcanorum (endangered) and Erysimum caboverdeanum (critically endangered) are only found on the outer crater rim of the volcano of Fogo.

=== Climate ===
Being very mountainous, Fogo has quite a number of climates. Along the coast Fogo has a moderate dry tropical climate according to the Köppen–Geiger climate classification system; higher on the slopes (~ 800 metres or 2,600 feet A.S.L.) it has a semiarid mild tropical climate (Köppen–Geiger BSh with very balanced temperatures year round; above 1,000 metres (3,300 feet) it has a cool highland subtropical steppe climate (Köppen–Geiger BSkL). The average annual temperature on the coast is about 23–25 °C (73–77 °F), decreasing to some 12–14 °C (54–57 °F) on the highest ground.

There can be remarkably cool weather in the interior, with the warmer wet season starting in July and ending in November, with the colder dry season starting in December and ending in May. Drought, the major climate risk of Cape Verdean islands, is much less pronounced on Fogo, due to the mountain's ability to gain moisture from clouds. During the mid-nineteenth century, Fogo suffered from severe droughts. Death from starvation was common in the 1830s.

Climate data for São Filipe, southwestern Fogo, 113 metres (371 feet) ASL
Month	Jan	Feb	Mar	Apr	May	Jun	Jul	Aug	Sep	Oct	Nov	Dec	Year
Mean daily maximum °C (°F)	25.6 (78.1)	25.6 (78.1)	26.2 (79.2)	26.7 (80.1)	27.1 (80.8)	27.8 (82.0)	28.4 (83.1)	28.7 (83.7)	29.1 (84.4)	29.0 (84.2)	28.6 (83.5)	26.4 (79.5)	27.4 (81.3)
Daily mean °C (°F)	22.3 (72.1)	22.1 (71.8)	22.6 (72.7)	23.0 (73.4)	23.7 (74.7)	24.3 (75.7)	25.1 (77.2)	25.7 (78.3)	26.2 (79.2)	26.3 (79.3)	25.2 (77.4)	23.5 (74.3)	24.2 (75.6)
Mean daily minimum °C (°F)	19.1 (66.4)	18.7 (65.7)	19.0 (66.2)	19.4 (66.9)	20.3 (68.5)	20.8 (69.4)	21.8 (71.2)	22.8 (73.0)	23.3 (73.9)	23.7 (74.7)	21.9 (71.4)	20.6 (69.1)	21.0 (69.8)
Average rainfall mm (inches)	3 (0.1)	2 (0.1)	0 (0)	0 (0)	0 (0)	0 (0)	14 (0.6)	81 (3.2)	121 (4.8)	35 (1.4)	11 (0.4)	5 (0.2)	272 (10.8)
Source: Climate-Data.ORG

Climate data for Chã das Caldeiras, central Fogo, 1,764 metres (5,787 feet) ASL
Month	Jan	Feb	Mar	Apr	May	Jun	Jul	Aug	Sep	Oct	Nov	Dec	Year
Mean daily maximum °C (°F)	14.8 (58.6)	14.9 (58.8)	15.4 (59.7)	15.9 (60.6)	16.4 (61.5)	17.1 (62.8)	17.7 (63.9)	18.3 (64.9)	18.9 (66.0)	18.4 (65.1)	17.4 (63.3)	15.4 (59.7)	16.7 (62.1)
Daily mean °C (°F)	11.7 (53.1)	11.5 (52.7)	11.8 (53.2)	12.3 (54.1)	13.1 (55.6)	13.7 (56.7)	14.5 (58.1)	15.2 (59.4)	15.6 (60.1)	15.5 (59.9)	14.2 (57.6)	12.7 (54.9)	13.5 (56.3)
Mean daily minimum °C (°F)	8.7 (47.7)	8.2 (46.8)	8.3 (46.9)	8.8 (47.8)	9.8 (49.6)	10.4 (50.7)	11.3 (52.3)	12.2 (54.0)	12.3 (54.1)	12.6 (54.7)	11.1 (52.0)	10.1 (50.2)	10.3 (50.5)
Average rainfall mm (inches)	11 (0.4)	6 (0.2)	3 (0.1)	0 (0)	0 (0)	2 (0.1)	49 (1.9)	151 (5.9)	198 (7.8)	67 (2.6)	25 (1.0)	12 (0.5)	524 (20.5)
Source: Climate-Data.ORG

== Population ==
In the 1830s, Fogo had an estimated human population of 10,000. In 2015, Fogo had 35,837 inhabitants, making it the fourth most populous island in the Cape Verde archipelago after Santiago, São Vicente and Santo Antão. Since 2015, there are three cities (São Filipe, Mosteiros and Cova Figueira) and two towns (Ponta Verde and Patim) in the island.

Population of Fogo, Cape Verde (1940–2015)
1940	1950	1960	1970	1980	1990	2000	2010	2015
23,022	17,582	25,615	29,412	30,978	33,902	37,409	37,071	35,837

The official language of Fogo is Portuguese; yet mostly Fogo Creole is spoken.

== Economy ==
The economy of the island is based on agriculture and fishing, with coffee and wine among the main products. In the 1830s, Fogo's wine was described as being "very superior." Due to its volcanic soil Fogo's coffee also has a good reputation. The island has experienced a substantial diaspora. Many households live off remittances from emigrants in the U.S. and in European countries (Portugal, France, the Netherlands, Italy). Fogo fosters strong connections to Rhode Island and to Massachusetts (U.S.), where many people with Cape Verdean origin live.

Tourism is steadily becoming popular. The volcano (allowed only accompanied by a local guide) is the island's major attraction but many visitors also come to see relatives. The historic city of São Filipe and Chã das Caldeiras in the volcanic crater receive the bulk of visitors. No great tourism facilities exist, but there are small hotels and bed-and-breakfasts and local guides offer hiking tours.

== Administrative divisions ==
The island is divided in three municipalities, which are subdivided into civil parishes:

- Mosteiros
  - Nossa Senhora da Ajuda
- Santa Catarina do Fogo
  - Santa Catarina do Fogo
- São Filipe
  - Nossa Senhora da Conceição
  - São Lourenço

== Transportation ==
The island has a domestic airport, São Filipe Airport, located in the southwest of the island. There is a port at Vale de Cavaleiros near São Filipe, with ferry connections to the islands of Brava (Furna) and Santiago (Praia). There are two first class national roads on Fogo: the Fogo Circular Road (EN1-FG01) and the road linking São Filipe and the island's port (EN1-FG02).

== Sports ==
The main football teams are Académica do Fogo, Botafogo, Cutelinho, Spartak d'Aguadinha and Vulcânicos.

== Notable people ==
- Pedro Cardoso, poet
- Zé Luís, footballer
- Pedro Pires, first Prime Minister and 3rd President of Cape Verde
- Henrique Teixeira de Sousa, writer
- Carlos de Vasconcelos, politician and journalist

== Gallery ==
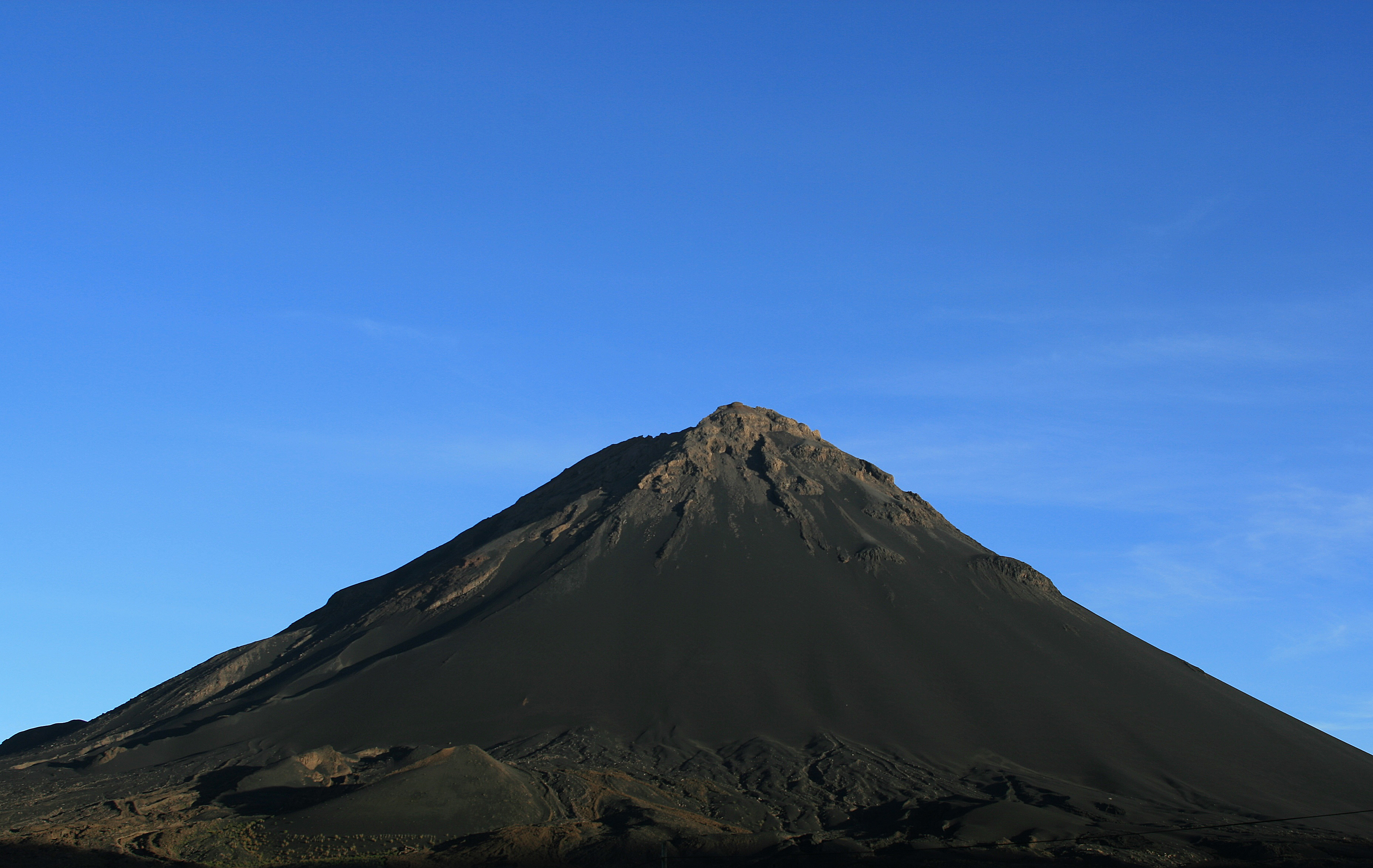
Main ash cone of Pico do Fogo

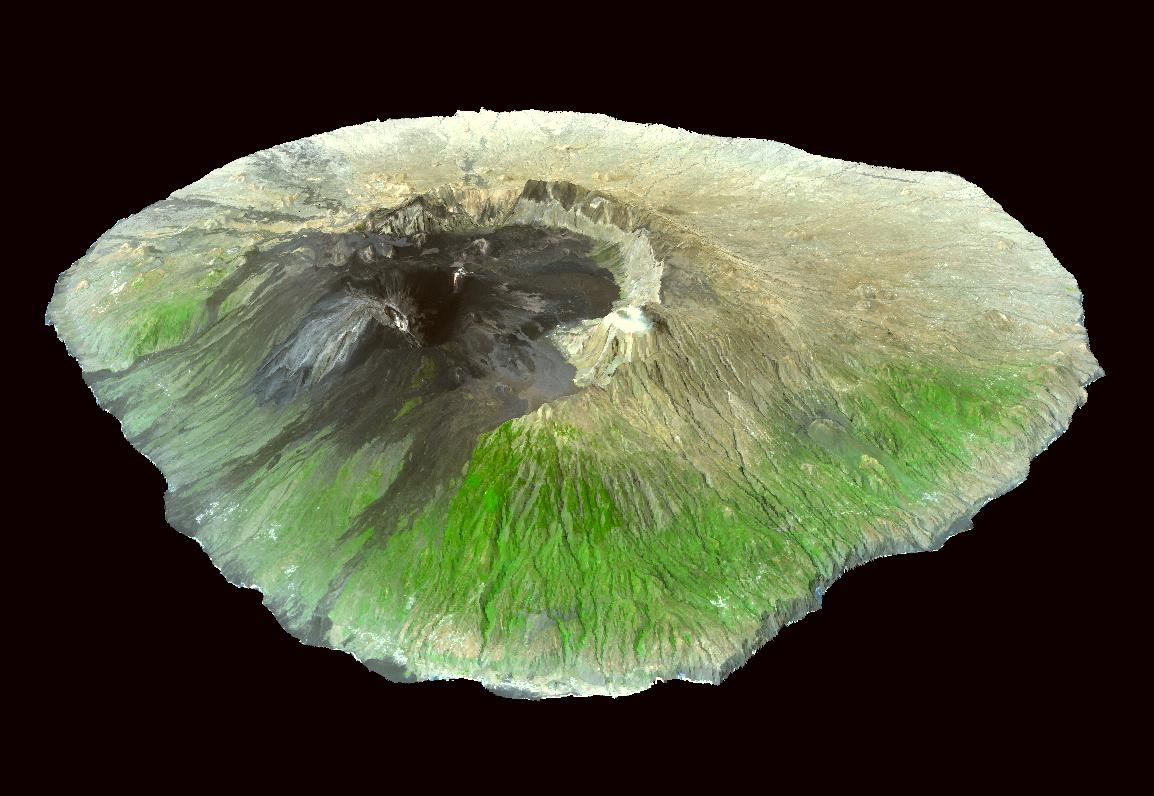
3D image of the island of Fogo from NNE

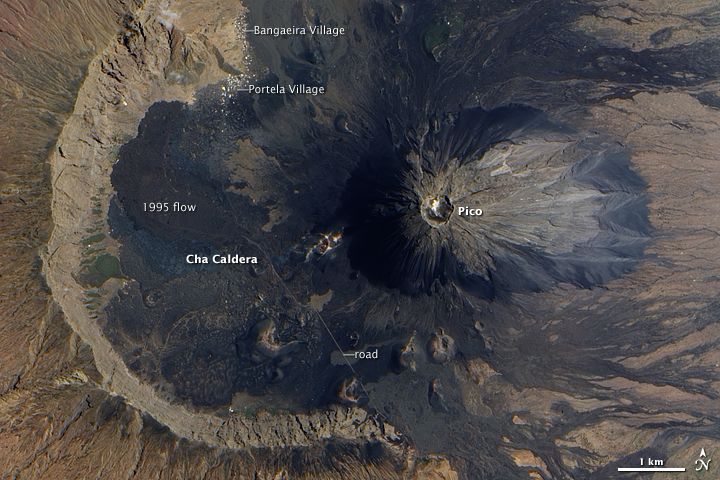
Chã das Caldeiras and main ash cone, Fogo. NASA satellite image, 2009

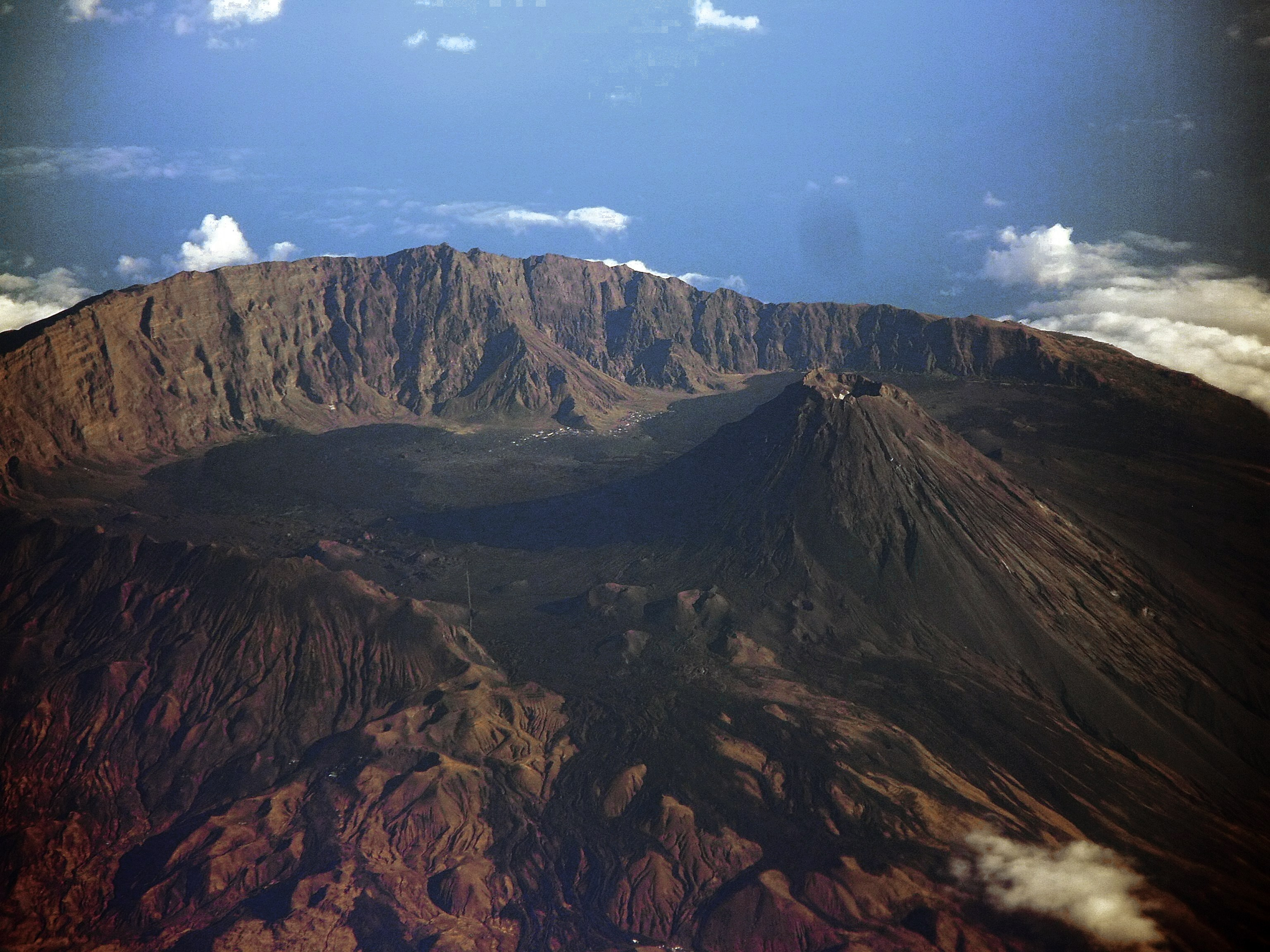
Aerial shot

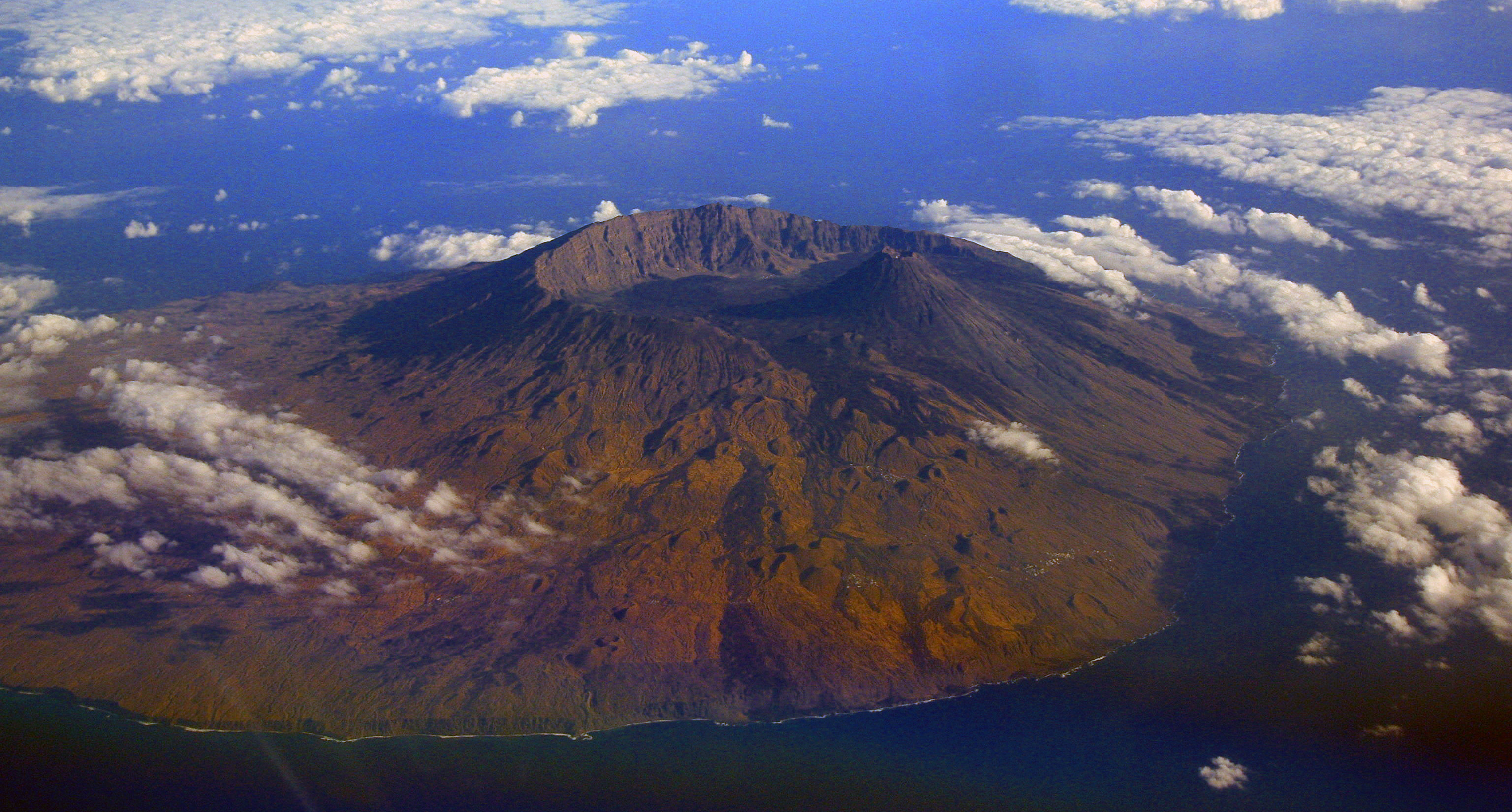
Aerial shot

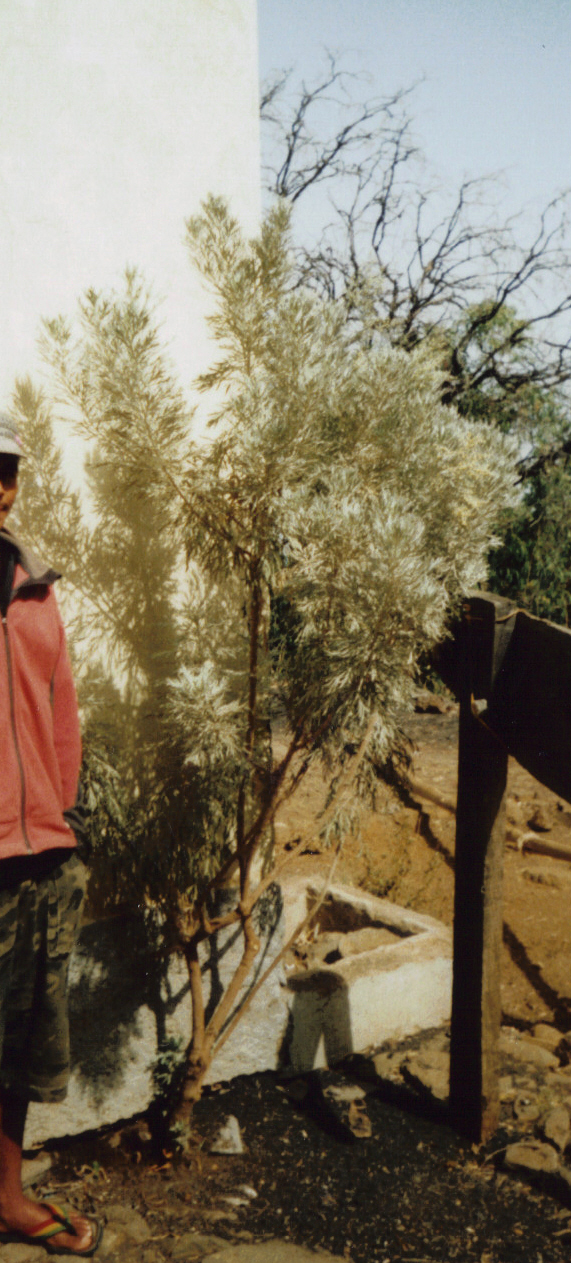
Losma, an endemic medicinal plant
