= São Filipe, Cape Verde (municipality) =

Municipality of Cape Verde

São Filipe
- Municipality
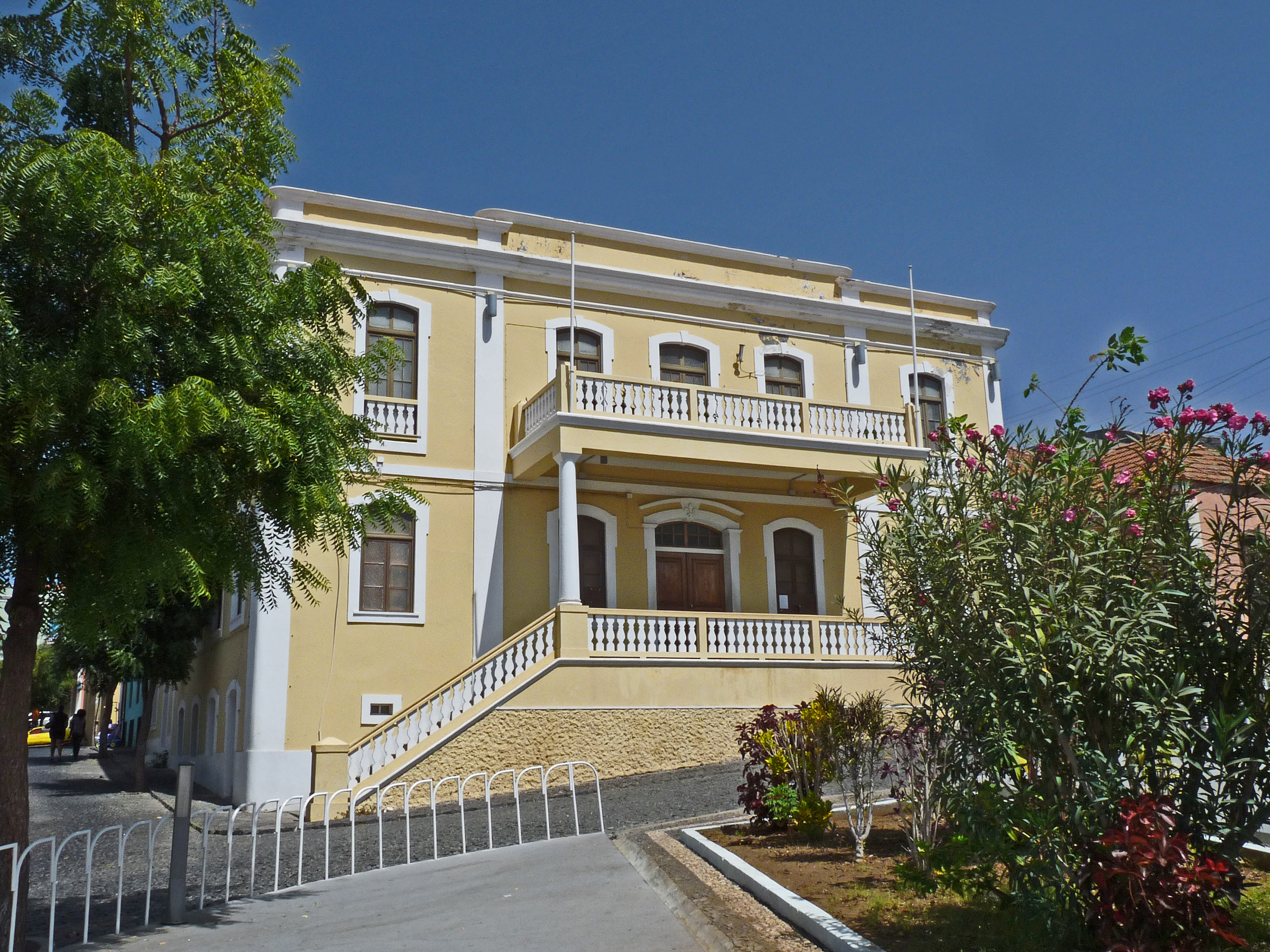
- City hall of São Filipe

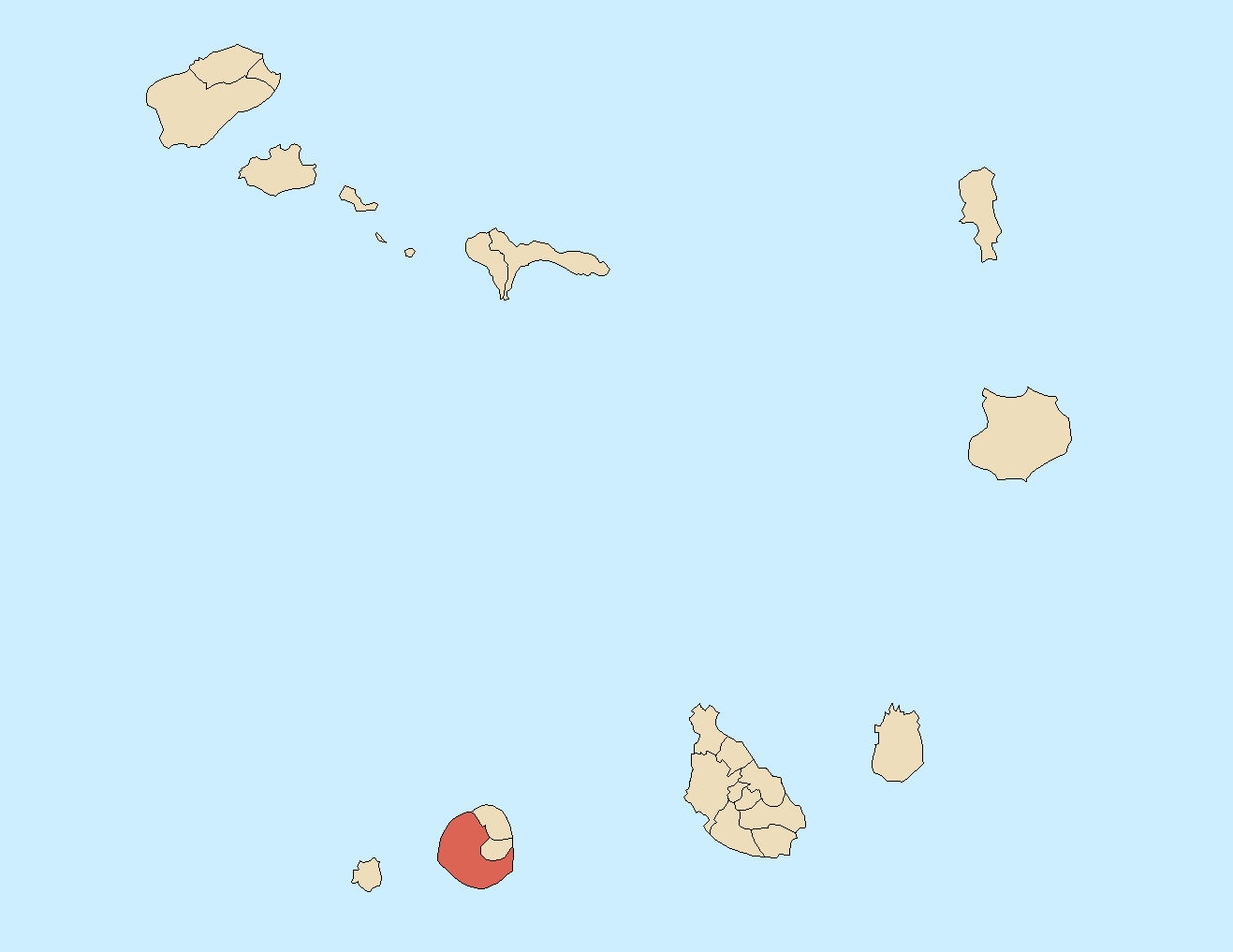
- Coordinates: 14.93°N 24.43°W
- Country: Cape Verde
- Island: Fogo

Area
  - Total: 228.84 km^{2} (88.36 sq mi)

Population (2010)
  - Total: 22,248
  - Density: 97.221/km^{2} (251.80/sq mi)
- ID: 82
- Website: http://www.cmsf.cv/

São Filipe is a concelho (municipality) of Cape Verde. Situated in the western part of the island of Fogo, it covers 49% of the island area (228.84 km^{2}), and is home to 60% of its population (22,248 at the 2010 census). Its seat is the city São Filipe. Agriculture is the main employment of the municipality, followed by tourism.

== Subdivisions ==
The municipality consists of two freguesias (civil parishes):

- São Lourenço
- Nossa Senhora da Conceição

== History ==
It was created in 1991, when the older Municipality of Fogo was split in two, the southwestern part becoming the Municipality of São Filipe and the northeastern part becoming the Municipality of Mosteiros. In 2005, an eastern parish of the municipality was split off to become the Municipality of Santa Catarina do Fogo.

== Demography ==
Population of São Filipe (1980—2010)
Year	Population
1980	19,851
1990	25,571
2000	27,886
2010	22,248

== Presidents ==
- Eugênio Miranda da Veiga - MpD (until 2008)
- Luís Pires - PAICV (as of early 2016)

== Politics ==
Since 2016, the Movement for Democracy (MpD) is the ruling party of the municipality. The results of the latest elections, in 2016:

Party	Municipal Council		Municipal Assembly	
Party	Votes%	Seats	Votes%	Seats
MpD	48.84	4	48.70	9
PAICV	28.57	2	28.12	5
GPAIS	20.98	1	21.36	3

== Sports ==
The city has the stadium, it has the Estadio 5 de Julho which is used for football (soccer), a multisport complex named Simão Mendes and a pavilion named Luzia Nunes located in another settlement close to Patim. Sports clubs in the municipality include Académica do Fogo, Botafogo, Spartak d'Aguadinha, União, Valência and Vulcânicos.

Each year, the São Filipe Municipal Cup, a football (soccer) competition takes place each year in the months of September or October. It features clubs from the municipality. The 2016 edition featured two clubs from outside the municipality.

== Twin towns ==
São Filipe is twinned with 10 Portuguese towns:

- (Portugal) Cinfães
- (Portugal) Espinho
- (Portugal) Leiria
- (Portugal) Matosinhos
- (Portugal) Moimenta da Beira
- (Portugal) Montijo
- (Portugal) Ourém
- (Portugal) Palmela
- (Portugal) Sesimbra
- (Portugal) Viseu
