= CVsky =

State-owned domestic airline of Cape Verde

- CVsky's ATR 72-600 D4-CCM at Praia International Airport
| IATA | ICAO | Call sign |
|---|---|---|
| 7B | — | — |
- Founded: 3 September 2024; 2 years ago
- Commenced operations: 29 March 2026; 7 months ago
- Hubs: Nelson Mandela International Airport
- Focus cities: Sal
- Fleet size: 3
- Destinations: 7
- Parent company: Government of Cape Verde
- Headquarters: Praia, Cape Verde
- Website: www.cvsky.cv

Linhas Aéreas de Cabo Verde, S.A. (LACV), trading as CVsky, is the state-owned domestic airline of Cape Verde (Cabo Verde). Headquartered in Praia, it operates scheduled inter-island passenger services with ATR 72-600 turboprop aircraft from a base at Nelson Mandela International Airport. The company was created by government decree in 2024 to take over the archipelago's inter-island flying from the flag carrier Cabo Verde Airlines, allowing the latter to concentrate on international routes. CVsky received its air operator certificate on 24 December 2025 and began commercial operations on 29 March 2026.

== History ==
=== Background and establishment ===
Inter-island air services in Cape Verde had historically been operated by the national flag carrier, which as TACV and later Cabo Verde Airlines also flew international routes. In 2025 the airline's inter-island operations were affected by fleet limitations and incidents involving its older aircraft, and it introduced two ATR aircraft on domestic routes from 2 October 2025 and leased a third from Royal Air Maroc.

The decree creating Linhas Aéreas de Cabo Verde was approved by the Council of Ministers on 23 July 2024 and promulgated by the President of the Republic on 3 September 2024. The company was incorporated as a public limited company (sociedade anónima) with exclusively public capital, with the State of Cape Verde as its sole shareholder, and was given responsibility for domestic passenger and cargo services under public service obligations.

The Cape Verdean government arranged sovereign guarantees to support the lease of two ATR 72-600 aircraft for inter-island service. The first ATR 72-600 was delivered to Cabo Verde Airlines in September 2025 on an eight-year lease; the aircraft were initially operated by Cabo Verde Airlines on inter-island routes pending certification of the new company, after which they were to be transferred to LACV.

=== Certification and launch ===
The Civil Aviation Agency (Agência de Aviação Civil, AAC) granted LACV an air operator certificate (AOC) and an operating licence on 24 December 2025, authorising it to operate domestic services under the CVsky brand. The airline's brand identity was presented at the Technology Park in Praia at a ceremony chaired by Prime Minister Ulisses Correia e Silva.

Ticket sales for domestic routes opened on 26 February 2026, ahead of the IATA Summer 2026 season. Commercial operations began on 29 March 2026 with an inaugural flight from Praia to Sal. In July 2026 the airline opened bookings for its winter programme covering 25 October 2026 to 27 March 2027.

=== Developments since launch ===
On 2 September 2026, the airline technology provider Hitit announced that CVsky had gone live on its end-to-end airline platform.

In October 2026 the aircraft lessor Avation announced a lease of one new ATR 72-600 to CVsky, backed by a sovereign guarantee from the government of Cape Verde. The aircraft was delivered from ATR's facility in Toulouse on 7 October 2026, marking Avation's entry into the African market. The airline has indicated that it plans to expand its fleet to four aircraft.

== Destinations ==
As of November 2026, CVsky serves the following airports in Cape Verde.

| Island | City / Airport | IATA | Notes |
|---|---|---|---|
| Santiago | Praia – Nelson Mandela International Airport | RAI | Hub |
| Sal | Espargos – Amílcar Cabral International Airport | SID | |
| São Vicente | Mindelo – Cesária Évora Airport | VXE | |
| Boa Vista | Sal Rei – Aristides Pereira International Airport | BVC | |
| São Nicolau | Preguiça – São Nicolau Airport | SNE | |
| Maio | Vila do Maio – Maio Airport | MMO | |
| Fogo | São Filipe – São Filipe Airport | SFL | |

== Fleet ==
As of November 2026, the CVsky fleet consists of the following aircraft:

CVsky fleet
| Aircraft | In service | Orders | Passengers | Notes |
| Aircraft | In service | Orders | Economy | Notes |
|---|---|---|---|---|
| ATR 72-600 | 3 | 1 | 74 | Registrations include D4-CCM, D4-CCN and D4-CCP; one aircraft leased from Avation. |
| Total | 3 | 1 | | |

== Corporate affairs ==
CVsky is a public limited company whose sole shareholder is the State of Cape Verde. Its registered address is in the Technology Park (Parque Tecnológico) in Praia. The airline's stated mission is to provide regular, punctual and continuous inter-island air service within the scope of public service obligations, for both passengers and cargo.

== See also ==
- Cabo Verde Airlines
- TACV
- Transport in Cape Verde
- List of airlines of Cape Verde
