= Achada Grande, Mosteiros =

Achada Grande
- Settlement
- Coordinates: 14.987°N 24.305°W
- Country: Cape Verde
- Island: Fogo
- Municipality: Mosteiros
- Civil parish: Nossa Senhora da Ajuda

Population (2010)
  - Total: 538
- ID: 81101

Achada Grande (Portuguese pronunciation: [ɐˈʃaðɐ ˈɣɾɐ̃dɨ]) is a settlement in the northeastern part of the island of Fogo, Cape Verde. It is situated near the coast, 6 km southeast of Mosteiros. Its population was 538 in 2010. Nearby settlements include Corvo to the north and Relva to the southeast.

== See also ==
- List of villages and settlements in Cape Verde
