= Feijoal =

Feijoal may refer to:

- Feijoal, Amazonas, a village in the state of Amazonas, Brazil
- Feijoal, Fogo, a village on the island Fogo, Cape Verde
