= List of airlines of Cape Verde =

This is a list of airlines currently operating in Cape Verde:

Airline	IATA	ICAO	Callsign	Image
Cabo Verde Airlines	VR	TCV	CABOVERDE	
CVsky	7B	KGF	TCV001	
Cabo Verde Express		CVE	KABEX	

== See also ==
- List of airlines
- List of defunct airlines of Cape Verde
- List of airports in Cape Verde
