= List of shipwrecks in September 1872 =

The list of shipwrecks in September 1872 includes ships sunk, foundered, grounded, or otherwise lost during September 1872.

== 1 September ==
List of shipwrecks: 1 September 1872
Ship	State	Description
Argo	France	The ship was wrecked in Trinity Bay with the loss of eight of her nineteen crew. She was on a voyage from Toulon, Var to Montreal, Quebec, Canada.
Gladan	Sweden	The ship was sighted off Spitsbergen, Norway. Presumed subsequently wrecked in ice.
Polhem	Sweden	The ship was sighted off Spitsbergen. Presumed subsequently wrecked in ice.

== 2 September ==
List of shipwrecks: 2 September 1872
Ship	State	Description
Berbice	United Kingdom	The full-rigged ship was abandoned in the Atlantic Ocean in a waterlogged condition. Her crew were rescued by the barque Robert Wendt (Germany). Berbice was on a voyage from Quebec City, Canada to Swansea, Glamorgan.
Calhoun	United States	The ship was abandoned near the Grand Banks of Newfoundland. Her crew were rescued by the steamship Vandalia (Germany). Calhoun was on a voyage from the Bull River to the Isles of Scilly, United Kingdom.
Julia	United Kingdom	The ship departed from New York, United States for Liverpool, Lancashire. No further trace, presumed foundered with the loss of all hands.

== 3 September ==
List of shipwrecks: 3 September 1872
Ship	State	Description
Coila	United Kingdom	The steamship was driven ashore at Kobe, Japan.
Edith Emily	United Kingdom	The ship was driven ashore at "Pointe des Monts". She was on a voyage from Liverpool, Lancashire to Montreal, Quebec, Canada.
Festina Leute	United Kingdom	The ship departed from London for Trinidad. No further trace, presumed foundered with the loss of all hands.
Robert Burns	United Kingdom	The paddle tug ran aground off Proti Island, Greece. She was on a voyage from "Princes Island" to Constantinople, Ottoman Empire. She was refloated but consequently sank in Beyenkdereh Bay.

== 4 September ==
List of shipwrecks: 4 September 1872
Ship	State	Description
Elizabeth	United Kingdom	The brig was driven ashore at Harwich, Essex. She was on a voyage from Dram, Norway to Ipswich, Suffolk. She was refloated and resumed her voyage.
Mary Anthony	United Kingdom	The steamship foundered in the Bay of Biscay. Her crew were rescued by the steamship Polina (United Kingdom). Mary Anthony was on a voyage from Bône, Algeria to Sunderland, County Durham.
Prince Llewellyn	United Kingdom	The schooner was driven ashore at the Poolbeg Lighthouse, Dublin. She was on a voyage from Southampton, Hampshire to Dublin.

== 5 September ==
List of shipwrecks: 5 September 1872
Ship	State	Description
Auguste Georges	France	The barque was wrecked on "Malayong Island", Spanish East Indies. Her crew were rescued.
Brothers Success	United Kingdom	The ship was driven ashore at Brielle, South Holland, Netherlands. She was refloated.
Elizabeth Jose	United Kingdom	The sloop was abandoned in Whitesand Bay. She was towed in to Falmouth, Cornwall the next day by the tug Scotia (United Kingdom).
Newcastle	United Kingdom	The barque was wrecked on the Tuskar Rock with the loss of all but one of her 30 crew. A stowaway also died. The survivor was rescued by the steamship Castilian (United Kingdom). Newcastle was on a voyage from Liverpool, Lancashire to Savannah, Georgia, United States and/or Havana, Cuba.
Oscar	Norway	The schooner ran aground on Læsø, Denmark. She was on a voyage from Grangemouth, Stirlingshire, United Kingdom to Tønsberg. She was refloated and taken in to Fredrikshavn, Denmark in a leaky condition.

== 6 September ==
List of shipwrecks: 6 September 1872
Ship	State	Description
Bretagne	France	The ship struck a sunken rock and sank off Abrevac'h, Finistère.
Maria	Germany	The barque was wrecked on a rock west of "Luiting", China.
William	United Kingdom	The ship was driven ashore at Lindisfarne, Northumberland.

== 7 September ==
List of shipwrecks: 7 September 1872
Ship	State	Description
Sappho	United States	The yacht ran aground in the Solent 1.5 nautical miles (2.8 km) west of Ryde Pier, Isle of Wight, United Kingdom.
Wild Gazelle	United States	The ship was abandoned in the Atlantic Ocean. Her crew were rescued. She was on a voyage from Baltimore, Maryland to Paysand.

== 9 September ==
List of shipwrecks: 9 September 1872
Ship	State	Description
Alice Maud	United Kingdom	The drogher was driven ashore and wrecked in a hurricane at Martinique. Her crew were rescued.
Armand	France	The barque was lost in a hurricane at Martinique.
Chicken Hazard	United Kingdom	The schooner sank in a hurricane at Martinique.
Comete	France	The barque was driven ashore and wrecked in a hurricane at Martinique. Her crew were rescued.
Crusader	United Kingdom	The ship was abandoned in the Atlantic Ocean. Her crew were rescued by General McLellan (United States). Crusader was on a voyage from Callao, Peru to Queenstown, County Cork.
Elora	France	The barque sank in a hurricane at Martinique.
Everard	France	The steamship sank in a hurricane at Martinique.
Heinrick	Germany	The ship was wrecked on the Middelplatte, in the North Sea. Her crew were rescued. She was on a voyage from Hartlepool, County Durham, United Kingdom to "Wohrden".
Herald	United Kingdom	The ship was driven ashore and wrecked in a hurricane at Martinique. Her crew were rescued.
Islesman	Barbados	The steamship was driven ashore and wrecked in a hurricane at Martinique with the loss of three lives.
James Richardson	United Kingdom	The barque was damaged in a hurricane at Saint Kitts.
Jenny	France	The ship was driven ashore and wrecked or foundered in a hurricane at Martinique. Her crew were rescued.
Joseph	France	The barque was wrecked in a hurricane at Martinique.
Louisa	France	The sloop sank in a hurricane at Martinique.
Marie	France	The barque sank in a hurricane at Martinique.
Marsellaise	France	The barque was driven ashore and wrecked or foundered in a hurricane at Martinique. Her crew were rescued.
Rosebud	United Kingdom	The ship was damaged in a hurricane at Saint Kitts.
Roseway	United States	The brig was lost in a hurricane at Saint Kitts.
Vengeur	France	The barque sank in a hurricane at Martinique.
Voyager	France	The barque was driven ashore and wrecked or foundered in a hurricane at Martinique. Her crew were rescued.
Wilhelmine	Germany	The schooner was wrecked. Her crew were rescued.
Winifred	United Kingdom	The drogher was lost in a hurricane at Martinique. Her crew were rescued.
Winnefred	France	The barque was driven ashore and wrecked or foundered in a hurricane at Martinique. Her crew were rescued.
Unnamed	Flag unknown	The schooner was blown out to sea from Saint Kitts in a hurricane. No further trace.
Unnamed	Flag unknown	The sloop was driven ashore in a hurricane at Saint Kitts.
Unnamed	Flag unknown	The barque was driven ashore and wrecked in a hurricane at Saint Kitts.
Unnamed	China	The junk was run into by the full-rigged ship Araby Maid (United Kingdom) and sank at Woosung.

== 10 September ==
List of shipwrecks: 10 September 1872
Ship	State	Description
Beta	United Kingdom	The steamship was wrecked on the Sage Rock, off Porto, Portugal. She was on a voyage from London to Porto.
Canonan	Leeward Islands	The sloop was driven ashore in a hurricane at Martinique.
Coquette	France	The steam launch was driven ashore in a hurricane at Martinique.
Emerald	United Kingdom	The schooner was wrecked in a hurricane at Martinique.
Eloiza	Venezuela	The schooner was driven ashore in a hurricane at Martinique.
Exlinsa	Greece	The brig was driven ashore at Portimão, Portugal.
Precheur	France	The steam launch foundered in a hurricane at Martinique.
Winifred	Canada	The brigantine was severely damaged in a hurricane at Martinique.

== 11 September ==
List of shipwrecks: 11 September 1872
Ship	State	Description
Amazon	United Kingdom	The brigantine was driven ashore in a hurricane at Barbados.
Bride of Lorne	United Kingdom	The sloop was driven ashore in a hurricane at Pelican Island, Barbados.
Catherine Thompsan	United Kingdom	The ship sank at Irvine, Ayrshire.
Friend	Barbados	The ship was lost in a hurricane at Dominica.
Grace Kelly	United Kingdom	The brigantine was driven ashore in a hurricane at Barbados.
Iona	United Kingdom	The steamship ran aground in the River Thames at the entrance to Bow Creek. She was on a voyage from London to Leith, Lothian. She was refloated and resumed her voyage.
James Barker	United States	The brigantine was driven ashore in a hurricane at Barbados.
Johnson	Leeward Islands	The schooner was lost in a hurricane at Dominica.
Josephine	Leeward Islands	The schooner was lost in a hurricane at Dominica.
Lotus	Leeward Islands	The schooner was lost in a hurricane at Dominica.
Maggie	(United Kingdom of Great Britain and Ireland) Tobago	The sloop was driven ashore or foundered in a hurricane at Barbados.
Ocean Spray	United Kingdom	The barque collided with the steamship Hirondelle (France) and foundered in the North Sea off Happisburgh, Norfolk. Her crew were rescued by Hirondelle. Ocean Spray was on a voyage from South Shields, County Durham to Lisbon, Portugal.
Preciosa	United Kingdom	The ship collided with the steamship Albanian (United Kingdom) and was beached at Egremont, Lancashire. She was on a voyage from St. Ubes, Portugal to Liverpool, Lancashire. She was refloated and taken in to Liverpool.
Reindeer	Leeward Islands	The schooner was lost in a hurricane at Dominica.
Sally	United Kingdom	The ship sank at Irvine.
HM hired ship Springham	Barbados	The survey ship, a schooner, was lost in a hurricane at Dominica.
Stephen	Leeward Islands	The schooner was lost in a hurricane at Dominica.
West Stanley	United Kingdom	The steamship was driven ashore at Hope Point, County Cork. She was on a voyage from Kronstadt, Russia to Crookhaven, County Cork.

== 12 September ==
List of shipwrecks: 12 September 1872
Ship	State	Description
New House	United Kingdom	The schooner foundered off Lundy Island, Devon. Her crew were rescued by a smack.
Marion	Canada	The ship sprang a leak and was abandoned in the Atlantic Ocean. Her crew were rescued. She was on a voyage from Lockport, Newfoundland Colony to Trinidad.

== 13 September ==
List of shipwrecks: 13 September 1872
Ship	State	Description
Amity	United Kingdom	The sloop foundered off Great Orme Head, Caernarfonshire. Her crew were rescued. She was on a voyage from "Llanhawn" to Liverpool, Lancashire.
Antonio	France	The chasse-marée ran aground on the Corton Sand, in the North Sea off the coast of Suffolk, United Kingdom and sank. Her six crew were rescued. She was on a voyage from Bilbao, Spain to Middlesbrough, Yorkshire, United Kingdom.
Celuta	Norway	The barque was wrecked on "Hoff's Island". Her crew were rescued. She was on a voyage from Hull, Yorkshire to Narva, Russia.
HMS Supply	Royal Navy	The transport ship ran aground at Cape Palmas, Liberia. She was refloated and found to be severely leaky.

== 14 September ==
List of shipwrecks: 14 September 1872
Ship	State	Description
Atlas	Denmark	The barque collided with Pauline (Germany) and sank south of Dragør, Denmark. Her crew were rescued. Atlas was on a voyage from Hull, Yorkshire, United Kingdom to Härnösand, Sweden.
Caroline Louise	Russia	The ship was wrecked at Thisted, Denmark. Her crew were rescued. She was on a voyage from Hartlepool, County Durham, United Kingdom to Stockholm, Sweden.
Deploana	Norway	The yacht was driven ashore at Dragør, Denmark. She was on a voyage from Christiania to Saint Petersburg, Russia.
Hafnia	Flag unknown	The ship was run into by Helios (Flag unknown) and was abandoned. Her crew were rescued.
Luigina Bianchetti	Italy	The ship departed from Montevideo, Uruguay for Antwerp, Belgium. No further trace, presumed foundered with the loss of all hands.
Marianna	Italy	The barque was driven ashore and wrecked at The Lizard, Cornwall, United Kingdom. She was on a voyage from Bassein, India to Falmouth, Cornwall.
Nuova Raffelina	Italy	The barque was driven ashore and wrecked at The Lizard. She was on a voyage from Bassein to Falmouth.
Orray Taft	United States	The whaler, a barque was wrecked on Marble Island, Northwest Territories, Canada with the subsequent loss of some of her crew. Survivors were rescued on 2 August 1873,. probably by the whaling schooner Abbie Bradfield, which is known to have rescued the survivors of Ansel Gibbs (United States), who were also rescued from Marble Island that day.
Prosperous	United Kingdom	The ship collided with Salisbury (United Kingdom) and was beached at Copenhagen, Denmark. She was on a voyage from Riga, Russia to Hull, Yorkshire.
Shermann	United States	The ship was driven ashore on the Estonian coast. Her crew were rescued by a lifeboat.
Wycliffe	United Kingdom	The brig was wrecked off "Palm Island", Brazil. Her crew were rescued. She was on a voyage from Rio de Janeiro to Pará, Brazil.

== 15 September ==
List of shipwrecks: 15 September 1872
Ship	State	Description
Sanderson	United Kingdom	The ship was destroyed by fire off Corvo, Cape Verde Islands. Her crew were rescued by Mathilde (Germany). Sanderson was on a voyage from Algoa Bay to Sunderland, County Durham.

== 16 September ==
List of shipwrecks: 16 September 1872
Ship	State	Description
Braes of Engie	United Kingdom	The schooner was wrecked on Rømø, Denmark. She was on a voyage from Fraserburgh, Aberdeenshire to Harburg, Germany.
Robert James	United Kingdom	The brig sprang a leak and foundered in the North Sea. Her crew were rescued by the steamship Mary (United Kingdom). Robert James was on a voyage from Sunderland, County Durham to Riga, Russia.

== 17 September ==
List of shipwrecks: 17 September 1872
Ship	State	Description
Lily	United Kingdom	The ship was wrecked at Cardiff, Glamorgan. Her crew were rescued. She was on a voyage from Newport, Monmouthshire to Bideford, Devon.
Tell	New Zealand	The 302-ton barque was wrecked stranded in Northland, New Zealand, while en route from Newcastle, New South Wales and became a total wreck.
Thomas P. Davies	United Kingdom	The ship sprang a leak and was beached at Tranmere, Cheshire. She was on a voyage from Liverpool, Lancashire to Dublin.
Victoria	New Zealand	The 17-ton schooner was wrecked at the mouth of the Awanui River when she stranded on rocks.

== 19 September ==
List of shipwrecks: 19 September 1872
Ship	State	Description
Hilda	Germany	The ship sprang a leak and sank near Glückstadt.
Marthine	United Kingdom	The ship ran aground in the River Wyre. She was on a voyage from Richibucto, New Brunswick, Canada to Fleetwood, Lancashire.
Seine	France	The steamship was driven ashore on the coast of Somerset, United Kingdom. She was refloated and resumed her voyage.

== 20 September ==
List of shipwrecks: 20 September 1872
Ship	State	Description
Alida	Netherlands	The schooner was abandoned in the Atlantic Ocean. Her crew were rescued. She was on a voyage from Cartagena, Spain to Liverpool, Lancashire, United Kingdom.
Ann	United Kingdom	The ship was driven ashore east of Dunkirk, Nord, France. She had become a wreck by 24 September.
Zora	Greece	The brig foundered in the Atlantic Ocean off the mouth of the Amazon. Her crew were rescued.
Unnamed	Flag unknown	The ship was wrecked in Clarach Bay.

== 21 September ==
List of shipwrecks: 21 September 1872
Ship	State	Description
Alfred and Elizabeth	United Kingdom	The Thames barge collided with the schooner Russell (United Kingdom) and sank in the River Medway.
James	United Kingdom	The schooner ran aground on the Little Burbo Bank, in Liverpool Bay. She was on a voyage from Liverpool, Lancashire to Nantes, Loire-Inférieure, France. She was refloated and towed in to Liverpool.
Lena	United Kingdom	The steamship ran aground in the Bosphorus. She was on a voyage from London to the Danube. She was refloated and resumed her voyage.
William	United Kingdom	The brig departed from West Hartlepool, County Durham for Bremerhaven, Germany. No further trace, presumed foundered in the North Sea with the loss of all hands.

== 22 September ==
List of shipwrecks: 22 September 1872
Ship	State	Description
Firense	Italy	The steamship ran aground in the Danube 39 nautical miles (72 km) from its mouth.
National	France	The full-rigged ship ran aground on the Santiago Bank, in the River Plate. She was on a voyage from Bordeaux, Gironde to Rio de Janeiro, Brazil.
Nina	United Kingdom	The brig was abandoned at sea. Her crew were rescued by Emma D. (United States). Nina was on a voyage from Redonda, Leeward Islands to Goole, Yorkshire.
Sjofna	Denmark	The ship ran aground on the Middle Ridge, in the Bristol Channel. She was on a voyage from Appledore, Devon, United Kingdom to Helsingør.

== 23 September ==
List of shipwrecks: 23 September 1872
Ship	State	Description
Attilio	Italy	The barque was wrecked at Copacabana, Brazil. Her crew were rescued. She was on a voyage from Buenos Aires, Argentina to Belle Île, Morbihan, France.
Raisbeck	United Kingdom	The ship departed from Newcastle upon Tyne, Northumberland for Geestemünde, Germany. No further trace, presumed foundered with the loss of all hands.
Susan	United Kingdom	The ship departed from Dover, Kent for Leith, Lothian. No further trace, presumed foundered with the loss of all hands.
Twee Gebroders	Netherlands	The ship departed from Ostend, West Flanders, Belgium for Leith, Lothian, United Kingdom. No further trace, presumed foundered in the North Sea with the loss of all hands.

== 24 September ==
List of shipwrecks: 24 September 1872
Ship	State	Description
Adelaide	United Kingdom	The schooner put in to Fishguard, Pembrokeshire and sank. Her crew were rescued. She was on a voyage from Aberdovey, Cardiganshire to Cardiff, Glamorgan.
Eri-King	United Kingdom	The ship ran aground at Glasgow, Renfrewshire. She was on a voyage from Montreal, Quebec, Canada to Glasgow.
Galena	United States	Carrying a cargo of lumber, the wooden steamer ran hard aground on North Point Reef in Lake Huron off the coast of Michigan. She eventually broke up and sank. Her wreck lies in 16 feet (4.9 m) of water at 45.007667°N 83.249833°W.
Laura	United Kingdom	The schooner ran aground and sank at Hook of Holland, South Holland, Netherlands. All on board were rescued.
Lisbon	United Kingdom	The ship foundered with the loss of all hands, according to a message in a bottle that washed up at Portrush, County Antrim on 30 September.
Medora	Norway	The ship ran aground on the Rute Miplaper, in the Baltic Sea.

== 25 September ==
List of shipwrecks: 25 September 1872
Ship	State	Description
Albion	United Kingdom	The steamship sank at Havre de Grâce, Seine-Inférieure, France. She was on a voyage from Honfleur, Manche, France to Littlehampton, Sussex.
Ariel	United Kingdom	The schooner collided with the schooner Maria (United Kingdom) and was beached at Spurn Point, Yorkshire.
Eaglet	United Kingdom	The schooner was driven ashore at Sheringham, Norfolk. Her crew were rescued.
Elizabeth	Denmark	The schooner was wrecked. Her crew were rescued. She was on a voyage from Aarhus to the Firth of Forth.
George Reed	United Kingdom	The steamship was wrecked in the Maldives. Her crew were rescued. She was on a voyage from London to Saigon, French Indo-China.
Gesina Antina	Norway	The ship ran aground on the Dvale Grounds, in the Baltic Sea. She was on a voyage from Saint Petersburg, Russia to Stockton-on-Tees, County Durham, United Kingdom. She was refloated and taken in to Fredrikshavn, Denmark in a leaky condition.
Humboldt	Germany	The ship ran aground on "Oedjon Boegoe", Netherlands East Indies. She was on a voyage from Australia to Batavia, Netherlands East Indies.
Jannetje	Netherlands	The schooner was abandoned in the Skaggerak. Her crew were rescued by the barque Hoppet (Germany). Jannetje was on a voyage from South Shields, County Durham, United Kingdom to Gothenburg, Sweden.
William Wise	United Kingdom	The brig was driven ashore near Southend Pier, Essex She was on a voyage from South Shields to London.
Unnamed	Flag unknown	The schooner was driven ashore at Spurn Point.

== 26 September ==
List of shipwrecks: 26 September 1872
Ship	State	Description
Assomption	France	The sloop was wrecked on the coast of Guernsey, Channel Islands.
Attaliah	United Kingdom	The brig foundered in the North Sea off Goere, Zeeland, Netherlands. Her crew were rescued by Richard (United Kingdom). Attalia was on a voyage from London to Sunderland, County Durham.
Auguste Gache	France	The steamship foundered off Belle Île, Morbihan.
Belle	United Kingdom	The brig was driven ashore and wrecked 2 nautical miles (3.7 km) north of Fraserburgh, Aberdeenshire. Her crew were rescued by the Coastguard. She was on a voyage from Arkhangelsk, Russia to Aberdeen.
Concord	United Kingdom	The brig foundered in the North Sea 130 nautical miles (240 km) east of Spurn Point, Yorkshire. Her crew were rescued. She was on a voyage from Sutton Bridge, Lincolnshire to Lübeck, Germany.
Dalhousie	Canada	The steamship was destroyed by fire. Her crew were rescued. She was on a voyage from Montreal, Quebec to Chicago, Illinois, United States.
Economy	United Kingdom	The ship foundered in the North Sea. Her crew were rescued by the barque Clemence Marie (France).
Emma	United Kingdom	The sloop foundered in the North Sea off Lowestoft, Suffolk. All on board were rescued. She was on a voyage from Maldon, Essex to Sunderland, County Durham.
Russell	United Kingdom	The ship foundered off the Lemon and Ower Sand, in the North Sea. Her crew were rescued. She was on a voyage from South Shields, County Durham to the Nieuwe Diep.
Selicia	Belgium	The steamship ran aground at Barber's Point, in the Dardanelles.
Taurus	United Kingdom	The schooner foundered in the North Sea 50 nautical miles (93 km) off Great Yarmouth, Norfolk. Her crew were rescued by the smack Wanderer (United Kingdom), which lost a crew member effecting the rescued. Taurus was on a voyage from South Shields, County Durham to Falmouth, Cornwall.
Triton	United Kingdom	The ship was wrecked on the Western Tillen, in the North Sea off the coast of Germany. Her crew survived. She was on a voyage from Sundsvall, Sweden to Grangemouth, Stirlingshire.
Venskabet	Sweden	The ship foundered 2 nautical miles (3.7 km) off Ystad. Her crew were rescued. She was on a voyage from "Sandvig" to Dordrecht, South Holland, Netherlands.
Yokohama	United States	The barque collided with the steamship Nile (United Kingdom) in the Atlantic Ocean. She was abandoned and set afire. Yokohama was on a voyage from New York to Hong Kong.

== 27 September ==
List of shipwrecks: 27 September 1872
Ship	State	Description
Antje	Germany	The ship sank in the Ems. Her crew were rescued.
Argus	Belgium	The ship sank in the North Sea. Her crew were rescued.
Carl Linck	Germany	The ship was wrecked on the Understen Rock, off Stockholm, Sweden. Her crew were rescued. She was on a voyage from Sundsvall, Sweden to Dundee, Forfarshire, United Kingdom. She was refloated on 9 October and towed in to Stockholm.
Cereal	United Kingdom	The barque caught fire and was abandoned in the Atlantic Ocean. Her crew were rescued by John Ritson (United Kingdom). Cereal was on a voyage from Savannah, Georgia to Santos, Brazil.
Eleanor	United Kingdom	The ship was driven ashore at Mundesley, Norfolk. Her crew were rescued.
Henry	United Kingdom	The ship was sighted off Great Yarmouth, Norfolk whilst on a voyage from Southampton, Hampshire to Goole, Yorkshire. No further trace, presumed foundered with the loss of all hands.
Honor	United Kingdom	The brigantine collided with a barque and foundered in the North Sea off Flamborough Head, Yorkshire. Her crew were rescued by a fishing smack.
La Perien	France	The schooner was driven ashore on Texel, North Holland, Netherlands. Her crew were rescued. She was on a voyage from Trondheim, Norway to Nantes, Loire-Inférieure.
Rebecca	United Kingdom	The ship struck the North Bull, in the Irish Sea off the coast of County Dublin. She was on a voyage from Dublin to Cardiff, Glamorgan. She was refloated and put back to Dublin, but sank in the River Liffey.
Swan	United Kingdom	The ship was abandoned off Flamborough Head, Yorkshire. Her crew took to a boat; they were rescued the next day by Echantress (United Kingdom). Swan was on a voyage from North Shields, Northumberland to Hamburg, Germany.
Theresia	Norway	The barque was driven ashore on Texel. Her crew were rescued. She was on a voyage from Sundsvall, Sweden to Antwerp, Belgium.
Vivid	United Kingdom	The ship collided with the steamship Haardrade (Germany) and sank in the Elbe. She was on a voyage from an English port to Harburg, Germany. She had been refloated by 19 October.
W. G. Russell	United Kingdom	The ship ran aground in the River Thames at Gravesend, Kent. She was on a voyage from Akyab, Burma to London.
William Dixon	United Kingdom	The barque was driven ashore on Terschelling, Friesland, Netherlands. Her crew were rescued. She was on a voyage from Hamburg, Germany to Newcastle upon Tyne, Northumberland.
Unnamed	Flag unknown	The ship ran aground on the Chapman Sand, in the Thames Estuary.

== 28 September ==
List of shipwrecks: 28 September 1872
Ship	State	Description
Dorothea	Norway	The schooner was abandoned in the North Sea 60 nautical miles (110 km) east south east of St. Abbs Head, Berwickshire, United Kingdom with the loss of three of her crew. She was on a voyage from Dram to Grangemouth, Stirlingshire, United Kingdom.
Eliza Sherris	Portugal	The ship was wrecked at Porto Seguro, Brazil.
Enterprise	United Kingdom	The ship ran aground. She was on a voyage from "Fornea" to Grimsby, Lincolnshire. She was refloated and taken in to Copenhagen, Denmark in a leaky condition.
Florence Barclay	United Kingdom	The barque was destroyed by fire in the Indian Ocean. Her crew survived. She was on a voyage from Hull, Yorkshire to Table Bay.
Jane Bingham	United Kingdom	The steamship foundered in the Raz de Sein. Her crew were rescued. She was on a voyage from Swansea, Glamorgan to "Saint-Layavu", on the west coast of France.
Lavinia	United Kingdom	The ship was abandoned in the Dogger Bank. Her crew were rescued. She was on a voyage from Gothenburg, Sweden to Blakeney, Norfolk.
Nazarene	United Kingdom	The ship foundered in Liverpool Bay with the loss of all seventeen crew. She was on a voyage from Liverpool, Lancashire to Havana, Cuba.
Parisienne	France	The lugger sank at Padstow, Cornwall, United Kingdom. She was on a voyage from Newquay, Cornwall to Neath, Glamorgan, United Kingdom.
Viola	United Kingdom	The brig was driven ashore at Gourock, Renfrewshire.
Wilhelm	Germany	The ship foundered in the North Sea. She was on a voyage from Plymouth, Devon, United Kingdom to Stettin.
Four unnamed vessels	United States	The ships sank in Lake Erie.

== 29 September ==
List of shipwrecks: 29 September 1872
Ship	State	Description
Alfred	United Kingdom	The ship sank in Swansea Bay. She was on a voyage from Newcastle upon Tyne, Northumberland to Waterford.
Corsair	United States	Corsair in 2014. The wooden schooner sank with the loss of five lives in 182 feet (55 m) of water in Lake Huron off Harrisville, Michigan, at 44.782033°N 83.123767°W.
Detroit	United States	Carrying a cargo of lumber, the wooden paddle steamer was driven ashore on the coast of Lake Huron near Greenbush, Michigan. During salvage operations a few weeks later, one of the chains used to lift her accidentally cut her in half, causing her to sink in 10 feet (3 m) of water at 44.586183°N 83.311433°W.
Elizabeth	United Kingdom	The brig was wrecked on the Haisborough Sands, in the North Sea off the copast of Norfolk. Her seven crew were rescued by the fishing trawler Lizzie Mordue (United Kingdom).
Leif	Norway	The barque was abandoned in the Atlantic Ocean. Her crew were rescued by Mary Jones (United States). Leif was on a voyage from London, United Kingdom to Baltimore, Maryland, United States.
Nenthorn	United Kingdom	The brig collided with the steamship Constance (United Kingdom) and sank off Málaga, Spain with the loss of a crew member. Survivors were rescued by Constance. Nenthorn was on a voyage from Sunderland, County Durham to Alexandria, Egypt.
Spray	United Kingdom	The ship was abandoned in the North Sea off Lowestoft, Suffolk. Her crew were rescued by Signal (United Kingdom). Spray was on a voyage from Rye, Sussex to Hartlepool, County Durham. She came ashore at Noordwijk, South Holland, Netherlands on 4 October.

== 30 September ==
List of shipwrecks: 30 September 1872
Ship	State	Description
Annechina	Netherlands	The ship was driven ashore and wrecked on Terschelling, Friesland.
Antelope, and Zanola	France; United Kingdom	The steamships collided in the English Channel and were both beached at Dungeness, Kent, with Zanola beached nearer to New Romney. Antelope was on a voyage from Antwerp, Belgium to Havre de Grâce, Seine-Inférieure. The Zanola was reported to be on a voyage from Smyrna, Ottoman Empire to Liverpool, Lancashire. She was refloated and sailed for London.
Arianna	Malta	The brigantine foundered off Gibraltar. Her crew were rescued by Audax (United Kingdom). Arianna was on a voyage from Odesa, Russia to Falmouth, Cornwall, United Kingdom.
Bee	United Kingdom	The lugger foundered in the North Sea off Lowestoft, Suffolk. Her eight crew were rescued by the smack Dove (United Kingdom).
Bonne Romelingh	Flag unknown	The ship was driven ashore and wrecked on Sylt, Germany.
Elizabeth	United Kingdom	The ship was wrecked on the Haisborough Sands, in the North Sea off the coast of Norfolk. She was on a voyage from Sunderland, County Durham to Rotterdam, South Holland, Netherlands.
Garibaldi	United Kingdom	The ship departed from Montreal, Quebec, Canada for Queenstown, County Cork. No further trace, presumed foundered with the loss of all hands.
Gesina	Flag unknown	The ship was driven ashore and wrecked on Sylt.
Ina	United Kingdom	The tender was driven ashore at the mouth of the Brodie River. She was plundered and burnt by the local inhabitants.
Jane J. Southard	United States	The full-rigged ship caught fire at Penarth, Glamorgan, United Kingdom. She was beached and scuttled. She was on a voyage from Cardiff, Glamorgan to Callao, Peru.
Salvador	Norway	The schooner was driven ashore and wrecked at "Kandestederne". Her crew were rescued. She was on a voyage from Dysart, Fife, United Kingdom to Helsingør, Denmark.
Venskabet	Norway	The ship was driven ashore and wrecked on Sylt.

== Unknown date ==
List of shipwrecks: Unknown date in September 1872
Ship	State	Description
Arctic	Germany	The brig was wrecked at Maracaibo, Venezuela.
Augusto	Brazil	The ship was lost in the Solimões River. She was on a voyage from Pará to Iquitos, Peru.
Blanche	France	The steamship foundered in the Irish Sea off the coast of Lancashire, United Kingdom before 23 September.
Christopher	(Dominion of Newfoundland) Newfoundland Colony	The ship was abandoned in the Atlantic Ocean off Bermuda in a hurricane before 21 September. Her crew were rescued.
Dagmar	(Russian Empire) Grand Duchy of Finland	The steamship ran aground between 4 and 6 September. She was on a voyage from Helsinki to Turku.
Dunkeld	United Kingdom	The brigantine was wrecked in the Bocas before 11 September.
Elizabeth	United Kingdom	The brig was abandoned in the North Sea before 10 September.
Eliza Maria	United Kingdom	The barque collided with another vessel and sank in the Hampton Roads. She was on a voyage from Santos, Brazil to a Baltic port.
Eugenie	United Kingdom	The barque was towed in to New York, United States in a derelict condition by the steamship Dorian (United Kingdom). Eugenie had been on a voyage from Brunswick, Georgia, United States to Montevideo, Uruguay.
Excalibur	United States	The ship was driven ashore on Prince Edward Island, Canada before 6 September.
Falcon	United Kingdom	The barque was wrecked on Anegada, Virgin Islands. She was on a voyage from Halifax, Nova Scotia, Canada to Ponce, Puerto Rico.
George Esson	Canada	The barque was driven ashore in the Gut of Canso. She was refloated with assistance from the steamship Medway ( Canada).
G. Palmer	United Kingdom	The ship was driven ashore at North Cape, Prince Edward Island, Canada. She was on a voyage from Cork to Richibucto, New Brunswick, Canada.
Isa	United Kingdom	The steamship was wrecked off Socotra, Aden Governorate before 13 September. Her crew were rescued by HMS Briton (Royal Navy).
Highland Mary	United Kingdom	The ship was abandoned at sea. Her crew were rescued. She was on a voyage from Belfast, County Antrim to Quebec City, Canada.
Julia D.	United Kingdom	The brigantine was wrecked at Maracaibo.
Margaret	Netherlands	The schooner was abandoned in the North Sea before 27 September.
Mathilde	United Kingdom	The ship ran aground at the mouth of the Brass River. Her crew were rescued.
Mediterrane	France	The ship was wrecked at "Kootenow", Dahomey. Her crew were rescued.
Moldavia	United Kingdom	The steamship ran aground in the Danube at "Ghiobau Ghina", Ottoman Empire.
Nathaniel	France	The ship was driven ashore on the coast of the Grand Duchy of Finland. She was on a voyage from "Tore Forss" to Marseille, Bouches-du-Rhône. She was refloated and taken in to Luleå, Sweden.
Prompt	Canada	The ship was abandoned in the Atlantic Ocean before 5 September.
Sailor's Home	United States	The ship ran aground on the Red Island Reef, in the Saint Lawrence River. She was refloated and taken in to Quebec City.
Seriole	Canada	The ship was abandoned in the Atlantic Ocean with the loss of all but four of her crew. She was on a voyage from Nova Scotia to Demerara, British Honduras.
Thorwaldsen	Germany	The steamship was driven ashore between Stettin and Swinemünde. She was refloated and taken in to Stettin, where she arrived on 1 October.
Whycliffe	United Kingdom	The ship was wrecked off Paranaguá, Brazil before 16 September. Her crew were rescued.
Witch of the Tees	United Kingdom	The ship was driven ashore at East London, Cape Colony. She was on a voyage from London to East London.
