= Atalaia, Cape Verde =

Atalaia
- Settlement
- Coordinates: 15.031°N 24.385°W
- Country: Cape Verde
- Island: Fogo
- Municipality: Mosteiros
- Civil parish: Nossa Senhora da Ajuda

Population (2010)
  - Total: 700
- ID: 81102

Atalaia is a settlement in the northern part of the island of Fogo, Cape Verde. Its population was 700 in 2010. It is situated near the coast, 6 km west of Mosteiros and 19 km northeast of the island capital São Filipe. The municipal boundary with São Filipe is to the west. Nearby settlements area Ribeira Ilhéu to the east and Campanas Baixo to the west. The festival of Saint John (São João) is celebrated every June 24.

== See also ==
- List of villages and settlements in Cape Verde
