= Relva, Cape Verde =

Relva
- Settlement
- Coordinates: 14.975°N 24.294°W
- Country: Cape Verde
- Island: Fogo
- Municipality: Mosteiros
- Civil parish: Nossa Senhora da Ajuda

Population (2010)
  - Total: 1,184
- ID: 81110

Relva is a settlement in the eastern part of the island of Fogo, Cape Verde. It is situated near the coast, 7 km southeast of Mosteiros and 23 km northeast of the island capital São Filipe.

== See also ==
- List of villages and settlements in Cape Verde
