= Fogo Airport =

Fogo Airport may refer to:

- Fogo Aerodrome in Newfoundland, Canada
- São Filipe Airport, on the Cape Verde island of Fogo
