= Mosteiros Airport =

- IATA: MTI; ICAO: GVMT

Summary
- Airport type: Public
- Serves: Mosteiros
- Location: Cape Verde
- Elevation AMSL: 66 ft (20 m)
- Coordinates: 15°2′42.4″N 024°20′24.0″W

Map
- Location of Mosteiros Airport in Cape Verde

Runways
Direction	Length		Surface
Direction	ft	m	Surface
11/29	2,520	768	Dirt
- Source: Landings.com

Mosteiros Airport (IATA: MTI, ICAO: GVMT) was a public use airfield near Mosteiros, in the northeastern part of the island Fogo, Cape Verde. The airfield operated at least since 1957 when Aero Clube de Cabo Verde opened a new air route to MTI/GVMT, with a Dove airplane which could transport 9 passengers. The airfield was closed at the end of the 1990s. Since then, the only airfield of Fogo is São Filipe Airport. Mosteiros Airport was located at the northwestern edge of the city of Mosteiros.

== See also ==
- List of airports in Cape Verde
- List of buildings and structures in Cape Verde
