= List of defunct airlines of Cape Verde =

This is a list of defunct airlines of Cabo Verde.

Airline	Image	IATA	ICAO	Callsign	Commenced operations	Ceased operations	Notes
Binter Cabo Verde		3B	NTB		2016	2019	Renamed to TICV
Cabovimo					1996	1996	
Halcyonair		7Z	HCN	CREOLE	2005	2012	
Inter Islands Airlines		H4	IIN		2002	2009	Operated Embraer Brasilia
Smartlynx Cabo Verde			LCV	CABO CAT	2016	2016	
TACV		VR	TCV	CABOVERDE	1958	2018	Renamed to Cabo Verde Airlines
TICV		3B	NTB		2019	2021	Operated ATR 72-500

== See also ==
- List of airlines of Cape Verde
- List of airports in Cape Verde
