= Ribeira do Ilhéu =

- Settlement
- Coordinates: 15.037°N 24.374°W
- Country: Cape Verde
- Island: Fogo
- Municipality: Mosteiros
- Civil parish: Nossa Senhora da Ajuda

Population (2010)
  - Total: 848
- ID: 81111

Ribeira do Ilhéu is a settlement in the northern part of the island of Fogo, Cape Verde. It is situated 6 km west of Mosteiros and 20 km northeast of the island capital São Filipe. The nearest village is Atalaia, 1.5 km to the southwest. The village's main festival is the festival of Saint Joseph (São José) that takes place on March 19.

== See also ==
- List of villages and settlements in Cape Verde
