= Green lending =

Lending dependent on environmental criteria

Green lending refers to a lending dependent on environmental criteria for the planned use of funds. It is part of the wider sustainable investing and aims to reduce the impact on the environment of new lending activities. It includes green bonds (debt), green loans (often linked to a specific project) and sustainability-linked loans (typically tied to sustainability performance objectives).

== History ==
Starting in 2005 major US banks such as Wells Fargo (July 2005, $1bn over 5 years) and Bank of America (March 2007, $20 bn) started dedicating financing toward sustainable entrepreneurship. This usually meant financing the building of environmentally sustainable or friendly buildings or enterprises. The green lending initiative appear to have been taken by the lenders as opposed to borrowers.

In 2018 the Loan Market Association in the UK issued Green Loan Principles to ensure any green loan is used for eligible green projects. This includes stating that this must be clearly articulated in the finance documents along with the expected environmental benefits, which must be assessed, quantified, measured and reported by the borrower. The list of projects that qualify as green is based on the list that the International Capital Market Association uses to define green bonds.

== ESG ratings and green loans ==
In April 2017, Unibail-Rodamco-Westfield put in place a green loan of €650Mn with a banking syndicate led by Lloyds Banking Group as sole co-ordinator and green co-ordinator. This was the world's first 'sustainability linked loan', having a margin linked to ESG Key Performance Indicators.

URW/LBG was shortly followed by ING Group arranging a sustainability-linked loan to Philips. Both facilities coupled the interest rate of the loans to the company's sustainability performance, either by reference to an external sustainability ratings, or Key Performance Indicators agreed with the syndicate banks. By June 2018, Bloomberg News reported that ING Group had closed 15 similar deals where the bank would lower the cost of borrowing by between 5% and 10% based on the company's ESG rating provided by Sustainalytics. As shown on Environmental Finance's list of sustainability loans, several other banks have teamed with various ESG ratings agencies.

Date	Company	Amount	USD equivalent ($m)	Country	Loan type	Use of proceeds	Objective/KPI	Pricing	Duration
April 2017	Unibail Rodamco	€650m	760	France	Syndicated RCF	General corporate purpose	Individual KPIs linked to environmental performance	Meeting KPIs results in a reduction in margin paid to banks	2022
April 2017	Royal Philips	€1bn	1170	Netherlands	Syndicated RCF	General corporate purpose	Philips's sustainability performance and rating provided by Sustainalytics	If the rating goes up, the interest rate goes down—and vice versa.	2022
June 2017	Barry Callebaut	€750m	870	Switzerland	Syndicated RCF	General corporate purpose	ESG Score from Sustainalytics	If the ESG rating goes up, the interest rate goes down—and vice versa.	2022
July 2017	Gas Natural	€330m	380	Spain	Bilateral RCF	-	Sustainability improvement	Partially index-linked to the environmental, social and corporate governance impact of the company.	Over four years with the possibility of an additional year.
October 2017	Abertis	€100m	118	Spain	Bilateral RCF	-	Sustainability improvement	The loan's interest rate is benchmarked to a sustainability rating from Sustainalytics	-
October 2017	SocFin	€15m	18	Belgium	Bilateral term loan	-	Sustainability improvement	-	-
October 2017	bPost SA	€300m	354	Belgium	Syndicated RCF	-	Sustainability improvement	ESG rating in the pricing of the loan determined by Sustainalytics	-
November 2017	Wilmar	$150m	150	Singapore	Bilateral RCF	General corporate purpose	ESG Score from Sustainalytics	If the rating goes up, the interest rate goes down —and vice versa.	-
December 2017	Red Eléctrica de España	€800m	944	Spain	Syndicated loan	General corporate purpose	ESG Score from Vigeo Eiris	If the rating goes up, the interest rate goes down —and vice versa.	-
December 2017	Casino Guichard Perrachon	€50m	59	France	Bilateral loan	-	Sustainability improvement	-	-
December 2017	LafargeHolcim	Not disclosed	Not disclosed	Switzerland	Bilateral RCF	-	Sustainability Improvement	-	-
May 2017	EDF	€150m	164	France	Bilateral RCF	General corporate purpose	ESG Score from Sustainalytics	If the rating goes up, the interest rate goes down —and vice versa.	NA
February 2018	Danone	€2bn	2500	France	Syndicated credit facility	General corporate purpose	ESG score provided by Sustainalytics and Vigeo Eiris / KPI: Part of Sales linked to subsidiaries certified by B Corp	Incentive scheme linked to the two KPIs	-
February 2018	Mapfre	€1bn	1250	Spain	Syndicated credit facility	General corporate purpose	ESG Score from Vigeo Eiris	If the rating goes up, the interest rate goes down —and vice versa.	Extended its maturity period until 2023 (open to a possible extension)
March 2018	Olam	$500m	500	Singapore	Loan	General corporate purpose	Scores granted by Sustainalytics on 50 ESG linked criteria	If the targets are reached on all scores, the interest rate goes down —and vice versa.	Three years
April 2018	Adecco	€600m	738	Switzerland	Loan	General corporate purpose	ESG Score from Sustainalytics	If the ESG rating goes up, the interest rate goes down —and vice versa.	-
April 2018	Polymetal	$80m	80	Russia	Bilateral RCF	-	Sustainability improvement	If the Sustainalitics score for Polymetal improves, the interest rate for the loan will be decreased. Conversely, if the Sustainalytics score deteriorates, the interest rate will increase.	-
June 2018	CMS Energy	$1.4bn	1400	US	Syndicated RCF	-	New credit facilities allow CMS to reduce its interest rate by meeting targets related to environmental sustainability, specifically renewable energy generation	-	-
June 2018	Avangrid	$2.5bn	2500	US	Syndicated RCF	-	Sustainability indicator will be independently verified by the agency Vigeo Eiris.	Price-adjustment mechanism based on the continuous reduction of AVANGRID's emission intensity.	2023
May 2018	Generali	€2bn	2380	Italy	RCF	General corporate purpose	ESG Score	The cost is linked both to targets on green investments and to progress made on sustainability initiatives.	3 years
July 2018	Pennon	£100m	130	UK	Term loan	-	The loan requires the Pennon Group to meet ESG/Sustainability objectives and key performance indicators based on an ESG Index issued by independent ratings organisation, Sustainalytics	Pennon Group receives a reduced margin on the loan if targets are achieved	5 years
September 2019	Energa	PLN2bn	500	Poland	Loan	-	Sustainability indicator will be independently verified by the agency Vigeo Eiris.	If the ESG rating goes up, the interest rate goes down - and vice versa.	5 years
December 2019	Avation	not indicated	not indicated	Singapore	Loan	Purchase of Aircraft	Sustainability indicator has been independently verified by the agency Vigeo Eiris	Fixed	10 years

In September 2018, five banks, including BBVA, structured a revolving credit facility (RCF) for the Italian power utility A2A in a finance deal valued at 400 million euros. The syndicated loan availed itself of a margin mechanism based on two parameters: the performance of two selected KPIs (waste processing capacity and the volume of renewable energy sold in the wholesale market, emphasizing the focus of the A2A Group on the circular economy and decarbonation). The solicited ESG rating was provided annually by Standard Ethics Aei.

== See also ==
- Green economy
- Green money (disambiguation)
- Ethical banking
