= Fajãzinha, Cape Verde =

Fajãzinha
- Settlement
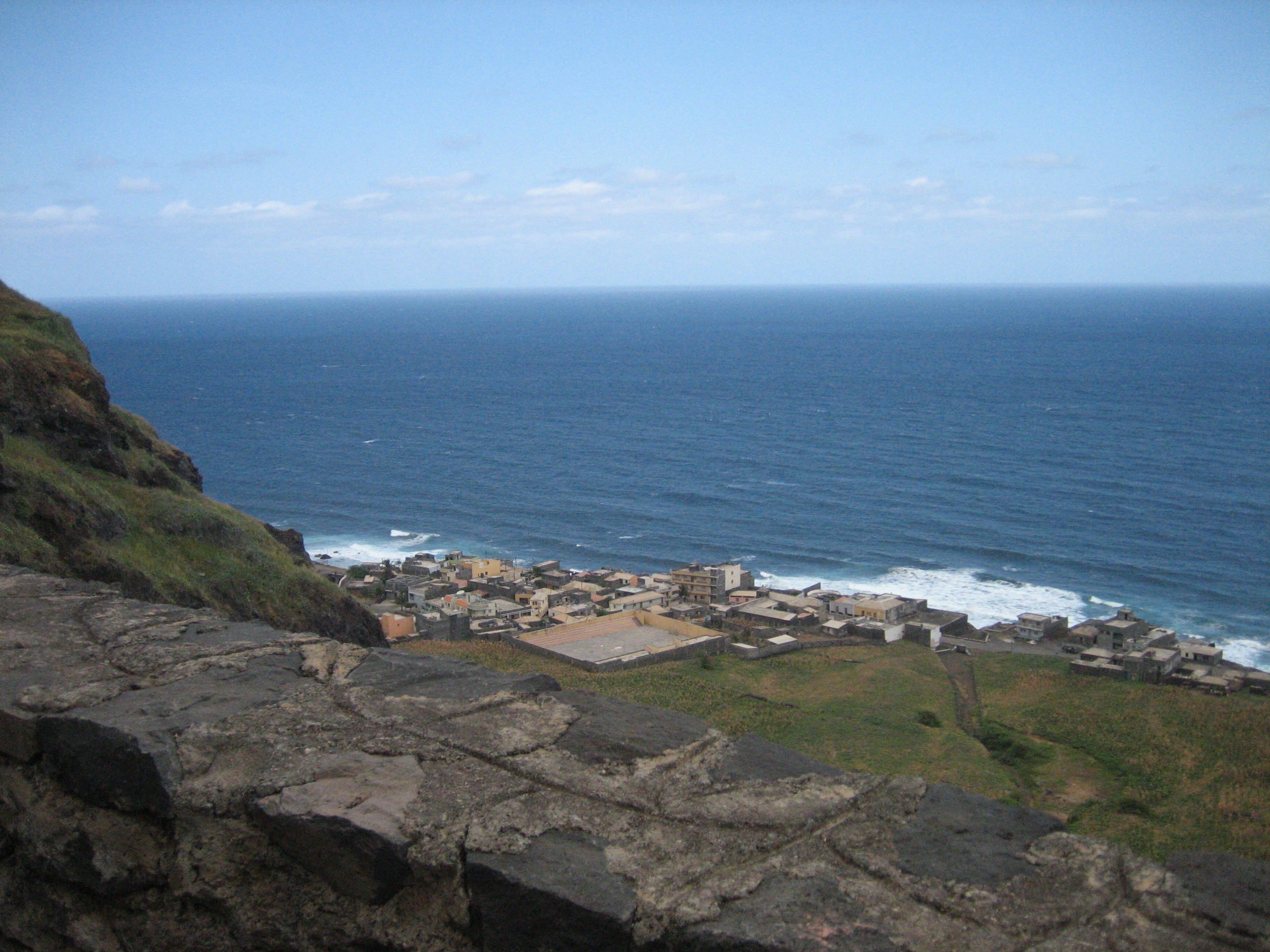

- Location within Cape Verde
- Coordinates: 15.048°N 24.353°W
- Country: Cape Verde
- Island: Fogo
- Municipality: Mosteiros
- Civil parish: Nossa Senhora da Ajuda

Population (2010)
  - Total: 84
- ID: 81104

Fajãzinha is a settlement in the northern part of the island of Fogo, Cape Verde. It is situated on the coast, 3 km northwest of Mosteiros and 23 km northeast of the island capital São Filipe. Each year on May 13, the festival of Our Lady of Fatima (Nossa Senhora de Fátima) is celebrated in the settlement.

== See also ==
- List of villages and settlements in Cape Verde
