= Sustainalytics =

International sustainability analytics company

- Industry: Financial services
- Predecessor: Jantzi Research, DSR, Siri Company, GES International
- Founded: 1992; 34 years ago
- Founder: Michael Jantzi
- Headquarters: Amsterdam, Netherlands
- Number of locations: 17
- Products: ESG Research & Ratings, Investment Stewardship
- Owner: Morningstar, Inc.
- Number of employees: 1000+
- Website: Sustainalytics

Sustainalytics is a company that rates the sustainability of listed companies based on their environmental, social and corporate governance (ESG) performance. The company was born of a merger between Toronto-based Jantzi Research, which was founded in 1992 by Sustainalytics' current CEO Michael Jantzi, and its European counterpart. Following its acquisition of GES International on January 9, 2019, Sustainalytics had more than 600 employees with offices in 17 cities around the world and over 700 institutional investor clients. On April 21, 2020, Morningstar, Inc. acquired the remaining ~60% of Sustainalytics' shares to become the sole owner.

== Morningstar acquisition ==
In 2016, Morningstar, Inc. released the first sustainability rating for mutual funds and exchange-traded funds based on Sustainalytics' company ESG research. In 2017, Morningstar, Inc. become a 40% shareholder in the company alongside senior management, Stichting Pensioenfonds Zorg en Welzijn (PGGM), ABN AMRO Group and Renewable Partners On 21 April 2020, Morningstar Inc. completed the acquisition, purchasing the remaining 60% of the shares.

== Yahoo! Finance ==
In 2018, Yahoo! Finance started to include Sustainalytics' ESG score for over 2,000 companies. Retail investors will also be able to see if companies are involved in controversies or controversial products or practices, such as thermal coal and controversial weapons.

== Green lending and green bonds ==
In 2017, ING Group issued the first sustainability improvement loan where the interest rate of the loan is pegged to the sustainability rating of the lender, Koninklijke Philips N.V., as measured by Sustainalytics. Sustainalytics also provides "second opinions" for corporate governmental issuers that assesses the framework of the issuer's green, social or sustainability bond. In 2017 and 2018, investors voted Sustainalyitcs as the "Most Impressive Second Opinion Provider" for this service in the GlobalCapital Sustainable and Responsible Capital Markets Awards 2017.

== Emissions scandals ==
Sustainalytics flagged governance concerns at Volkswagen months before the 2015 Volkswagen emissions scandal. Sustainalytics had also flagged corporate governance concerns at Fiat Automobiles 18 months prior to the company being accused of breaking emissions laws in 104,000 diesel vehicles in January 2017

== HBR's 100 best performing CEOs ==
In 2015, Harvard Business Review started to include Sustainalytics' ESG Rating as part of its assessment of the 100 best performing CEOs in the world.

== Indices ==
In 2000, Sustainalytics launched the Jantzi Social Index, the first socially-screened stock index composed of Canadian companies, and, in 2013, Sustainalytics partnered with the United Nations' Global Compact to launch the Global Compact 100 index, a real-time stock index that tracks Global Compact signatories awarded a high ESG rating by Sustainalytics. On 10 September 2018, the World Bank issued a sustainable development note linked to Sustainalytics' Global Sustainability Signatories Index, another index that tracks United Nations Global Compact signatories with high sustainability ratings. The note will not pay a coupon, but rather return the principle in addition to the positive return of the index.

Issues driving Morningstar / Sustainalytics ESG Risk Ratings
Category	Issue	Contribution to ESG Risk Rating
Environmental; 43.3%	Carbon - Own Operations	19.2%
Environmental; 43.3%	Resource Use	10.3%
Environmental; 43.3%	Emissions, Effluents and Waste	7.1%
Environmental; 43.3%	Environmental and Social Impact of Products and Services	6.7%
Social; 34.1%	Human Rights	22.8%
Social; 34.1%	Occupational Health and Safety	7.5%
Social; 34.1%	Community Relations	3.8%
Governance; 22.6%	Corporate Governance	11.9%
Governance; 22.6%	Business Ethics	6.7%
Governance; 22.6%	Human Capital	4.0%
