= Cabo Verde Express =

Cape Verdean airline

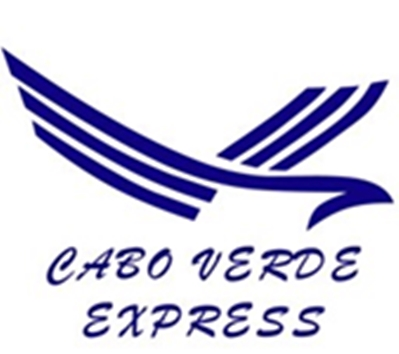
IATA	ICAO	Call sign
-	CVE	KABEX
- Founded: 1998
- Hubs: Amílcar Cabral International Airport
- Fleet size: 3
- Destinations: 7
- Headquarters: Espargos, Cape Verde
- Website: caboverdeexpress.com

Cabo Verde Express is a Cape Verdean regional airline headquartered in Espargos and based at Amílcar Cabral International Airport operating domestic scheduled and charter services.

== History ==
It was established in 1998 by Jean-Christophe Bartz, airline transport pilot and business man with many interests within the airline industry in West Africa. Operations started with a single Cessna Caravan (D4-CBJ). A few months later the Czech-made Let L-410 Turbolet were introduced. The airline employed 14 pilots including 2 freelancers.

The little airline grew fast under the command of Captain JC Bartz and actively contributed to the tourism development on the island of Boa Vista. Captain JC Bartz sold the airline back in 2007 to the Portuguese group Omni Aviacao, the owner of White Airways. Its head office is at the Amílcar Cabral International Airport in Espargos, Sal.

== Destinations ==
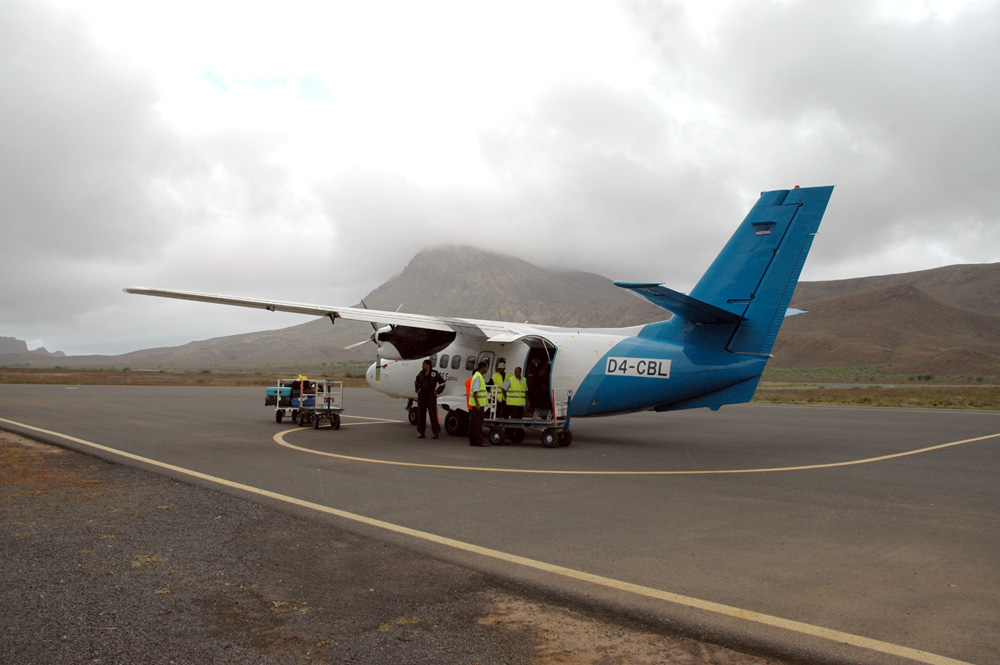
Let L-410 in the old livery

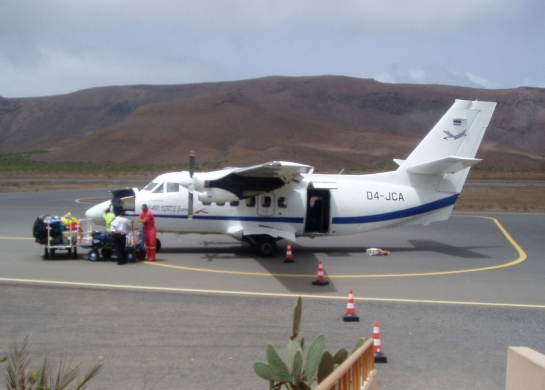
Let L-410 in the new livery

Cape Verde

- Boa Vista - Rabil Airport
- Fogo - São Filipe Airport
- Maio - Maio Airport
- Santiago - Praia International Airport
- Sal - Amílcar Cabral International Airport Hub
- Sao Nicolau - Preguiça Airport
- Sao Vicente - São Pedro Airport

== Fleet ==
As of April 2019 Cabo Verde Express has three aircraft:

Cabo Verde Express Fleet
Aircraft	Total	Notes	Passengers
Let L-410 Turbolet	3		19
