= Bestfly Cabo Verde =

Airline of Cape Verde

IATA	ICAO	Call sign
3B	BCV	MORABEZA
- Founded: 2015 as Binter Cabo Verde
- Commenced operations: 12 November 2016
- Ceased operations: 19 April 2024 (suspended)
- Hubs: Nelson Mandela International Airport
- Focus cities: Amílcar Cabral International Airport; Cesária Évora Airport
- Fleet size: 1
- Destinations: 7
- Parent company: BestFly World Wide (70%); Government of Cape Verde (30%)
- Headquarters: Praia, Cape Verde
- Website: bestflycaboverde.com

Bestfly Cabo Verde (legally, and previously doing business as TICV - Transportes Interilhas de Cabo Verde and founded in 2015 as Binter Cabo Verde) was a scheduled and charter, passenger and cargo regional airline based in Praia, Cape Verde. It operates inter-island services. Its main base is Nelson Mandela International Airport. The airline has suspended all flights to date since mid-2023 and has yet to resume any active service.

== History ==
=== Foundation ===
The airline was founded in 2015 as Binter Cabo Verde, a subsidiary of Spanish airline Binter Canarias. Operations commenced on 12 November 2016 with flights connecting the islands of Santiago, Sal and São Vicente. Binter Cabo Verde took over inter-island flights after TACV discontinued its domestic operations on 1 August 2017 due to restructuring and privatisation.

In August 2019, the airline changed its name from Binter Cabo Verde (Binter CV) to Transportes Interilhas de Cabo Verde (TICV). Binter Canarias divested in the airline in June 2021, selling its majority 70% stake to Angolan airline BestFly Worldwide with the remaining 30% owned by the Government of Cape Verde. The company has since rebranded the airline as Bestfly Cabo Verde.

=== Suspensions ===
In mid-2023, the airline briefly suspended most of its flights, citing operational difficulties. The airline announced the suspension of all operations again from 19 April until 7 May 2024, but has not resumed them since then. It has been reported that the airline suspended its Cabo Verde services due to issues with its ACMI operations.

== Destinations ==
As of July 2022, Bestfly Cabo Verde served all seven Cape Verde airports.

Island	Country	Airport	Notes
Boa Vista	Cape Verde	Aristides Pereira International Airport	
Maio	Cape Verde	Maio Airport	
Sal	Cape Verde	Amílcar Cabral International Airport	
Santiago	Cape Verde	Nelson Mandela International Airport	Hub
São Filipe	Cape Verde	São Filipe Airport	
Sao Nicolau	Cape Verde	Preguiça Airport	
São Vicente	Cape Verde	Cesária Évora Airport	

== Fleet ==
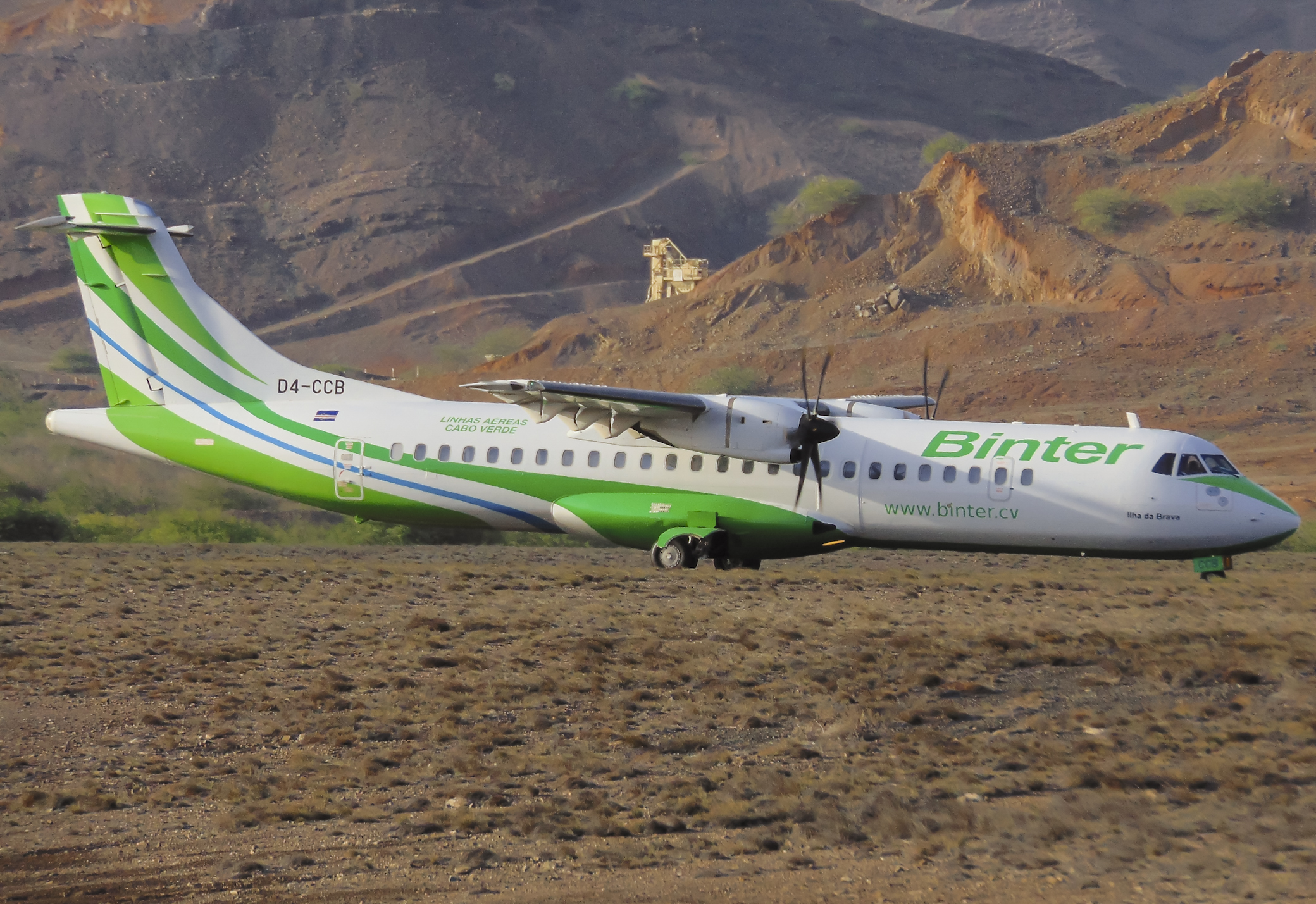
Bestfly Cabo Verde ATR 72-500 in former Binter Cabo Verde livery.

=== Current fleet ===
As of March 2024, the Bestfly Cabo Verde fleet consisted of the following aircraft:

Bestfly Cabo Verde fleet
Aircraft	In service	Orders	Passengers	Notes
ATR 72-500	1	—	72	stored
Total	1	—		

=== Former fleet ===
The airline previously also operated the following aircraft types:

- Embraer 190

== See also ==
- Binter Canarias
