= Feijoal, Fogo =

Settlement in Cape Verde

Feijoal
- Settlement
- Coordinates: 15.0292°N 24.329°W
- Country: Cape Verde
- Island: Fogo
- Municipality: Mosteiros
- Civil parish: Nossa Senhora da Ajuda
- Elevation: 220 m (720 ft)

Population (2010)
  - Total: 435
- ID: 81105

Feijoal (Portuguese pronunciation: [fɐjˈʒwal]) is a village on the island of Fogo, Cape Verde. It lies close to the town Mosteiros, at about 220 meters elevation. Its population was 435 at the 2010 census. The main festival in the settlement is Saint Anthony which is on June 13.

== See also ==
- List of villages and settlements in Cape Verde
