= Mosteiros, Cape Verde (municipality) =

Municipality of Cape Verde

Mosteiros
- Municipality
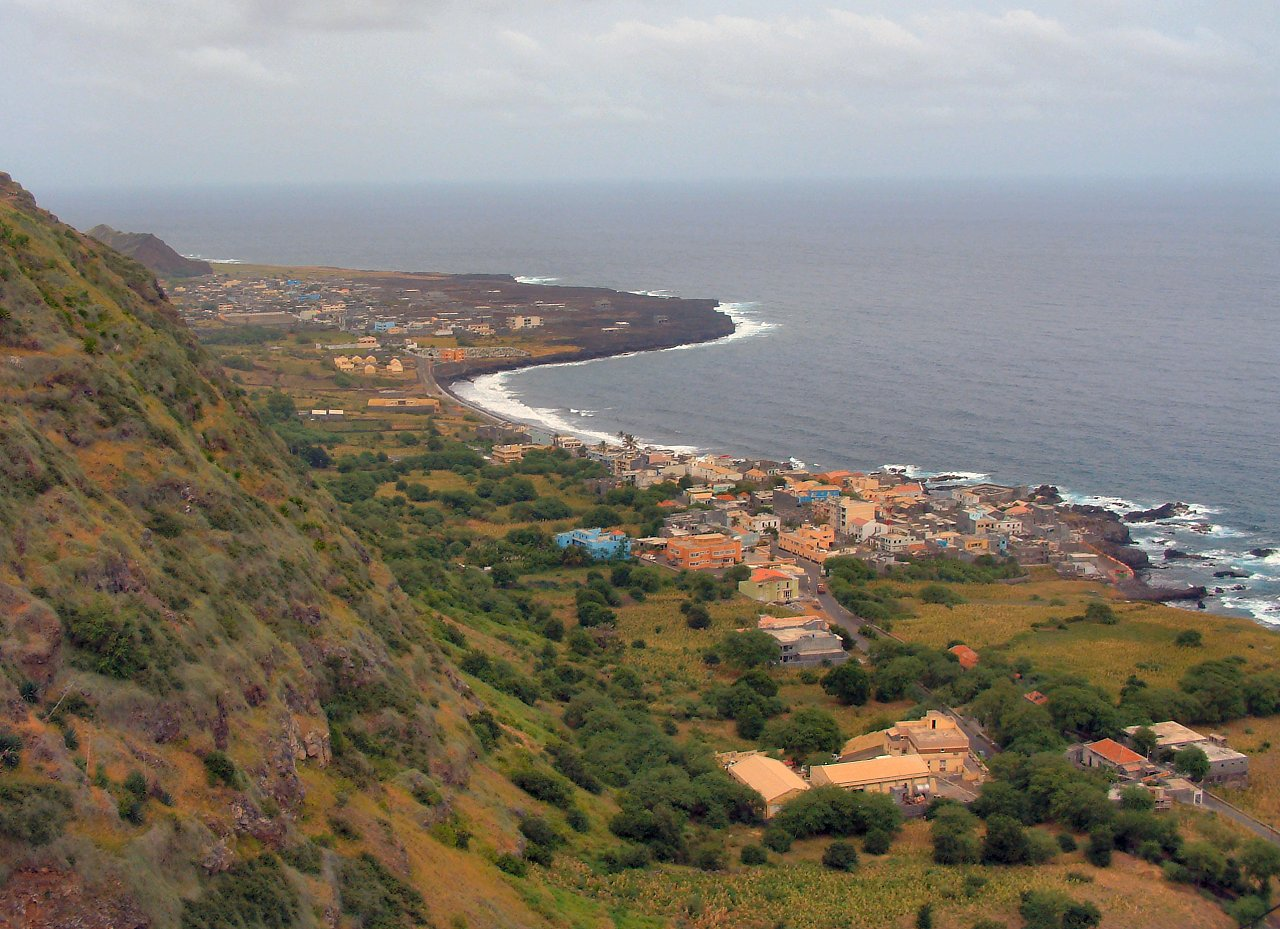
- View of the town of Mosteiros facing the northwest

- Flag

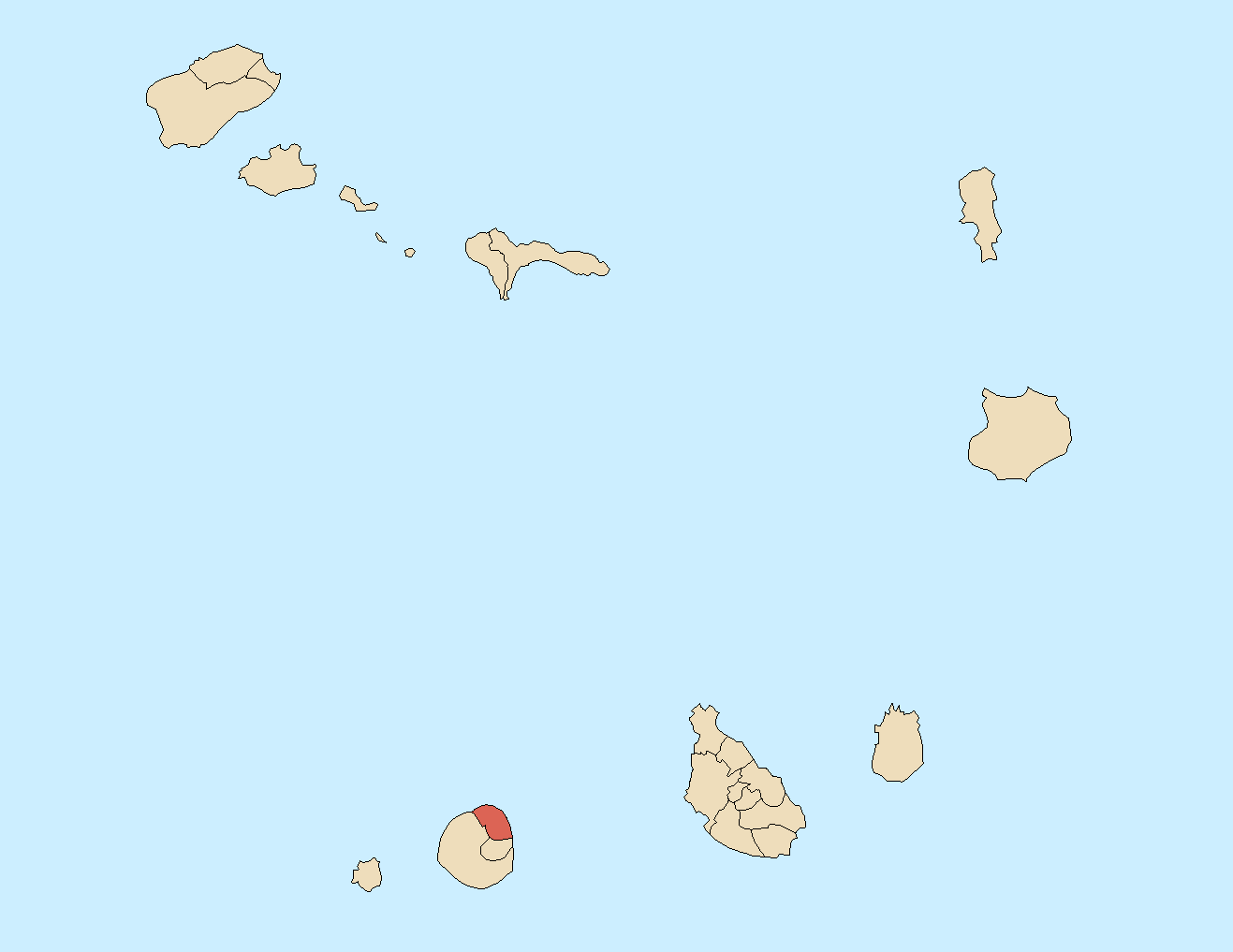
- Coordinates: 15.00°N 24.34°W
- Country: Cape Verde
- Island: Fogo

Area
  - Total: 89.45 km^{2} (34.54 sq mi)

Population (2010)
  - Total: 9,524
  - Density: 106.5/km^{2} (275.8/sq mi)
- ID: 81
- Website: Official website

Mosteiros is a concelho (municipality) of Cape Verde. Situated in the northeastern part of the island of Fogo, it covers 19% of the island area, and is home to 26% of its population. Its seat is the city Mosteiros (Igreja). Its population was 9,524 at the 2010 census, and its area is 89.45 km^{2}.

== Subdivisions ==
The municipality consists of one freguesia (civil parish), Nossa Senhora da Ajuda. The freguesia is subdivided into the following settlements (populations in 2010):

- Achada Grande (pop: 538)
- Atalaia (pop: 700)
- Corvo (pop: 340)
- Cova Feijoal (pop: 217)
- Cutelo Alto (pop: 281)
- Fajãzinha (pop: 84)
- Feijoal (pop: 435)
- Mosteiros (or Igreja) (pop: 4,124, city)
- Mosteiros Tras (pop: 37)
- Pai António (pop: 545)
- Relva (pop: 1,184)
- Ribeira do Ilhéu (pop: 848)
- Rocha Fora (pop: 187)

== Geography ==
Mosteiros is situated between the northeastern slopes of the volcano Pico do Fogo and the Atlantic Ocean. The southwestern part of the municipality (23.7 km^{2} (9.2 sq mi)) lies within Fogo Natural Park, which includes the Monte Velha Forest. Mosteiros is an agricultural area, its main product is coffee.

== History ==
The municipality Mosteiros was created in January 1992, when the older Municipality of Fogo was split in two, the southwestern part becoming the Municipality of São Filipe and the northeastern part becoming the Municipality of Mosteiros.

== Demography ==
Population of Mosteiros (1980—2010)
Year	Population
1980	7,427
1990	8,331
2000	9,535
2010	9,524

The literacy rate is 82.6%. 30.5% of the population are under the age of 15.

== Politics ==
Since 2004, the African Party for the Independence of Cape Verde (PAICV) is the ruling party of the municipality. The results of the latest elections, in 2016:

Party	Municipal Council		Municipal Assembly	
Party	Votes%	Seats	Votes%	Seats
PAICV	53.94	5	54.10	7
MpD	43.36	0	42.86	6
AMI	1.15	0	1.33	0

== Twin towns ==
- Azambuja, Portugal
- Entroncamento, Portugal
- Haría, Spain
