= Green money =

Green money refers to:

- Money used for ecological purposes (ecocurrency)
- Money from Islamic businesses, Islamic banks, and the religious sector
- Money for agricultural accounting

== See also ==
- Global warming
- Green lending
- Greenback
