= Feijoal, Amazonas =

Village in Benjamin Constant, Amazonas, Brazil

Coordinates: 4.296°S 69.538°W

Feijoal is a village in the municipality Benjamin Constant, in the state of Amazonas, Brazil. It is situated on the right bank of the river Solimões, 35 km downstream of the centre of Benjamin Constant.
