= GES International =

Engineering and manufacturing company

GES International Limited is an engineering and manufacturing company founded as a sole proprietorship called Goh Electronics Services by Goh Lik Tuan in 1975. It is based in Singapore and has an office in China. It is on the SGX, the Singapore stock exchange, and it is a listed component of the Straits Times Index. In 2006, it became a subsidiary of the Singapore-based Venture Corporation.

GES has two R&D (Research and Design) centers, in Singapore and Shanghai working in original design manufacturer (ODM) and original equipment manufacturer (OEM).

GES International performs manufacture and design (including ASIC design) as well as shipping (logistics) and aftermarket services.
