= Corvo, Cape Verde =

Corvo
- Settlement
- Coordinates: 14.999°N 24.305°W
- Country: Cape Verde
- Island: Fogo
- Municipality: Mosteiros
- Civil parish: Nossa Senhora da Ajuda

Population (2010)
  - Total: 340
- ID: 81103

Corvo (Portuguese pronunciation: [ˈkoɾvu]) is a settlement in the northeastern part of the island of Fogo, Cape Verde. It is situated near the coast, 5 km southeast of Mosteiros.

== See also ==
- List of villages and settlements in Cape Verde
