= Avation =

Aircraft-leasing company

Avation PLC
- Type: Public
- Traded as: LSE: AVAP
- Industry: Aircraft Leasing
- Founded: 2006
- Founder: Jeff Chatfield
- Headquarters: Singapore
- Website: www.avation.net

Avation PLC is a commercial passenger aircraft leasing company with airline customers around the world.

Avation is publicly owned and is listed on the Main Market of the London Stock Exchange (LSE:AVAP) and is headquartered in Singapore. Capital Lease Aviation Limited is a wholly owned subsidiary of Avation PLC.

== History ==
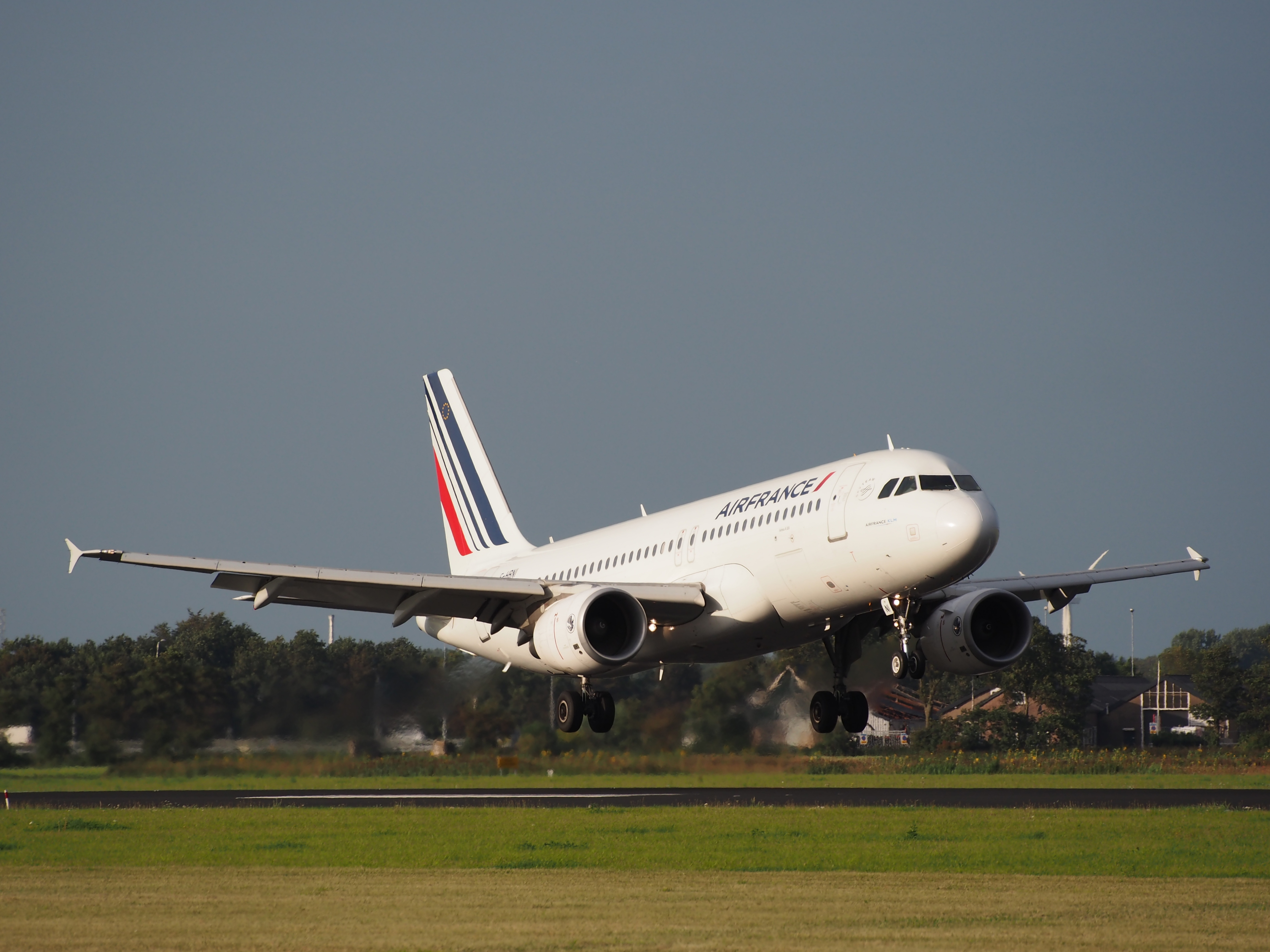
F-HBNI Air France Airbus A320-214 owned by Avation landing at Schiphol (EHAM-AMS) runway

Avation was founded in 2006 by Jeff Chatfield. The company was originally formed via a special dividend from Skywest Airlines Ltd with shares distributed in specie to all of the then Skywest Airlines Ltd shareholders.

The company was initially a narrow-body jet lessor which leased Fokker 100 and Airbus A320/A321 aircraft to Skywest Airlines Ltd and other airlines. In 2011 the Company ordered its first ATR72 aircraft and leased them to Skywest Airlines Ltd. On 11 April 2013 Virgin Australia Holdings completed its 100% acquisition of Skywest Airlines Ltd.

Since the Virgin Australia acquisition of Skywest Airlines Ltd, Avation has continued to grow organically as an independent aircraft leasing company. The Company developed its portfolio through a turboprop order book with ATR and has steadily added narrow-body and wide-body aircraft to its fleet. To fund these acquisitions Avation has issued bonds and shares on the London Stock Exchange.

In December 2019 Avation PLC procured the World's first certified aircraft green loan for a new commercial aircraft from Deutsche Bank. Sustainability indicator has been independently verified by the agency Vigeo Eiris.

== Awards ==
In May 2019, Airfinance Journal awarded Avation together with Air Baltic the 'Operating Lease Deal of the Year 2018'.

In January 2020, Avation PLC was awarded with the 'Aviation 100 European Editor's Deal of the Year for Innovation 2019' for financing new ATR 72-600 aircraft to Braathens Regional Airlines with the first green loan in aviation.
