= São Filipe Airport =

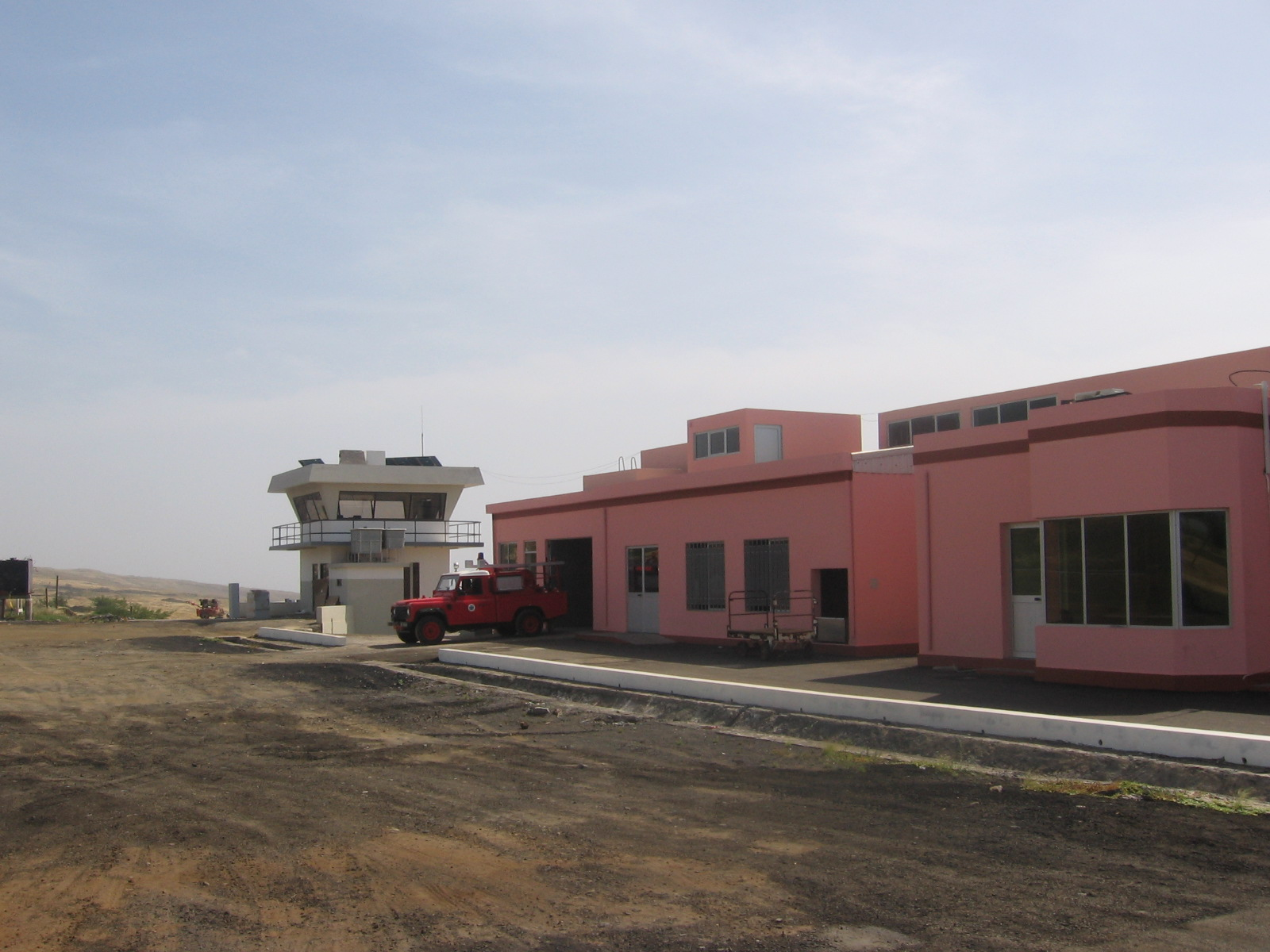
- IATA: SFL; ICAO: GVSF

Summary
- Airport type: Public
- Operator: Vinci Airports
- Serves: São Filipe
- Location: Fogo, Cape Verde
- Elevation AMSL: 170 m (560 ft)
- Coordinates: 14°52′58.8″N 24°28′48″W
- Website: www.caboverde-airports.cv

Map
- Location in Cape Verde

Runways
Direction	Length		Surface
Direction	m	ft	Surface
14/32	1,350	4,429	Asphalt

Statistics (2017)
- Passengers: 72949
- Aircraft Operations: 1418
- Metric tonnes of cargo: 20.6

São Filipe Airport (Portuguese: Aeródromo de São Filipe, also: Aeródromo do Fogo) (IATA: SFL, ICAO: GVSF) is Cape Verde's fifth most-used airport, located in the island of Fogo. It is located 2 km southeast of the town of São Filipe, near the Atlantic Ocean. It is used for domestic flights only.

== History ==
The airport was completed in 1997, replacing a smaller airfield at the same location. Its runway measures 1,350 metres (4,430 ft) by 30 metres (98 ft) wide. The maximum single-wheel load is 20 tonnes.

In July 2023 Vinci Airports finalized a financial arrangement to take over seven airports in Cape Verde under a concession agreement signed with the island country’s government. The company will be responsible for the funding, operation, maintenance, extension and modernization of the airports for 40 years, alongside its subsidiary ANA-Aeroportos de Portugal, which holds 30% of the concession company Cabo Verde Airports.

== Airlines and destinations ==
Airlines	Destinations
Cabo Verde Airlines	Praia

== Statistics ==
Year	Passengers	Operations	Cargo (t)
2012	74,408	-	-
2013	62,088	1,756	54
2016	55,168	1,052	25.6
2017	72,949	1,418	20.6

== See also ==
- Airports in Cape Verde
- List of buildings and structures in Cape Verde
