= Mosteiros, Cape Verde =

Mosteiros
- Settlement
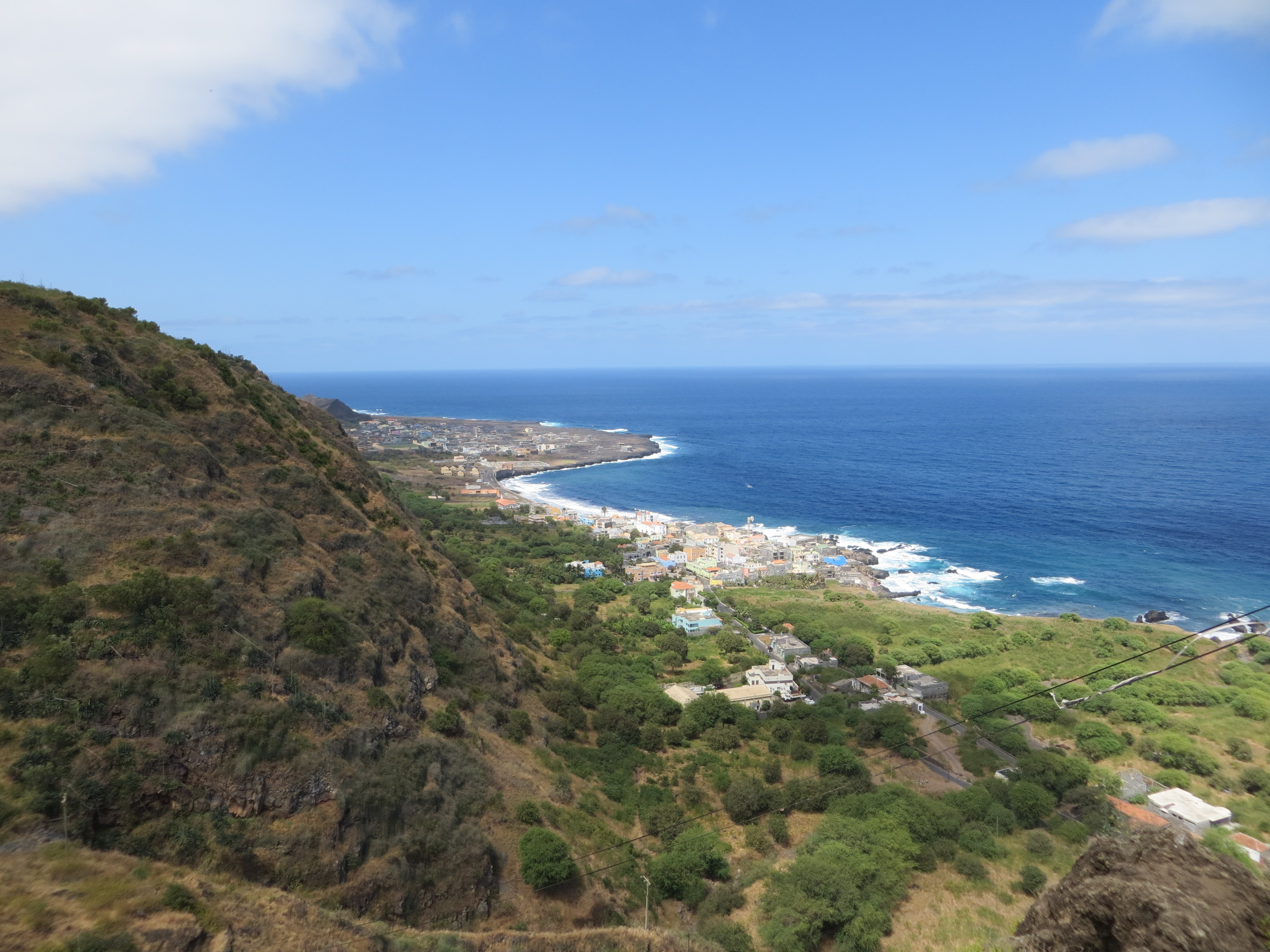
- View of Mosteiros

- Location within Cape Verde
- Coordinates: 15.034°N 24.325°W
- Country: Cape Verde
- Island: Fogo
- Municipality: Mosteiros
- Civil parish: Nossa Senhora da Ajuda

Population (2010)
  - Total: 4,124
- Postal code: 8110
- ID: 81106

Mosteiros (Portuguese pronunciation: [muʃˈtɐjɾuʃ]; also: Cidade da Igreja [siˈðaðɨ ðɐjˈɣɾɐjʒɐ]) is a city in the northeastern part of the island of Fogo, Cape Verde. It is situated on the coast, 24 kilometres or 15 miles northeast of the island capital São Filipe. It is the seat of the Mosteiros Municipality and of the civil parish Nossa Senhora da Ajuda. At the 2010 census its population was 9,524 making it the island's second most populated place.

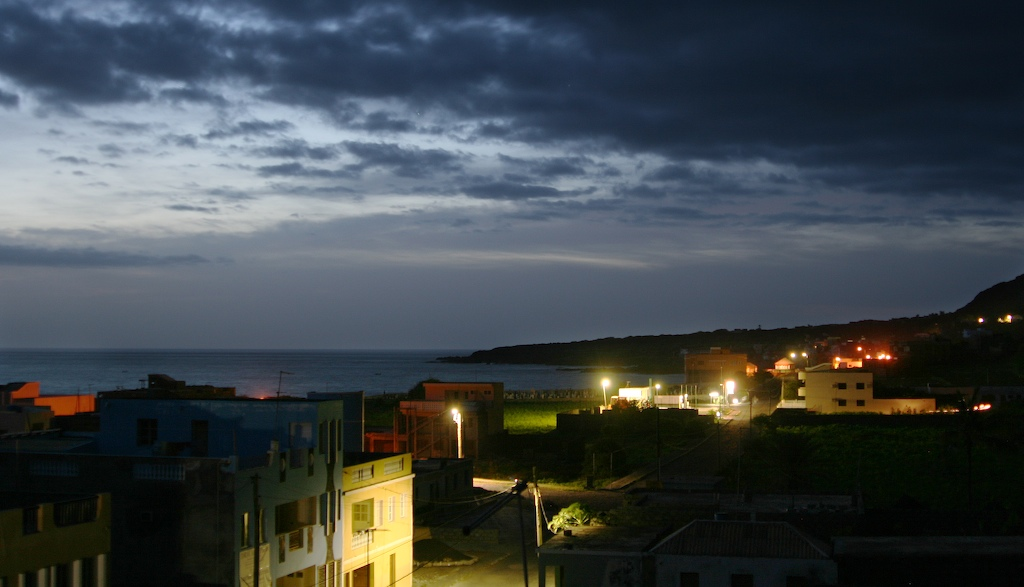
Morning in Mosteiros.

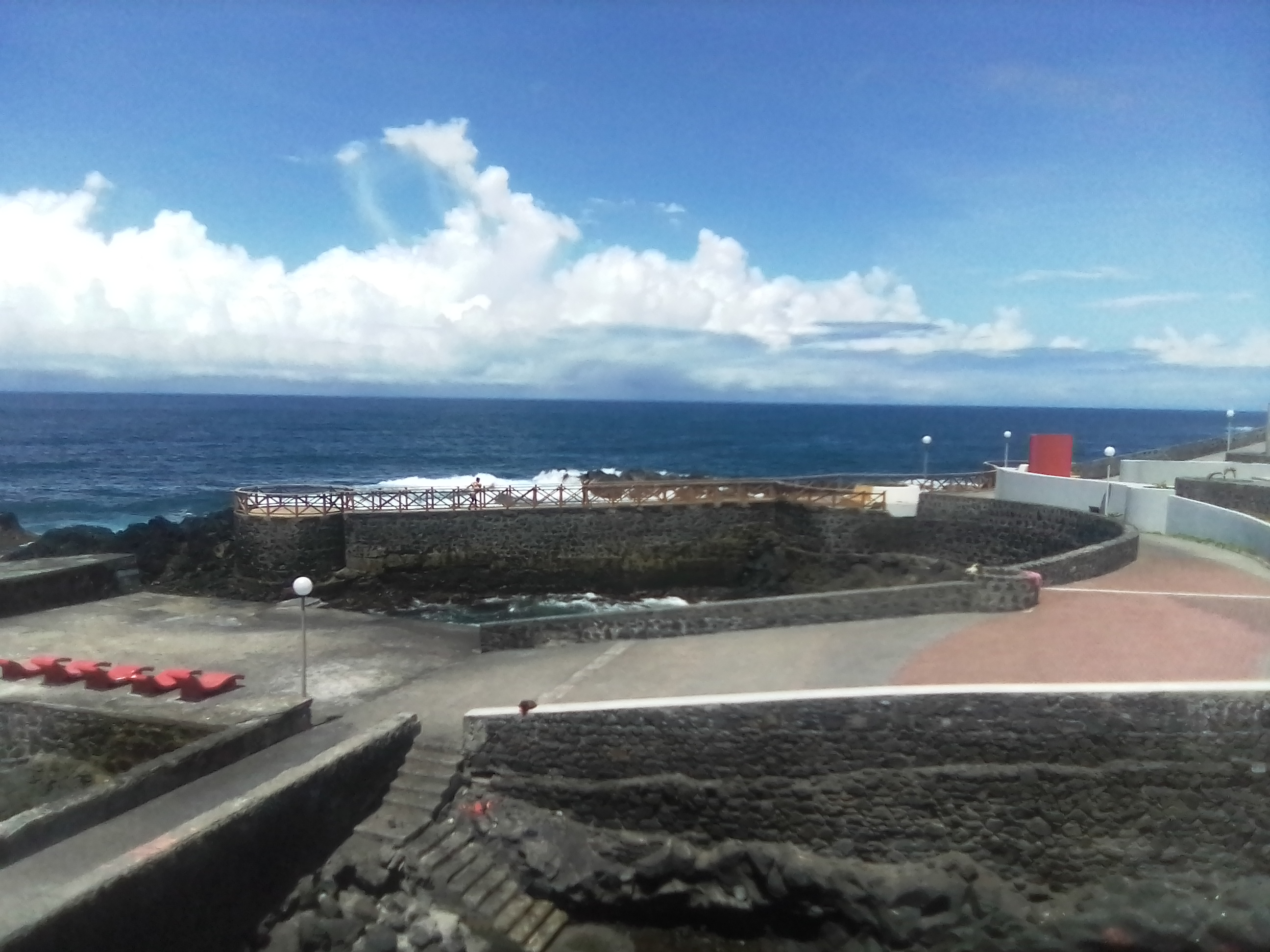
Beco Beach in downtown Igreja

The cultivation of coffee was introduced on Fogo in the 18th century. The coffee plantations in the municipality of Mosteiros are situated between 350 and 1,300 metres (1,100 and 4,300 ft) elevation, where they benefit from rich volcanic soils and a good micro-climate. Annual production was 500 tonnes in 1900, but this has declined to just over 100 tonnes per year. The church Igreja Matriz is worth a visit. Praça do Entroncamento is the town's main square. The local airport Mosteiros Airport has been closed in favor of São Filipe Airport. From São Filipe, Mosteiros can be reached by "aluguer" buses several times a day.

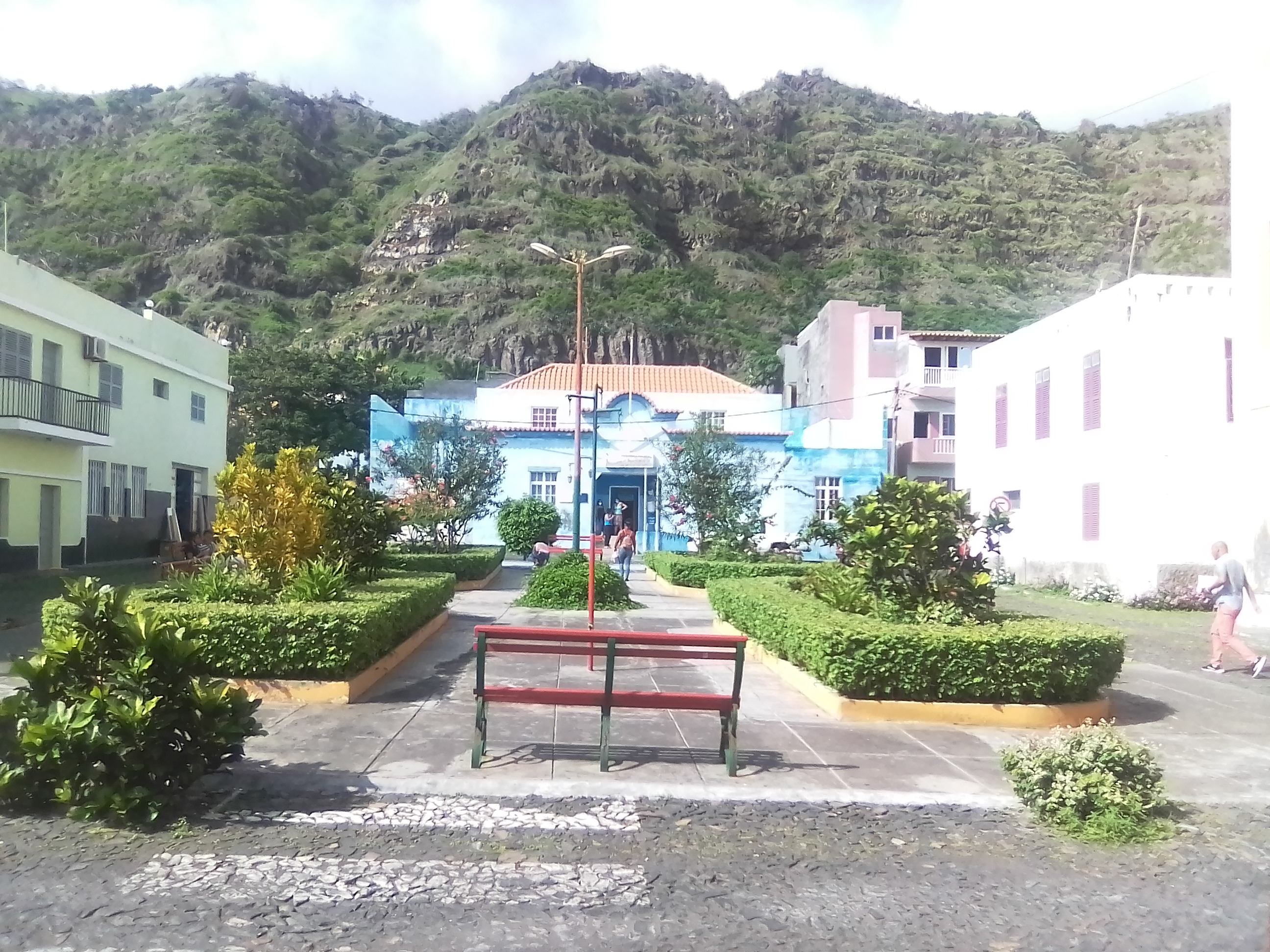
Entroncamento Square

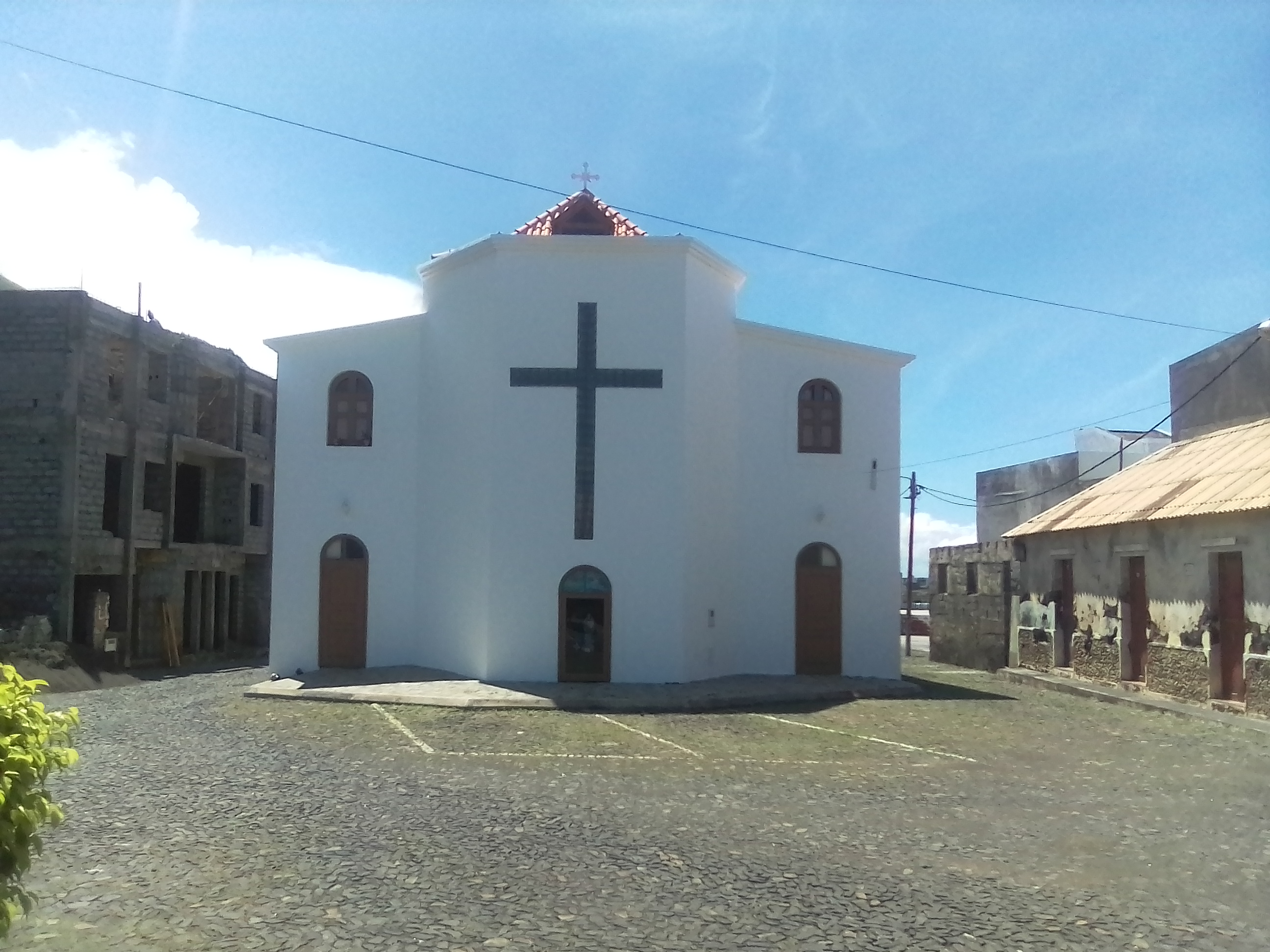
Church of Nossa Senhora da Ajuda

The main celebration is of Nossa Senhora da Ajuda celebrated around August 15.

== Climate ==
Mosteiros has a steppe climate (Köppen BSh). The wettest months are August and September. Average annual temperature is 23.2 °C or 73.8 °F.

== Sports ==
Cutelinho FC, Nô Pintcha FC dos Mosteiros and Atlético Mosteiros are the football (soccer) clubs of the city. There are also local basketball, futsal and volleyball teams. It has a football (soccer) stadium named Estádio Francisco José Rodrigues. Its multi-use indoor arena is named João de Joia.

== See also ==
- List of cities and towns in Cape Verde
