= Politics of Cape Verde =

Politics of Cape Verde takes place in a framework of a semi-presidential representative democratic republic, whereby the Prime Minister of Cape Verde is the head of government and the President of the Republic of Cape Verde is the head of state, and of a multi-party system. Executive power is exercised by the president and the government. Legislative power is vested in both the government and the National Assembly. The judiciary is independent of the executive and the legislature.

The constitution, first approved in 1980 and substantially revised in 1992, forms the basis of government organization. It declares that the government is the "organ that defines, leads, and executes the general internal and external policy of the country" and is responsible to the National Assembly. The first multi-party presidential and parliamentary elections were held in 1991.

Prior to 1991, Cape Verde was a single-party state. Since 1991, Cape Verde politics has been characterized by competition between PAICV and MpD.

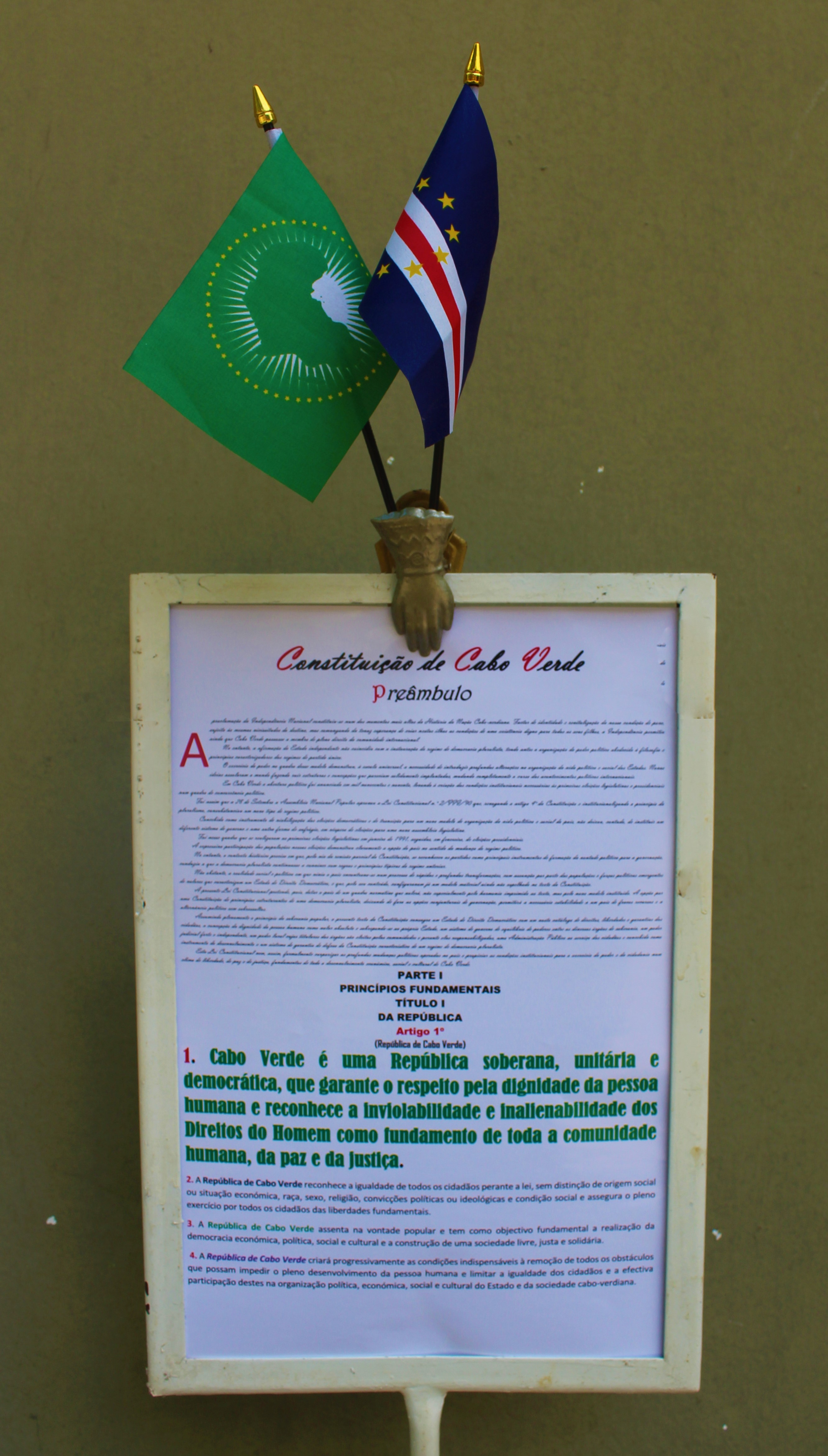
Constitution of Cape Verde.

== Political conditions ==
Following independence in 1975, the African Party for the Independence of Guinea and Cape Verde (PAIGC) established a one-party political system. This became the African Party for the Independence of Cape Verde (PAICV) in 1980, as Cape Verde sought to distance itself from Guinea-Bissau, following unrest in that country.

In 1991, following growing pressure for a more pluralistic society, multi-party elections were held for the first time. The opposition party, the Movement for Democracy (Movimento para a Democracia, MpD), won the legislative elections, and formed the government. The MpD candidate also defeated the PAICV candidate in the presidential elections. In the 1996 elections, the MpD increased their majority, but in the 2001 the PAICV returned to power, winning both the Legislative and the Presidential elections.

Generally, Cape Verde enjoys a stable democratic system. The elections have been considered free and fair, there is a free press, and the rule of law is respected by the State. In acknowledgment of this, Freedom House granted Cape Verde two first places in its annual Freedom in the World report, a perfect score. It is the only African country to receive this score. The Economist Intelligence Unit rated Cape Verde a "flawed democracy" in 2023. It is also the most electorally democratic and the third-most liberally democratic nation in Africa in the V-Dem Democracy Indices.

The Prime Minister is the head of the government and as such proposes other ministers and secretaries of state. The Prime Minister is nominated by the National Assembly and appointed by the President. The President is the head of state and is elected by popular vote for a five-year term; the most recent elections were held in 2021.

Also in the legislative branch, the National Assembly (Assembleia Nacional) has 72 members, elected for a five-year term by proportional representation.

Movement for Democracy (MpD) ousted the ruling African Party for the Independence of Cape Verde (PAICV) for the first time in 15 years in the 2016 parliamentary election. The leader of MpD, Ulisses Correia e Silva has been prime minister since 2016. Jorge Carlos Almeida Fonseca was elected president in August 2011 and re-elected in October 2016. He is also supported by MpD.

In April 2021, the ruling centre-right Movement for Democracy (MpD) of Prime Minister Ulisses Correia e Silva, won the parliamentary election. In October 2021, opposition candidate and former prime minister, José Maria Neves of PAICV, won Cape Verde's presidential election. On 9 November 2021, José Maria Neves was sworn in as the new President of Cape Verde.

== Courts and criminal law ==
The judicial system is composed of the Supreme Court and the regional courts. Of the five Supreme Court judges, one is appointed by the President, one by the National Assembly, and three by the Superior Judiciary Council. This council consists of the President of the Supreme Court, the Attorney General, eight private citizens, two judges, two prosecutors, the senior legal inspector of the Attorney General's office, and a representative of the Ministry of Justice. Judges are independent and may not belong to a political party. In October 2000, a female judge who was known for taking strict legal measures in cases of domestic violence was transferred from the capital to the countryside. Separate courts hear civil, constitutional and criminal cases. Appeal is to the Supreme Court. Reforms to strengthen an overburdened judiciary were implemented in 1998. Free legal counsel is provided to indigents, defendants are presumed innocent until proven guilty, and trials are public. Judges must lay charges within 24 hours of arrests. The Constitution provides for an independent judiciary, and the government generally respects this provision in practice. The constitution provides for the right to a fair trial and due process, and an independent judiciary usually enforces this right. Unlike in the previous year, there were no reports of politicization and biased judgement in the judiciary. Cases involving former public office holders still are under investigation. For example, investigations continued in the case of the former prime minister accused of embezzlement in the privatization of ENACOL (a parastatal oil supply firm) in which he allegedly embezzled approximately $16,250 (2 million Cape Verdean escudos) from the buyers of the parastatal. The case of four persons accused of church desecration in 1996 also was under investigation. These individuals filed a complaint with the Attorney General against the judiciary police for alleged fabrication of evidence.

The constitution provides for the right to a fair trial. Defendants are presumed to be innocent; they have the right to a public, non-jury trial; to counsel; to present witnesses; and to appeal verdicts. Regional courts adjudicate minor disputes on the local level in rural areas. The Ministry of Justice does not have judicial powers; such powers lie with the courts.

The judiciary generally provides due process rights; however, the right to an expeditious trial is constrained by a seriously overburdened and understaffed judicial system. A backlog of cases routinely leads to trial delays of 6 months or more; more than 10,780 cases were pending at year's end. In addition the right of victims to compensation and recovery for pain and mental suffering are overlooked, due both to the low damage assessments imposed and ineffective enforcement of court sentences.

== Administrative divisions ==
Cape Verde is divided into 22 municipalities (concelhos, singular - concelho): Boa Vista, Brava, Maio, Mosteiros, Paul, Porto Novo, Praia, Ribeira Grande, Ribeira Grande de Santiago, Sal, Santa Catarina, Santa Catarina do Fogo, Santa Cruz, São Domingos, São Filipe, São Lourenço dos Órgãos, São Miguel, São Nicolau, São Salvador do Mundo, São Vicente, Tarrafal, Tarrafal de São Nicolau.

== Voting rights for non citizens ==
Article 24 of the Cape Verde Constitution states that

- alinea 3.: "Rights not conferred to foreigners and apatrids may be attributed to citizens of countries with Portuguese as an official language, except for access to functions of sovereignty organs, service in the armed forces or in the diplomatic career."
- alinea 4. "Active and passive electoral capacity can be attributed by law to foreigners and apatrid residents on the national territory for the elections of the members of the organs of the local municipalities."

The website of the governmental Institute of Cape Verde Communities states that such a measure was adopted "to stimulate reciprocity from host countries of Cape Verdian migrants".

A law nr. 36/V/97 was promulgated on August 25, 1997, regulating the "Statute of Lusophone Citizen", concerning nationals from any country member of the Community of Portuguese Language Countries (article 2), stating in its article 3 that "The lusophone citizen with residence in Cape Verde is recognized the active and passive electoral capacity for municipal elections, under conditions of the law. The lusophone citizen with residence in Cape Verde has the right to exercise political activity related to his electoral capacity."

== International organization participation ==
ACCT, ACP, AfDB, AU, CCC, ECA, ECOWAS, FAO, G-77, IBRD, ICAO, ICRM, IDA, IFAD, IFC, IFRCS, ILO, IMF, IMO, Intelsat, Interpol, IOC, IOM (observer), ITU, ITUC, NAM, OAU, OPCW, UN, UNCTAD, UNESCO, UNIDO, UPU, WHO, WIPO, WMO, WTO (applicant)
