= List of political parties in Cape Verde =

This article lists political parties in Cape Verde. Cape Verde has a two-party system, which means that there are two dominant political parties (PAICV and MpD), with extreme difficulty for anybody to achieve electoral success under the banner of any other party.

== List of parties ==
=== Parties represented in the National Assembly ===
Party	Abbr.	Founded	Leader	Political position	Ideology	Assembly
African Party for the Independence of Cape Verde; Partido Africano da Independência de Cabo Verde	PAICV	1981	Francisco Carvalho	Centre-left to left-wing	Democratic socialism; Social democracy; Left-wing nationalism	37 / 72
Movement for Democracy; Movimento para a Democracia	MpD	1990	Ulisses Correia e Silva	Centre to centre-right	Liberalism; Christian democracy	33 / 72
Democratic and Independent Cape Verdean Union; União Caboverdiana Independente e Democrática	UCID	1981	João Santos Luís	Centre-right to right-wing	Conservatism; Christian democracy	2 / 72

=== Other parties ===
- Democratic Convergence Party (Partido da Convergência Democrática, PCD)
- Democratic Renewal Party (Partido da Renovação Democrática, PRD)
- Labour and Solidarity Party (Partido de Trabalho e Solidariedade, PTS)
- Social Democratic Party (Partido Social Democrático, PSD)

== Defunct alliance ==
- Democratic Alliance for Change (Aliança Democrática para a Mudança, ADM)

== See also ==
- Lists of political parties
