= Democratic and Independent Cape Verdean Union =

Political party in Cape Verde

Democratic and Independent Cape Verdean Union União Caboverdiana Independente e Democrática
- Founded: 1981
- Headquarters: Praia, Santiago Island, Cape Verde
- Ideology: Conservatism; Social conservatism Christian democracy
- Political position: Centre-right to right-wing
- National Assembly: 2 / 72

Website
- http://www.ucid.cv/

The Democratic and Independent Cape Verdean Union (Portuguese: União Caboverdiana Independente e Democrática, UCID) is a conservative political party in Cape Verde.

== History ==
The party had its roots in the Democratic Union of Cape Verde (União Democrática de Cabo Verde, UDCV), a group that emerged from the Juridicial Congress of Cape Verde on 23 February 1975. However, the UDCV was excluded from negotiations on independence with the Portuguese government.

The Democratic and Independent Cape Verdean Union was formally established in Lisbon, Portugal in 1981 by a group of centre-right Cape Verdean exiles. When multi-party politics was introduced at the start of the 1990s, the party did not contest the 1991 parliamentary elections after failing to file its application papers in time. In internal elections in 1993, Celso Celestino was elected as the party's new leader.

In the 1995 parliamentary elections, the party received just 2,369 votes (1.5%), failing to win a seat. It supported incumbent President António Mascarenhas Monteiro of the Movement for Democracy in the 1996 presidential elections, with Monteiro winning unopposed.

In the buildup to the January 2001 parliamentary elections, the party joined the Democratic Alliance for Change (ADM), a coalition including the Democratic Convergence Party and the Labour and Solidarity Party. The alliance received 6% of the vote, winning two seats in the National Assembly. In the presidential elections a month later, ADM candidate Jorge Carlos Fonseca finished third of the four candidates with 3% of the vote.

The UCID contested the 2006 parliamentary elections alone, winning two seats with 2.6% of the vote. It did not nominate a candidate for the presidential elections later in the year. It retained both seats in the 2011 parliamentary elections, increasing its vote share to 4.4%. It did not nominate a candidate for the 2011 presidential elections. After the 2016 parliamentary election, UCID has three seats, one additional.

== Electoral history ==
=== Presidential elections ===
Election	Party candidate	Votes	%	Votes	%	Result
Election	Party candidate	First Round		Second Round		Result
1996	Supported António Mascarenhas Monteiro (MpD)	81,821	92.1%	-	-	Elected ✓
2001	Supported Jorge Carlos Fonseca (ADM)	5,142	3.88%	-	-	Lost ✗
2011	Supported Aristides Lima (Independent)	44,648	27.71%	-	-	Lost ✗
2021	Supported Carlos Veiga (MpD)	78,603	42.39%	-	-	Lost ✗

=== National Assembly elections ===
Election	Party leader	Votes	%	Seats	+/–	Position	Result
1995	Celso Celestino	2,369	1.54%	0 / 72	Steady	▲4th	Extra-parliamentary
2001	António Delgado Monteiro	8,389 as part of ADM	6.12%	0 / 72	Steady	▲3rd	Extra-parliamentary
2006	António Delgado Monteiro	4,495	2.64%	2 / 72	▲2	3rd	Opposition
2011	António Delgado Monteiro	9,842	4.39%	2 / 72	Steady	3rd	Opposition
2016	António Delgado Monteiro	15,488	6.87%	3 / 72	▲1	3rd	Opposition
2021	António Delgado Monteiro	19,834	9.01%	4 / 72	▲1	3rd	Opposition
2026	João Santos Luís	9,812	5.20%	2 / 72	▼2	3rd	Opposition
