= List of prime ministers of Cape Verde =

Prime Minister of the Republic of Cape Verde
- Primeiro-Ministro da República de Cabo Verde (Portuguese)
- National emblem of Cape Verde

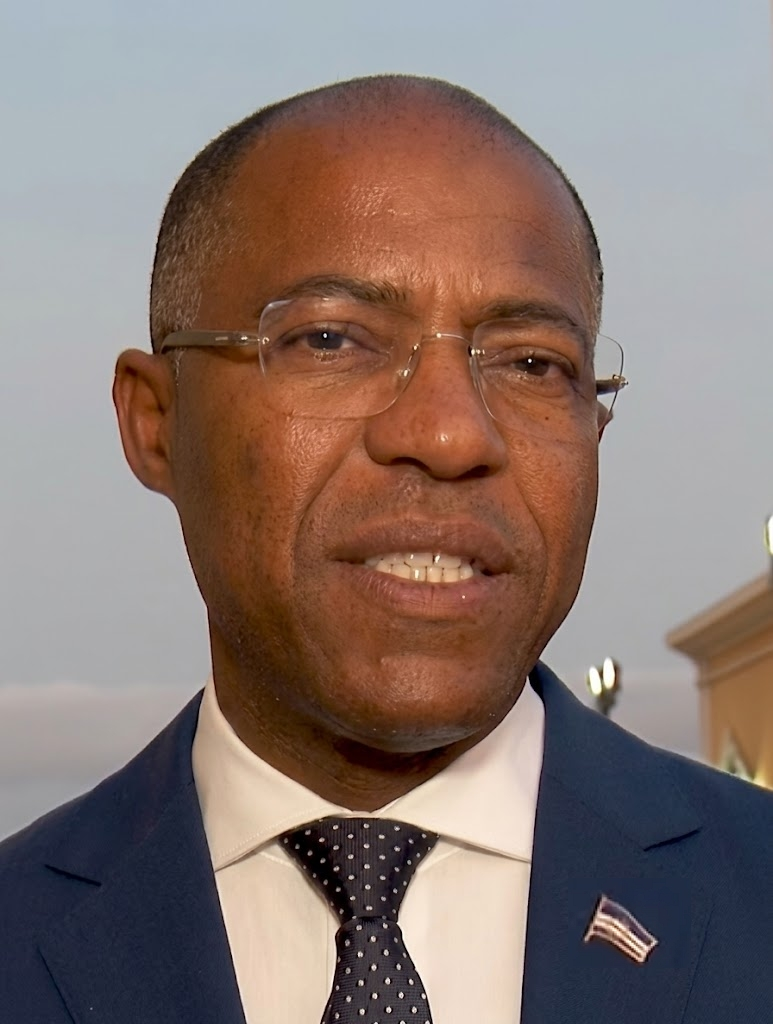
- Incumbent; Francisco Carvalho since 19 June 2026
- Executive branch of the Government of Cape Verde
- Type: Head of government
- Member of: the Cabinet; National Assembly
- Appointer: President of Cape Verde
- Term length: 5 years; renewable
- Constituting instrument: Constitution of Cape Verde (1980)
- Formation: 8 July 1975; 51 years ago
- First holder: Pedro Pires
- Website: Official website

This article lists the prime ministers of Cape Verde, an island country in the Atlantic Ocean off the coast of West Africa, since the establishment of the office of prime minister in 1975. Pedro Pires was the first person to hold the office, taking effect on 8 July 1975. The incumbent is Francisco Carvalho, having taken office on 19 June 2026.

== List of officeholders ==
Political parties

African Party for the Independence of Guinea and Cape Verde (PAIGC)
African Party for the Independence of Cape Verde (PAICV)
Movement for Democracy (MpD)

No.	Portrait	Name (Birth–Death)	Term of office			Political party	Elected	Government	Ref.
No.	Portrait	Name (Birth–Death)	Took office	Left office	Time in office	Political party	Elected	Government	Ref.
1		Pedro Pires (born 1934)	8 July 1975	4 April 1991	15 years, 270 days	PAIGC (until 1981)	1975	Pires I	
1		Pedro Pires (born 1934)	8 July 1975	4 April 1991	15 years, 270 days	PAIGC (until 1981)	1980	Pires II	
1		Pedro Pires (born 1934)	8 July 1975	4 April 1991	15 years, 270 days	PAICV (from 1981)	1985	Pires III	
2		Carlos Veiga (born 1949)	4 April 1991	29 July 2000	9 years, 116 days	MpD	1991	Veiga I	
2		Carlos Veiga (born 1949)	4 April 1991	29 July 2000	9 years, 116 days	MpD	1995	Veiga II	
–		Gualberto do Rosário (born 1950)	29 July 2000	5 October 2000	68 days	MpD	–	Veiga II	
3		Gualberto do Rosário (born 1950)	5 October 2000	1 February 2001	119 days	MpD	–	do Rosário	
4		José Maria Neves (born 1960)	1 February 2001	22 April 2016	15 years, 81 days	PAICV	2001	Neves I	
4		José Maria Neves (born 1960)	1 February 2001	22 April 2016	15 years, 81 days	PAICV	2006	Neves II	
4		José Maria Neves (born 1960)	1 February 2001	22 April 2016	15 years, 81 days	PAICV	2011	Neves III	
4		José Maria Neves (born 1960)	1 February 2001	22 April 2016	15 years, 81 days	PAICV	2011	Neves IV	
4		José Maria Neves (born 1960)	1 February 2001	22 April 2016	15 years, 81 days	PAICV	2011	Neves V	
4		José Maria Neves (born 1960)	1 February 2001	22 April 2016	15 years, 81 days	PAICV	2011	Neves VI	
5		Ulisses Correia e Silva (born 1962)	22 April 2016	19 June 2026	10 years, 58 days	MpD	2016	Silva I	
5		Ulisses Correia e Silva (born 1962)	22 April 2016	19 June 2026	10 years, 58 days	MpD	2021	Silva II	
6		Francisco Carvalho (born 1970)	19 June 2026	Incumbent	135 days	PAICV	2026	Carvalho	

=== Timeline ===
This is a graphical lifespan timeline of the prime ministers of Cape Verde. They are listed in order of first assuming office.

The following chart lists prime ministers by lifespan (living prime ministers on the green line), with the years outside of their tenure in beige.

The following chart shows prime ministers by their age (living prime ministers in green), with the years of their tenure in blue.

== See also ==
- Politics of Cape Verde
- List of presidents of Cape Verde
- List of colonial governors of Cape Verde
