= Constitution of Cape Verde =

The Constitution of Cape Verde is the supreme law of the Republic of Cabo Verde. Adopted in 1980, the constitution has been amended seven times.

== Background and history ==
Cape Verde is a country that consists of a group of islands off the western coast of Senegal. The Portuguese arrived in Cape Verde in 1462, and the islands became a part of the Portuguese Empire in 1495. After many Caboverdeans fought in the Guinea-Bissau War of Independence from 1963 to 1974, both Guinea-Bissau and Cape Verde were eventually granted independence. After Cape Verde's independence on 5 July 1975, the organization responsible for the movement, the African Party for the Independence of Guinea and Cape Verde (PAIGC), initially worked for the unification of Guinea-Bissau and Cape Verde. However, after the 1980 Guinea-Bissau coup d'état, the two countries separated, and the PAIGC became the African Party for the Independence of Cape Verde (PAICV). In 1980, the first version of the constitution was written and adopted, and in 1981 it was amended to include Article 4, which established the PAICV as the only legal political party, forming a one-party state.

Originally intended to be a socialist state with a planned economy, the PAICV remained in power until the constitution was amended in 1990, when Article 4 was repealed from the constitution. Subsequently, in the 1991 Cape Verdean parliamentary election, Movement for Democracy (MpD) won approximately 70% of the seats in the National Assembly.

Another amendment to the constitution was adopted on 4 September 1992 and went into effect on 25 September 1992. Modeled after the Constitution of Portugal, the new amendment entrenched the ideas of political pluralism and a balance of powers in government, creating a multi-party system. This was further expanded upon by an amendment in 1999, which specifically defined the nation as "a sovereign, unitary and democratic republic, which guarantees respect for human dignity and recognises the inviolability and inalienability of human rights as the foundation of the entire human community, of peace and of justice". The constitution was last amended in 2010.
