= 2011 Cape Verdean parliamentary election =

- 6 February 2011

All 72 seats in the National Assembly of Cape Verde 37 seats needed for a majority
- Registered: 298,567
- Turnout: 76.01%
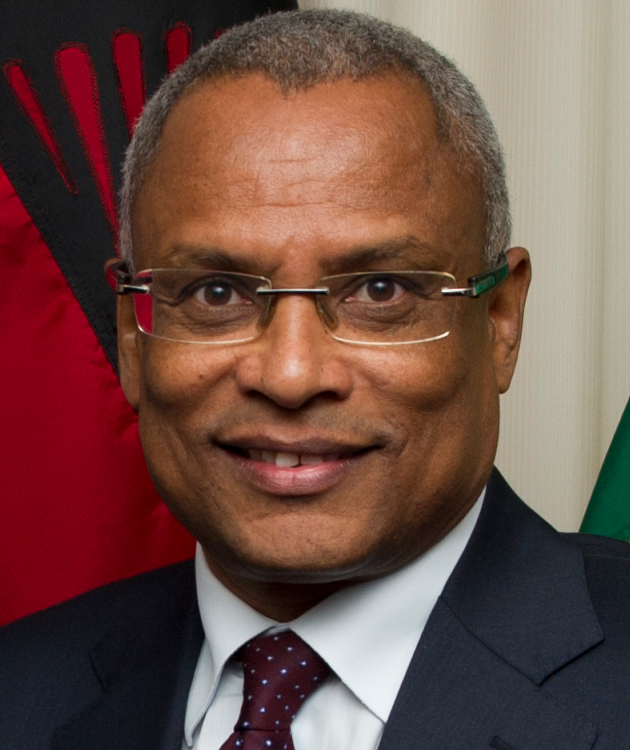

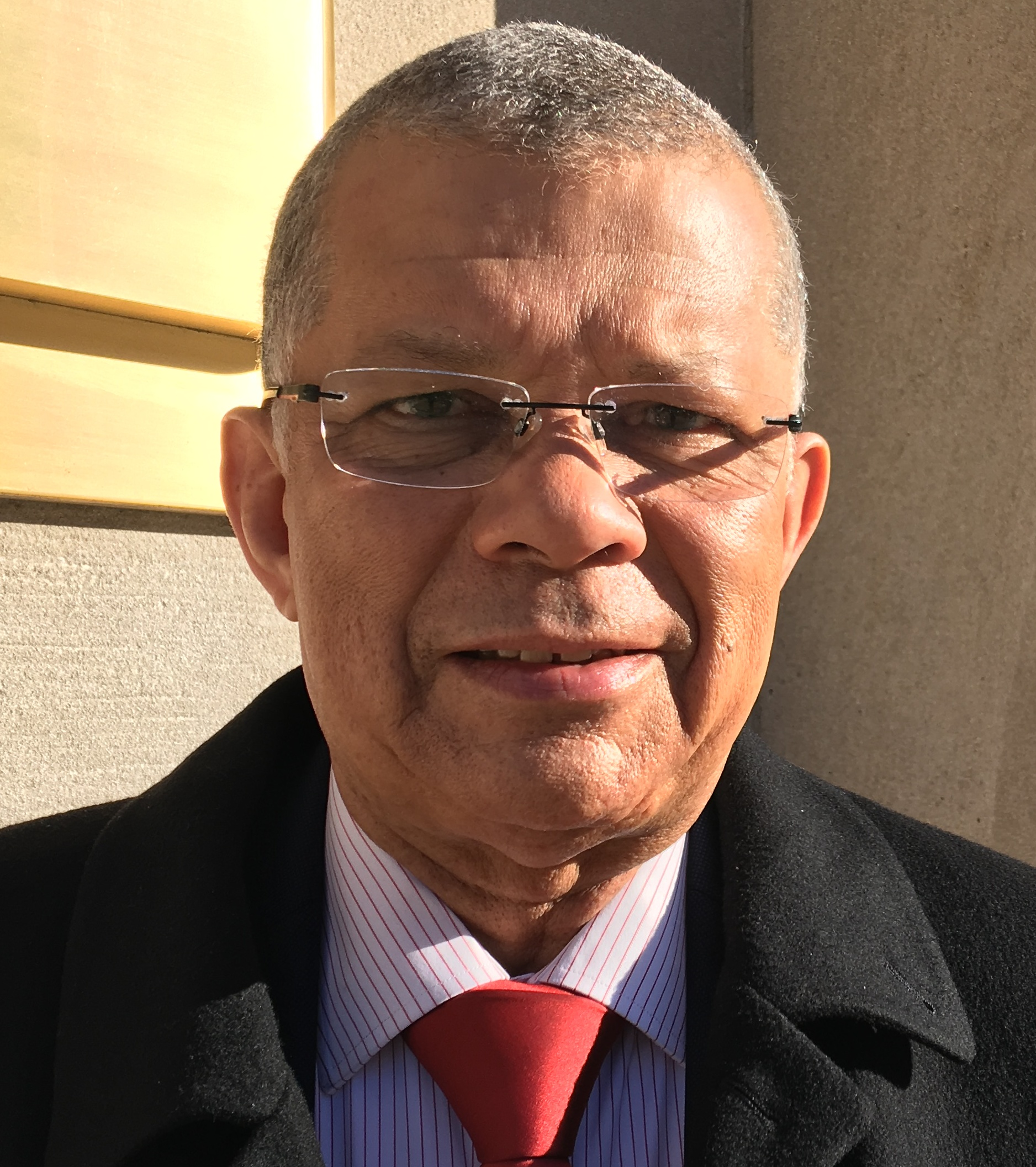

	First party	Second party	Third party
Leader	José Maria Neves	Carlos Veiga	António Monteiro
Party	PAICV	MpD	UCID
Leader's seat	Santiago Sul	Santiago Sul	São Vicente
Seats won	38	32	2
Seat change	▼3	▲3	Steady
Popular vote	117,967	94,674	9,842
Percentage	52.68%	42.27%	4.39%
Prime Minister before election
José Maria Neves
PAICV
Elected Prime Minister
José Maria Neves
PAICV

Parliamentary elections were held Cape Verde on 6 February 2011. The result was a victory for the ruling African Party for the Independence of Cape Verde (PAICV), led by Prime Minister Jose Maria Neves, which won 38 of the 72 seats in the National Assembly.

== Results ==
Although technical problems prevented a prompt announcement of official results, it quickly became clear that PAICV had won a parliamentary majority, and Veiga conceded defeat on 7 February 2011. The opposition's immediate acceptance of defeat, prior to an official announcement, was viewed as a sign of the strength of democracy in Cape Verde.

Party	Votes	%	Seats	+/–
African Party for the Independence of Cape Verde	117,967	52.68	38	–3
Movement for Democracy	94,674	42.27	32	+3
Democratic and Independent Cape Verdean Union	9,842	4.39	2	0
Labour and Solidarity Party	1,040	0.46	0	New
Social Democratic Party	429	0.19	0	0
Total	223,952	100.00	72	0
Valid votes	223,952	98.68		
Invalid votes	1,742	0.77		
Blank votes	1,248	0.55		
Total votes	226,942	100.00		
Registered voters/turnout	298,567	76.01		

=== By constituency ===
Constituency	Seats	Distribution
Santo Antão	6	PAICV 3, MpD 3
São Vicente	11	PAICV 5, MpD 4, UCID 2
São Nicolau	2	MpD 1, PAICV 1
Sal	3	MpD 2, PAICV 1
Boa Vista	2	PAICV 1, MpD 1
Maio	2	MpD 1, PAICV 1
Santiago North	14	PAICV 8, MpD 6
Santiago South	19	PAICV 11, MpD 8
Fogo	5	PAICV 3, MpD 2
Brava	2	PAICV 1, MpD 1
Africa	2	PAICV 1, MpD 1
Europe	2	PAICV 1, MpD 1
Americas	2	PAICV 1, MpD 1
