= 2001 electoral calendar =

National and federal elections held in 2001

This electoral calendar for the year 2001 lists the national/federal direct elections to be held in that year in both the de jure and de facto sovereign states. By-elections are excluded, though national referendums are included.

== January ==
- 14 January:
  - Portugal, President
  - Cape Verde, Parliament
  - Ivory Coast, Parliament (26 seats had postponed declarations)

== February ==
- 6 February: Israel, Prime Minister
- 11 February: Cape Verde, President

== March ==
- 2 March: Samoa, Legislative Assembly
- 4 March:
  - Andorra, Parliament
  - Elections in Benin, President
- 12 March: Elections in Uganda, President

== April ==
- 29 April: Senegal, Parliament

== May ==
- 13 May: Italy, Parliament
- 20 May: Chad, President

== June ==
- 7 June: United Kingdom, Parliament
- 7 June: United Kingdom, Local
- 24 June: Albania, Parliament (first round)
- 26 June: Uganda, Parliament

== July ==
- 8 July: Albania, Parliament (second round)
- 29 July: São Tomé and Príncipe, President

== August ==
- 31 August to 2 September: Seychelles, President

== September ==
- 9-10 September: Norway, Parliament
- 23 September: Poland, Parliament

== October ==
- 14 October: Argentina, Parliament
- 18 October: The Gambia, President
- 19 and 26 October: Mauritania, Parliament

== November ==
- 20 November: Denmark, Parliament
- 25 November: Honduras, President and Parliament

== December ==
- Chile: Parliament (16 December)
- Madagascar: President (16 December)
- Gabon: Parliament (9 and 23 December)
- Zambia: President and Parliament (27 December)
