= 2021 Cape Verdean parliamentary election =

- 18 April 2021

All 72 seats in the National Assembly 37 seats needed for a majority
- Registered: 392,951
- Turnout: 57.41%
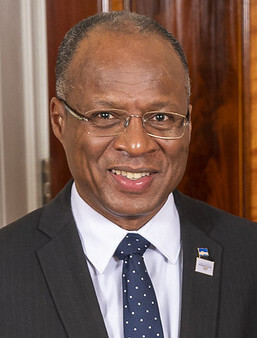

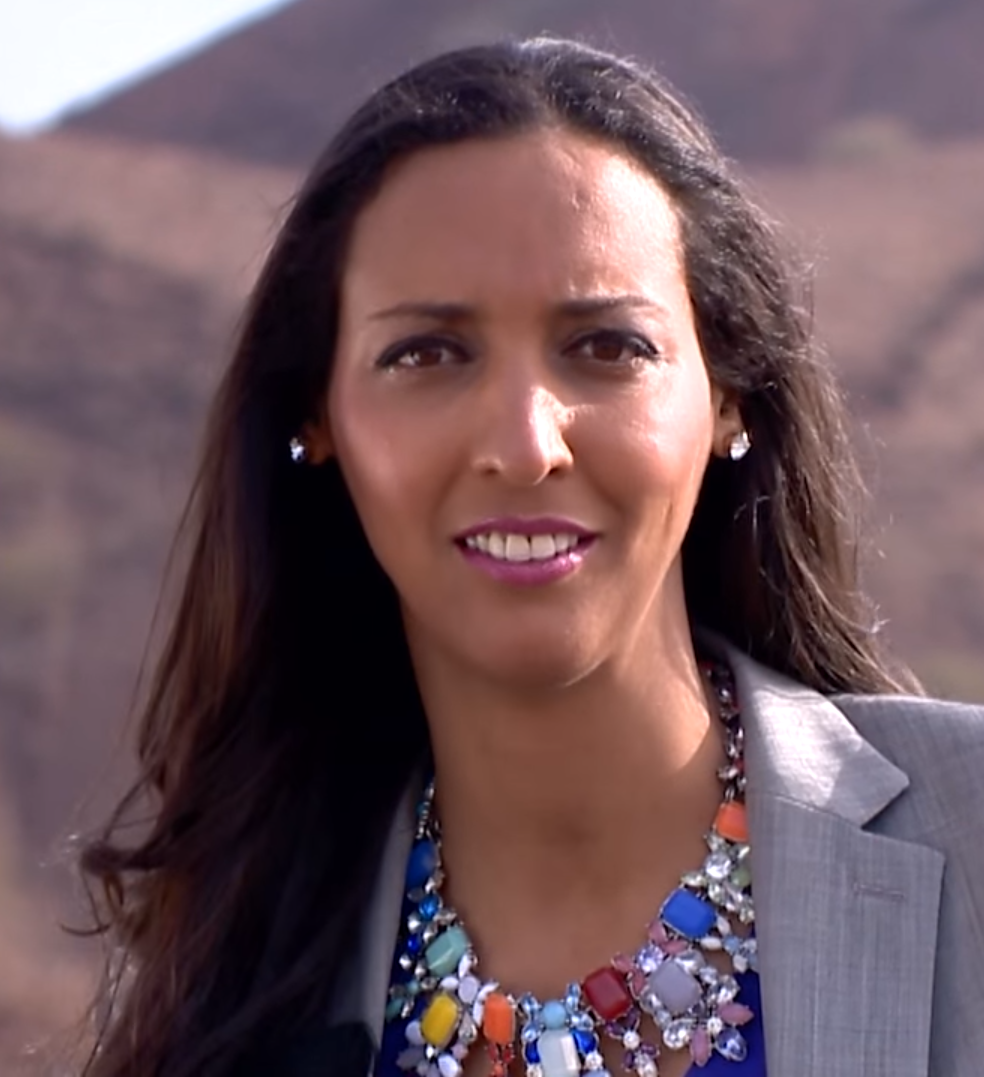

	First party	Second party	Third party
Leader	Ulisses Correia e Silva	Janira Hopffer Almada	António Delgado Monteiro
Party	MpD	PAICV	UCID
Leader's seat	Santiago Sul	Santiago Sul	São Vicente
Seats before	40	29	3
Seats won	38	30	4
Seat change	▼2	▲1	▲1
Popular vote	110,211	87,151	19,796
Percentage	50.04%	39.57%	8.99%
Swing	▼5.68pp	▼0.44pp	▲1.93pp
Prime Minister before election
Ulisses Correia e Silva
Movement for Democracy
Elected Prime Minister
Ulisses Correia e Silva
Movement for Democracy

Parliamentary elections were held in Cape Verde on 18 April 2021.

== Background ==
The incumbent prime minister, Ulisses Correia e Silva of the Christian democratic Movement for Democracy (MpD) party, sought reelection after five years of government. His main contender was Janira Hopffer Almada, of the moderate socialist African Party for the Independence of Cape Verde (PAICV), who would become the first woman to reach the office of Prime Minister if elected.

The two parties have been the dominant political forces in Cape Verde since its democratization, but several newer parties are taking part in the election.

== Name PM ==
Party	Name
MpD	Ulisses Correia e Silva
PAICV	Janira Hopffer Almada
UCID	António Monteiro
PTS	Claudio Sousa
PP	Amândio Barbosa Vicente
PSD	João Além

== Electoral system ==
The 72 members of the National Assembly are elected from 13 multi-member constituencies ranging in size from 2 to 19 seats. Three of the 13 multi-member constituencies are for diaspora voters in Africa, the Americas and Europe, Asia & Australia. The elections are held using closed list proportional representation, with seats allocated using the d'Hondt method.

== Results ==
Party	Votes	%	Seats	+/–
Movement for Democracy	110,211	50.04	38	−2
African Party for the Independence of Cape Verde	87,151	39.57	30	+1
Democratic and Independent Cape Verdean Union	19,796	8.99	4	+1
Labour and Solidarity Party	2,065	0.94	0	0
People's Party	762	0.35	0	0
Social Democratic Party	273	0.12	0	0
Total	220,258	100.00	72	0
Valid votes	220,258	97.63		
Invalid votes	2,989	1.32		
Blank votes	2,353	1.04		
Total votes	225,600	100.00		
Registered voters/turnout	392,951	57.41		
