= 1991 Cape Verdean presidential election =

Election of António Monteiro

- 17 February 1991
- Registered: 159,534
- Turnout: 61.4%
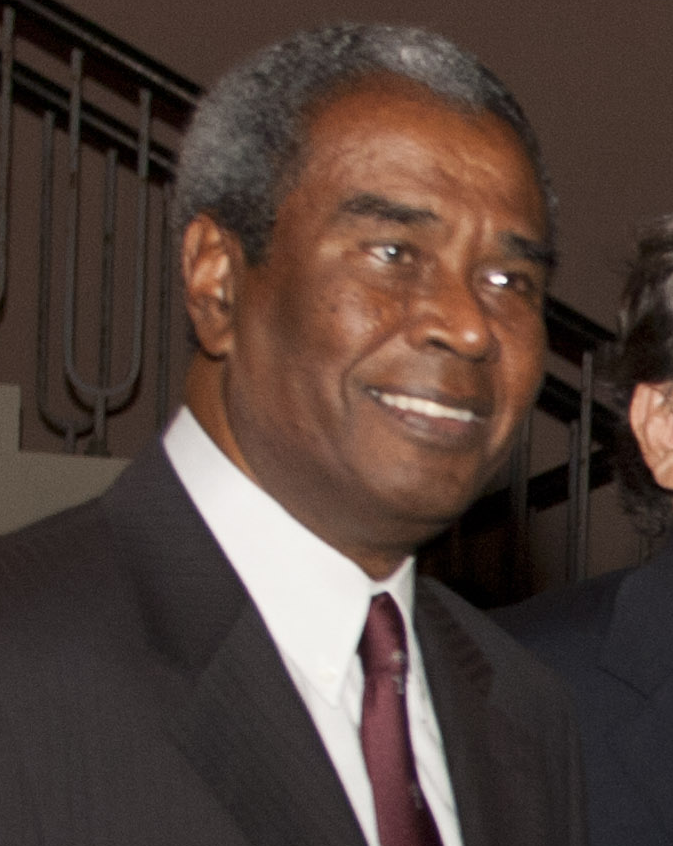

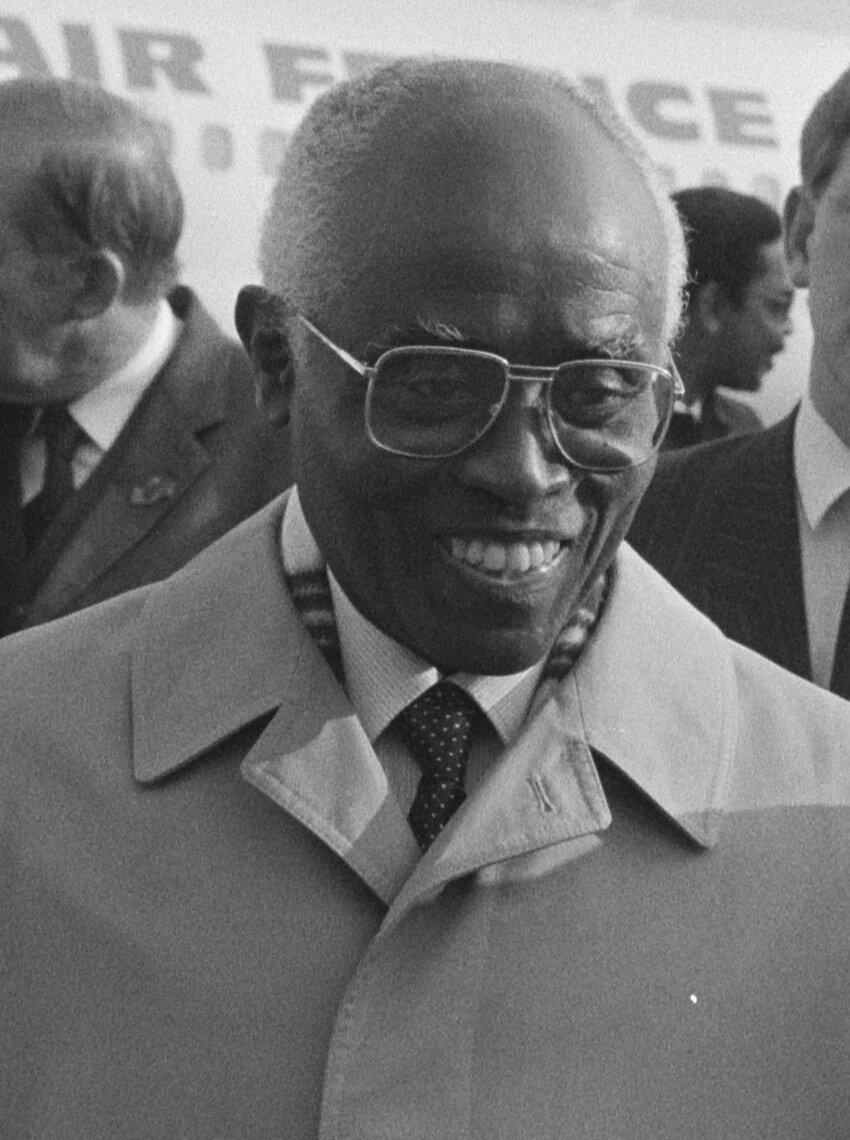
Nominee	António Monteiro	Aristides Pereira
Party	MpD	PAICV
Popular vote	70,623	25,544
Percentage	73.44%	26.56%
- Results by island
President before election
Aristides Pereira
PAICV
Elected President
António Monteiro
MpD

Direct presidential elections were held for the first time in Cape Verde on 17 February 1991, as previously the National Assembly had elected the President. The result was a victory for António Mascarenhas Monteiro of the Movement for Democracy, which had also won the parliamentary elections the previous month. He defeated incumbent Aristides Pereira of the African Party for the Independence of Cape Verde. Voter turnout was 61.4%.

Monteiro took office on 22 March.

== Results ==
Candidate	Party	Votes	%
António Mascarenhas Monteiro	Movement for Democracy	70,623	73.44
Aristides Pereira	African Party for the Independence of Cape Verde	25,544	26.56
Total		96,167	100.00
Valid votes		96,167	98.21
Invalid votes		1,422	1.45
Blank votes		333	0.34
Total votes		97,922	100.00
Registered voters/turnout		159,534	61.38
Source: Boletim Oficial
