= Gualberto do Rosário =

Former Prime Minister of Cape Verde

3rd Prime Minister of Cape Verde
- In office 29 July 2000 – 1 February 2001; Acting until 5 October 2000
- President: António Mascarenhas Monteiro
- Preceded by: Carlos Veiga
- Succeeded by: José Maria Neves

Personal details
- Born: António Gualberto do Rosário; 12 October 1950 (age 75) Mindelo, Overseas Province of Cabo Verde, Portugal
- Party: Movement for Democracy
- Education: University of Lisbon

António Gualberto do Rosário (Portuguese pronunciation: [ɡwalˈbɛɾtu du ʁuˈzaɾiu]) (born October 12, 1950) was Prime Minister of Cape Verde from 29 July 2000 to 1 February 2001. He was also the acting prime minister from July to October 2000 and Leader of the Movement for Democracy.

== Political career ==
From 1991 to 1993, do Rosário was the Minister of Fisheries, Agriculture and Rural Animation for Cape Verde.

=== Prime minister ===
On May 11, 1998, do Rosário was selected as Cape Verde's first deputy prime minister. At the time of his appointment, do Rosário was the Minister of Economic Coordination. He held the portfolio of Minister of Finance from 1997 to 1999. In July 2000, do Rosário was selected to become the chair for the Movement for Democracy party (MpD). After Veiga resigned on July 30, 2000, do Rosário was named as the next prime minister.

On February 11, 2001, the PACIV party won leadership in the parliamentary election. After the election, Do Rosário was replaced by the PACIV's party leader José Maria Neves as prime minister. Later that year, do Rosário stepped down from leading the MpD and was replaced by Filomena Delgado in August 2001.

=== Chamber of Tourism ===
In 2007, do Rosario was the president of the National Union of Tourist Operators (UNOTUR). In 2016, do Rosário was reelected as the President of the Chamber of Tourism.

=== Independent ===
In February 2008, he ran as an independent candidate for the Municipal Council of St. Vincent.

== Writing career ==
He had a taste of writing literature from his teenage years. He published different poems under different pseudonyms in the journal "Mar Alto" or Figueira da Foz, the Capeverdean review "Arte & Letra" (or Artiletra, and in all the published editions of "Folhas Verdes" ("Green Leaves") in which he was a founder. He wrote his first short story as a high school student with the title "Lume no Alto Selarino". In fiction, he wrote "Hora Minguada" in 2002 and a second one in 2004 titled "Ilha Imaculada" ("Immaculate Island"). He also wrote "A Herança da Chaxiraxi", his third fiction.

Preceded by Carlos Veiga	Prime Minister of Cape Verde; 2000–2001	Succeeded by José Maria Neves
