= Democratic Alliance for Change =

The Democratic Alliance for Change (Portuguese: Aliança Democrática para a Mudança, ADM) was a political alliance in Cape Verde in the early 2000s.

== History ==
The ADM was established in the buildup to the January 2001 parliamentary elections as an alliance of the Democratic and Independent Cape Verdean Union (UCID), the Democratic Convergence Party (PCD) and the Labour and Solidarity Party (PTS). The alliance received 6% of the vote, winning two seats in the National Assembly. In the presidential elections a month later, ADM candidate Jorge Carlos Fonseca finished third of the four candidates with 3% of the vote.

The parties contested the next elections in 2006 separately, with UCID winning two seats.
