= Partido Social Democrático =

Partido Social Democrático may refer to:

- Social Democratic Party (Brazil, 1945–65)
- Social Democratic Party (Brazil, 1987–2003)
- Social Democratic Party (Brazil, 2011)
- Social Democratic Party (Cape Verde)
