= Democratic Convergence Party (Cape Verde) =

Political party in Cape Verde

The Democratic Convergence Party (Portuguese: Partido da Convergência Democrática, PCD) was a political party in Cape Verde.

== History ==
The PCD was formed in 1994, following a split in the Movement for Democracy. In the 1995 parliamentary elections the party received 6.7% of the vote, winning a single seat in the 72-seat National Assembly.

In the buildup to the January 2001 parliamentary elections the party joined the Democratic Alliance for Change (ADM), a coalition including the Democratic and Independent Cape Verdean Union (UCID) and the Labour and Solidarity Party (PTS). The alliance received 6% of the vote, winning two seats in the National Assembly. In the presidential elections a month later, ADM candidate Jorge Carlos Fonseca finished third of the four candidates with 3% of the vote.

The alliance split prior to the 2006 parliamentary elections, which UCID and the PTS contested alone, while the PCD did not participate.
