= Democratic Convergence Party =

Democratic Convergence Party may refer to:

- Convergence Démocratique, Haiti
- Democratic Convergence (Chile)
- Democratic Convergence (El Salvador)
- Democratic Convergence (Peru)
- Democratic Convergence of Catalonia, Spain
- Democratic Convergence Party (Cape Verde)
- Democratic Convergence Party (Guinea-Bissau)
- Democratic Convergence Party (São Tomé and Príncipe)
