= 1995 Cape Verdean parliamentary election =

- 17 December 1995

All 72 seats in the National Assembly 37 seats needed for a majority
- Registered: 207,648
- Turnout: 76.52%
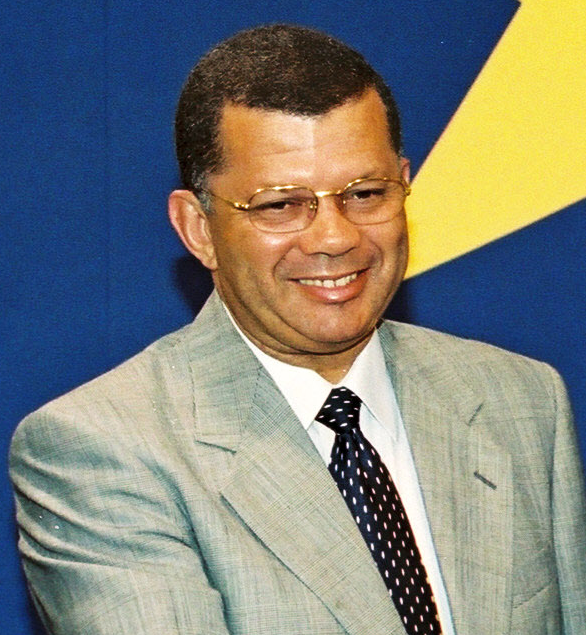

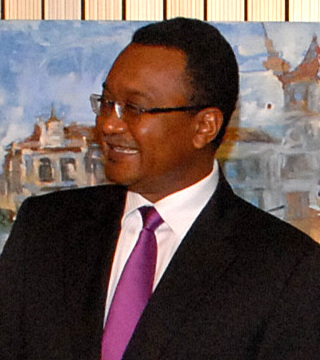
	First party	Second party	Third party
Leader	Carlos Veiga	Aristides Lima	Eurico Monteiro
Party	MpD	PAICV	PCD
Leader's seat	Praia	Boa Vista	Praia
Seats won	50	21	1
Seat change	▼6	▼2	New
Popular vote	93,249	45,263	10,211
Percentage	61.30%	29.75%	6.71%
Prime Minister before election
Carlos Veiga
MpD
Elected Prime Minister
Carlos Veiga
MpD

Parliamentary elections were held in Cape Verde on 17 December 1995. The number of seats was reduced from 79 to 72. The result was a victory for the ruling Movement for Democracy, which won 50 of the 72 seats. Voter turnout was 76.52%.

== Results ==
Party	Votes	%	Seats	+/–
Movement for Democracy	93,249	61.30	50	–6
African Party for the Independence of Cape Verde	45,263	29.75	21	–2
Democratic Convergence Party	10,211	6.71	1	New
Democratic and Independent Cape Verdean Union	2,369	1.56	0	New
Social Democratic Party	1,030	0.68	0	New
Total	152,122	100.00	72	–7
Valid votes	152,122	95.73		
Invalid votes	5,474	3.44		
Blank votes	1,305	0.82		
Total votes	158,901	100.00		
Registered voters/turnout	207,648	76.52		
