= Democratic Renewal Party (Cape Verde) =

Political party in Cape Verde

Democratic Renewal Party (PRD)
- Abbreviation: PRD
- Founder: Jacinto Santos
- Founded: December 7, 2000; 25 years ago (registration)
- Headquarters: Praia
- Ideology: Liberalism
- Political position: Centre-right
- National Assembly: 0 / 72

The Democratic Renewal Party (Portuguese: Partido da Renovação Democrática, PRD) is a political party in Cape Verde.

== History ==
The PRD was established in 2000 by Jacinto Santos, a former member of the Movement for Democracy, who had served as mayor of Praia. The party received 3.4% of the vote in the 2001 elections, but failed to win a seat in the National Assembly. Its vote share subsequently fell to 0.7% in the 2006 parliamentary elections.
