= Youth of PAICV =

The Youth of PAICV (Portuguese: Juventude do PAICV, abbreviateed JPAI), previously JAAC-CV, is a youth organization in Cape Verde, being the youth wing of the African Party for the Independence of Cape Verde (PAICV). The organization was the youth wing of the sole legal party, but in 1989 the organization removed mentions of democratic centralism from its statues and abdicated from its role as the vanguard role as the leading youth organization in the country.
