= 2016 Cape Verdean presidential election =

Re-election of Jorge Carlos Fonseca

- 2 October 2016
- Registered: 361,221
- Turnout: 35.47%
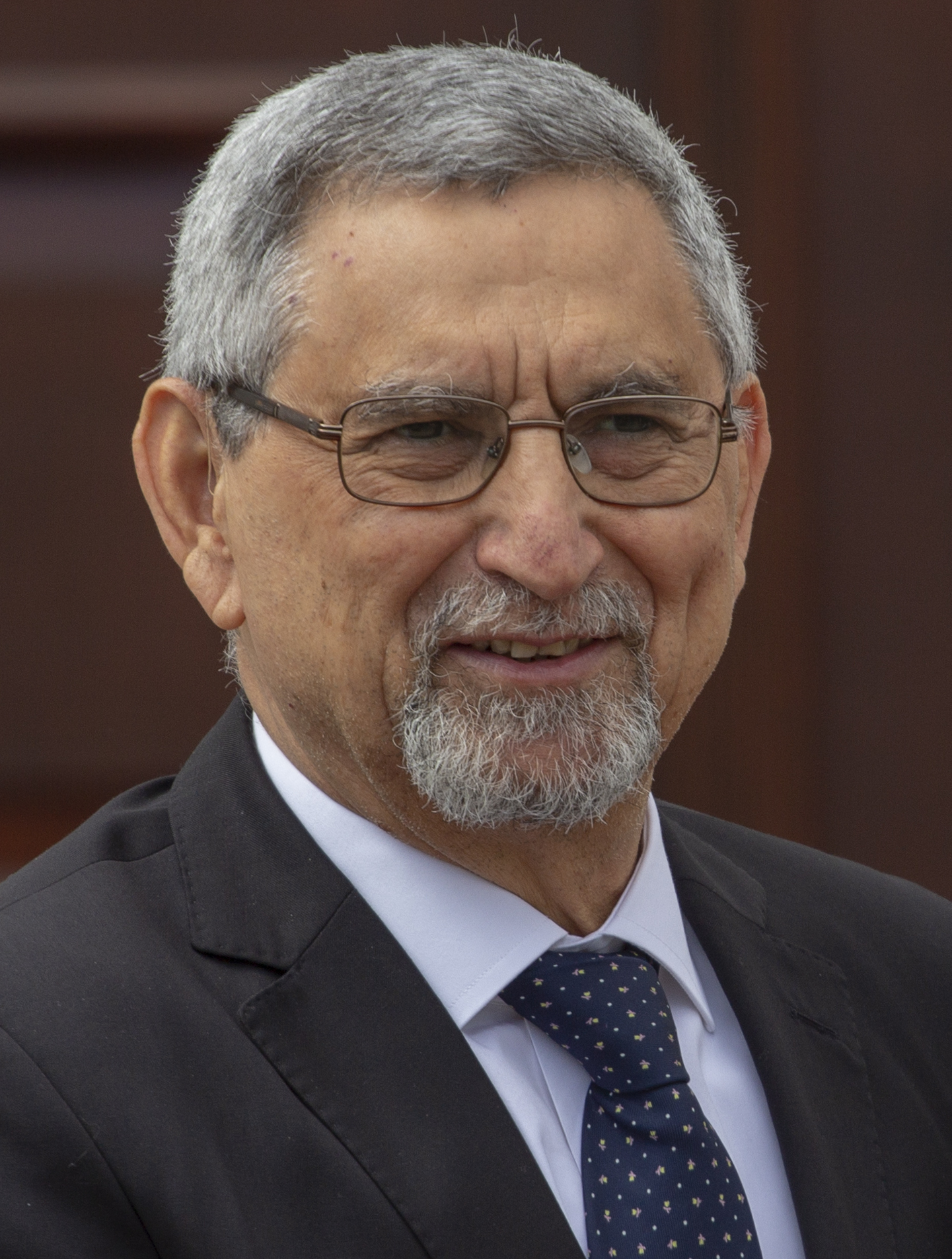

Nominee	Jorge Carlos Fonseca	Albertino Graça
Party	MpD	Independent
Popular vote	93,010	28,256
Percentage	74.08%	22.51%
- Results by constituency
President before election
Jorge Carlos Fonseca
MpD
Elected President
Jorge Carlos Fonseca
MpD

Presidential elections were held in Cape Verde on 2 October 2016. Incumbent President Jorge Carlos Fonseca of the Movement for Democracy (MpD) was re-elected with 74% of the vote.

== Electoral system ==
The President of Cape Verde is elected using the two-round system.

== Candidates ==
Jorge Carlos Fonseca was looking to secure his second term and was the favourite to win as the main opposition party the African Party for the Independence of Cape Verde (PAICV) failed to present a candidate after their disappointing loss in the parliamentary elections in March and municipal elections in September. Fonseca, representing the MpD, faced two independent candidates, Joaquim Monteiro and Albertino Graça.

== Campaign ==
Campaigning was temporarily suspended on 22 September following the death of the country's ex-president António Mascarenhas Monteiro. Monteiro was the country's first democratically elected president and was also a member of the MpD. All public events and rallies were suspended for 4 days until 26 September.

== Results ==
Candidate	Party	Votes	%
Jorge Carlos Fonseca	Movement for Democracy	93,010	74.09
Albertino Lopes da Graça	Independent	28,256	22.51
Joaquim Jaime Monteiro	Independent	4,278	3.41
Total		125,544	100.00
Valid votes		125,544	97.99
Invalid votes		1,088	0.85
Blank votes		1,485	1.16
Total votes		128,117	100.00
Registered voters/turnout		361,221	35.47
Source: Boletim Oficial

== Reactions ==
- African Union – The 29 member AU observer team headed by Manuel Serifo Nhamadjo cited the election as an exemplary example of a transparent election.
