= 2006 Cape Verdean parliamentary election =

- 22 January 2006

All 72 seats in the National Assembly of Cape Verde 37 seats needed for a majority
- Registered: 322,767
- Turnout: 54.17%
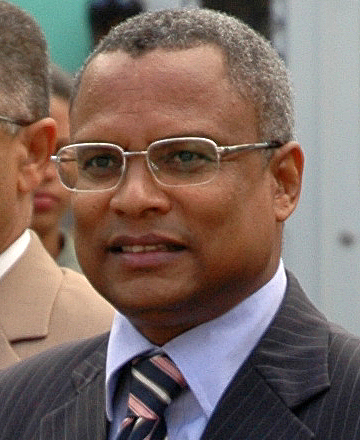

	First party	Second party	Third party
Leader	José Maria Neves	Agostinho Lopes	António Monteiro
Party	PAICV	MpD	UCID
Leader's seat	Praia	Praia	São Vicente
Seats won	41	29	2
Seat change	▲1	▼1	Steady
Popular vote	88,989	74,910	4,495
Percentage	52.30%	44.02%	2.64%
Prime Minister before election
José Maria Neves
PAICV
Elected Prime Minister
José Maria Neves
PAICV

Parliamentary elections were held in Cape Verde on 22 January 2006. The result was a victory for the ruling African Party for the Independence of Cape Verde (PAICV) run by José Maria Neves, which won 41 of the 72 seats in the National Assembly. Second was the Movement for Democracy (Mpd) and third was Democratic and Independent Cape Verdean Union (UCID) led by João Santos dos Luís.

== Campaign ==
The PAICV and the MpD (led by Ulisses Correia e Silva) were the only parties to nominate a candidate in every constituency.

== Results ==
Party	Votes	%	Seats	+/–
African Party for the Independence of Cape Verde	88,989	52.30	41	+1
Movement for Democracy	74,910	44.02	29	–1
Democratic and Independent Cape Verdean Union	4,495	2.64	2	–
Democratic Renewal Party	1,097	0.64	0	0
Social Democratic Party	672	0.39	0	0
Total	170,163	100.00	72	0
Valid votes	170,163	97.33		
Invalid votes	3,500	2.00		
Blank votes	1,167	0.67		
Total votes	174,830	100.00		
Registered voters/turnout	322,767	54.17		
