= Pedro Pires =

President of Cape Verde from 2001 to 2011

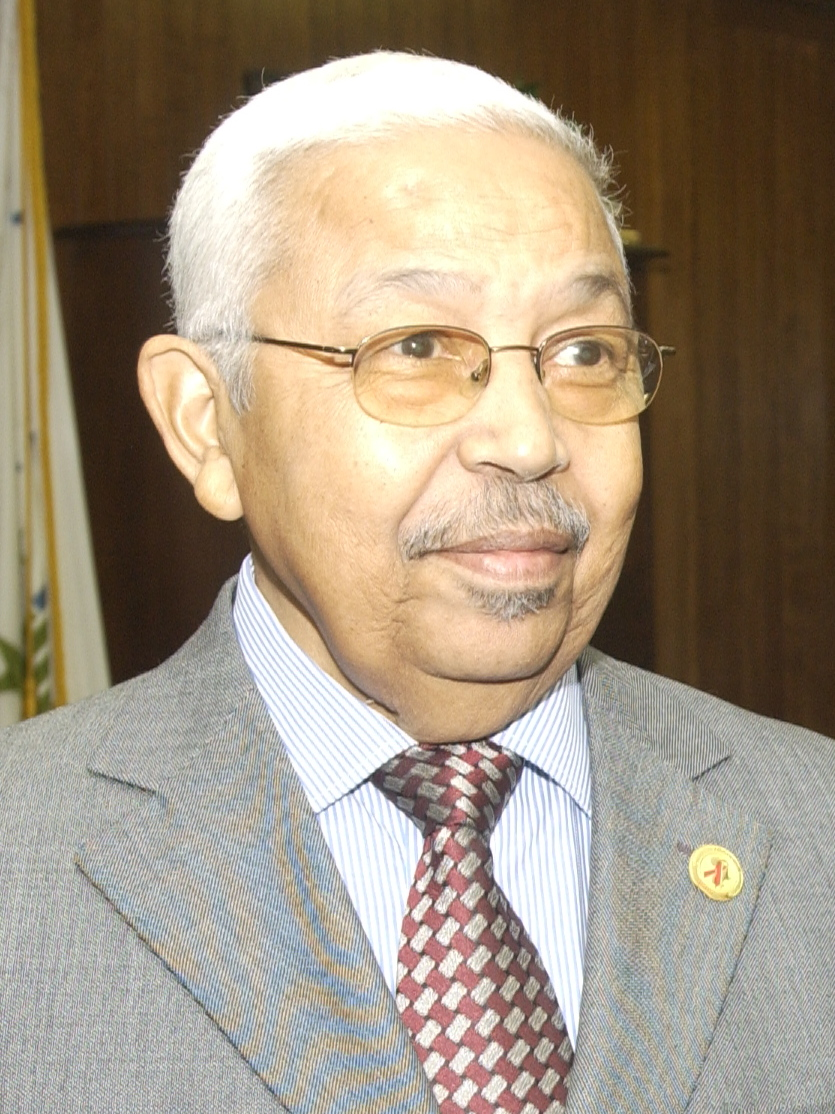
- Pires in 2005

3rd President of Cape Verde
- In office 22 March 2001 – 9 September 2011
- Prime Minister: José Maria Neves
- Preceded by: António Mascarenhas Monteiro
- Succeeded by: Jorge Carlos Fonseca

1st Prime Minister of Cape Verde
- In office 8 July 1975 – 4 April 1991
- President: Aristides Pereira; António Mascarenhas Monteiro
- Preceded by: Office established
- Succeeded by: Carlos Veiga

Personal details
- Born: Pedro Verona Rodrigues Pires; 29 April 1934 (age 92) São Filipe, Fogo, Portuguese Cape Verde
- Party: African Party for the Independence of Cape Verde
- Spouse: Adélcia Barreto
- Education: University of Lisbon

Pedro Verona Rodrigues Pires (Portuguese pronunciation: [ˈpedɾu vɨˈɾonɐ ʁuˈdɾiɡɨʃ ˈpiɾɨʃ]; born 29 April 1934) is a Cape Verdean politician who served as Prime Minister of Cape Verde from 1975 to 1991, and later as president from 2001 to 2011.

== Life and career ==
Pires was born in São Filipe, Fogo, Portuguese Cape Verde, to Luís Rodrigues Pires and wife Maria Fidalga Lopes. Later, he studied at Liceu Gil Eanes (Old High School) and Escola Jorge Barbosa in Mindelo during the 1950s and later abroad at the University of Lisbon in Portugal at the Faculty of Sciences. He fled to Conakry in 1962, then Ghana and afterwards headed to Algeria; he was trained in Cuba, the Soviet Union and Guinea-Bissau. He attended the Second PAIGC Congress in 1973. Before independence, he returned to Praia, Cape Verde on a Portuguese military ship on 13 October 1974.

=== Prime minister ===
Three days after the country became independent in 1975, he became the first prime minister of Cape Verde; the nation at the time was a one-party state under the rule of the African Party for the Independence of Cape Verde (PAICV). He opposed apartheid in South Africa and opposed foreign intervention in Africa. On 20–22 October 1980, he visited Paris. He visited that city again in 1989 and met with French prime minister Michel Rocard on 11 May 1989. He held additional portfolio of Minister of Finance from 1986 to 1990.

After the ruling PAICV decided to institute multiparty democracy in February 1990, Pires replaced President Aristides Pereira as General Secretary of PAICV in August 1990. The PAICV lost the multiparty parliamentary and presidential elections held in early 1991 and was left in opposition.

=== After being Prime Minister ===
At a party congress in August 1993, Pires was replaced as General Secretary by Aristides Lima and was instead elected as President of PAICV. As a candidate for the party presidency at PAICV's September 1997 congress, he faced José Maria Neves and prevailed with 68% of the vote. He stepped down as PAICV President in 2000 in preparation for a presidential bid in the next year's election and he was succeeded by Neves. He officially announced his candidacy for the Presidency of Cape Verde on 5 September 2000.

Pires was the PAICV candidate in the February 2001 presidential election, defeating former prime minister Carlos Veiga of the Movement for Democracy (MpD) in the second round by just 12 votes. Pires took office on 22 March; the MpD boycotted his inauguration, saying that the election was marred by a "non-transparent process". As president, Pires appointed Neves as prime minister.

=== As president ===
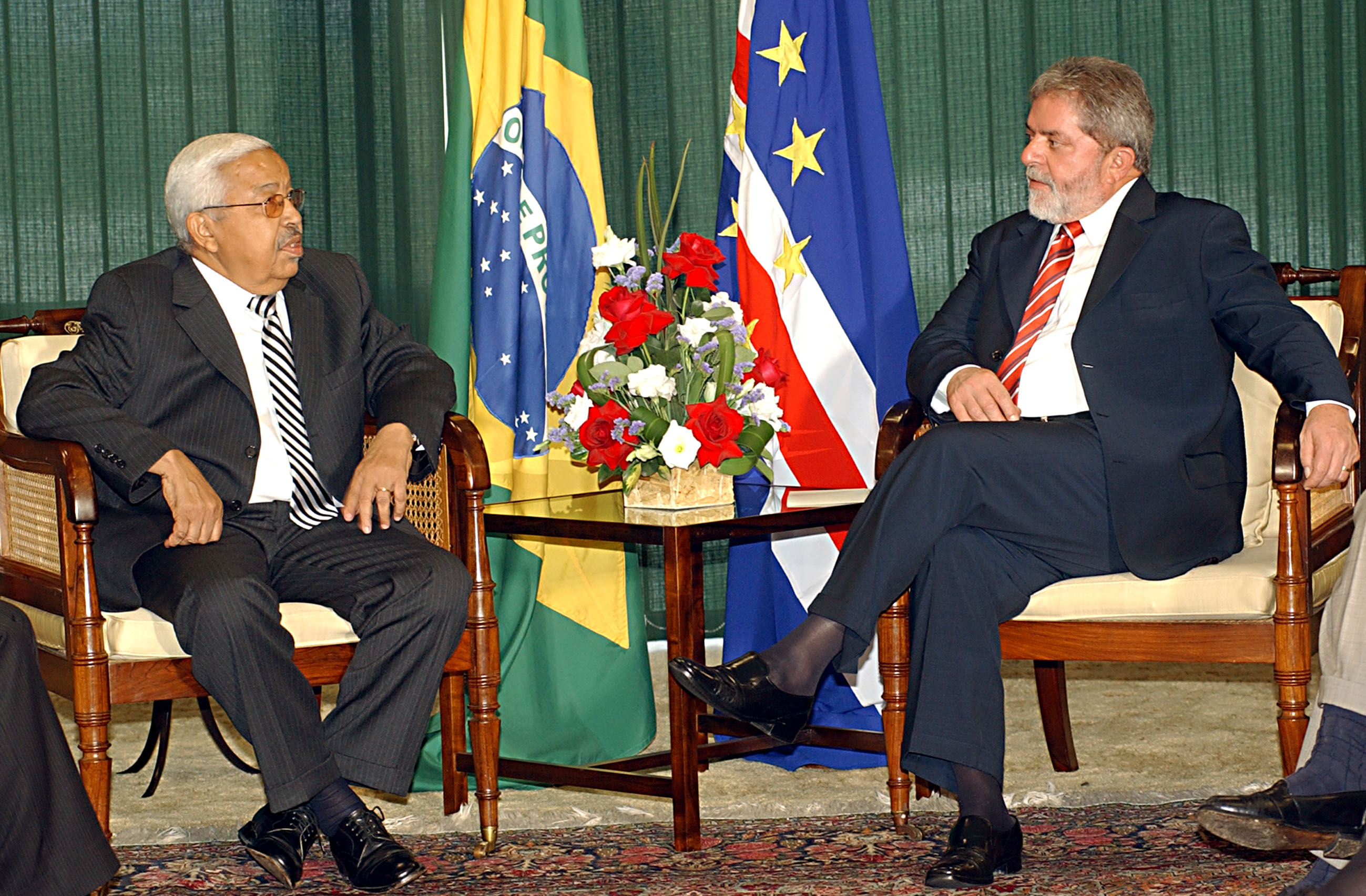
Pires with Brazilian president Lula da Silva, 4 October 2005

On 22 April 2002, Pires was received the Grand Cross of the Order of Prince Henry of Portugal.

On 7 June 2005, the president paid hommage to Sergio Frusoni and declared him one of the Greatest Crioulo poets.

Days later on 16 and 17 June, he met and talked with the French Minister of Cooperation Brigitte Girardin in Praia for discussions with the Europe Union for obtaining special status, fight against insecurity.

When he was president, in October 2005, he visited Brazil, the capital city Brasília and met the president at the time Luiz Inácio Lula da Silva.

Pires ran for a second term in the presidential election held on 12 February 2006 and again prevailed over Veiga, this time winning in the first round by a 51%-49% margin.

In May 2008, he said that he favored a cautious, long-term approach to the formation of a United States of Africa, preferring that regional integration precede a continent-wide union. He attended the Tokyo International Conference on African Development at this time. On 26 and 27 March 2009, he met with the foreign minister José Brito, the French Minister of Immigration (which includes Solidarity Development) Éric Besson on examining projects for solidarity development.

=== After presidency ===
Pires was awarded the 2011 Mo Ibrahim Prize for Achievement in African Leadership. The prize was awarded in recognition of Pires role in making Cape Verde a "model of democracy, stability and increased prosperity". The prize includes a monetary component of $5m.

== Personal life ==
He is married to Adélcia Barreto Pires, and has two children Sara and Indira.

== Awards and decorations ==
=== National ===
Cape Verde:

- Order of Amílcar Cabral

=== Foreign honours ===
Cuba:

- Order of José Martí

Gambia:

- Grand Commander of the Order of the Republic of The Gambia, 2008

Guinea-Bissau

- Amílcar Cabral Medal

Portugal:

- Grand Collar of the Order of Prince Henry, 2002
- Grand Cross of the Order of Christ, Portugal, 1986

Senegal:

- Grand Cross of the National Order of the Lion

Timor Leste:

- Grand Collar of the Order of East Timor, 2011

=== Others ===
- Doctor honoris causa, Lusophony University of Human Sciences, in the field of political sciences, 2011

Political offices
New office	Prime Minister of Cape Verde; 1975–1991	Succeeded by Carlos Veiga
Preceded by António Mascarenhas Monteiro	President of Cape Verde; 2001–2011	Succeeded by Jorge Carlos Fonseca
Awards and achievements
Preceded by Festus Mogae	Prize for Achievement in African Leadership; 2011	Succeeded by Hifikepunye Pohamba
