= 2016 Cape Verdean parliamentary election =

- 20 March 2016

72 seats in the National Assembly 37 seats needed for a majority
- Registered: 347,622
- Turnout: 65.97%
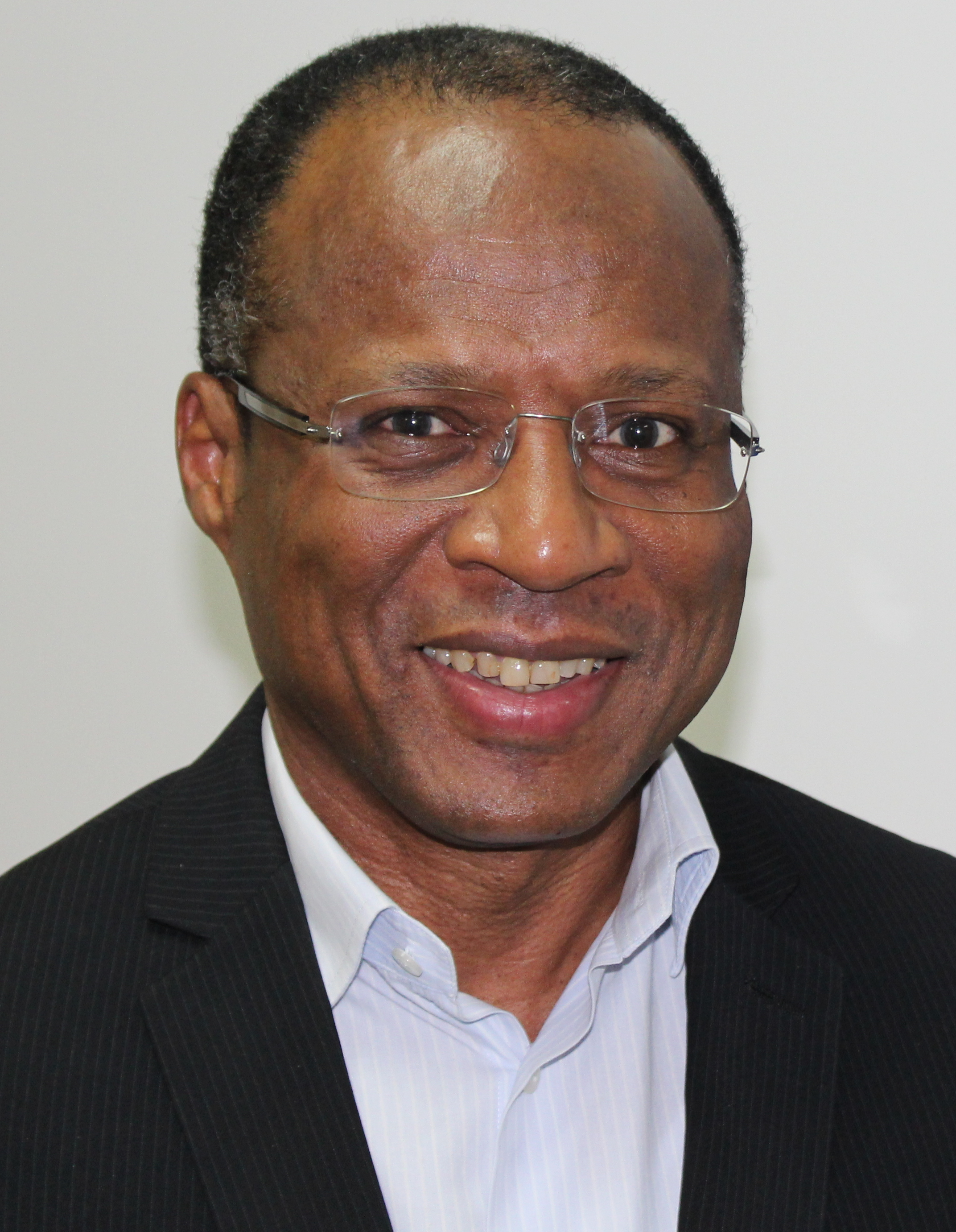

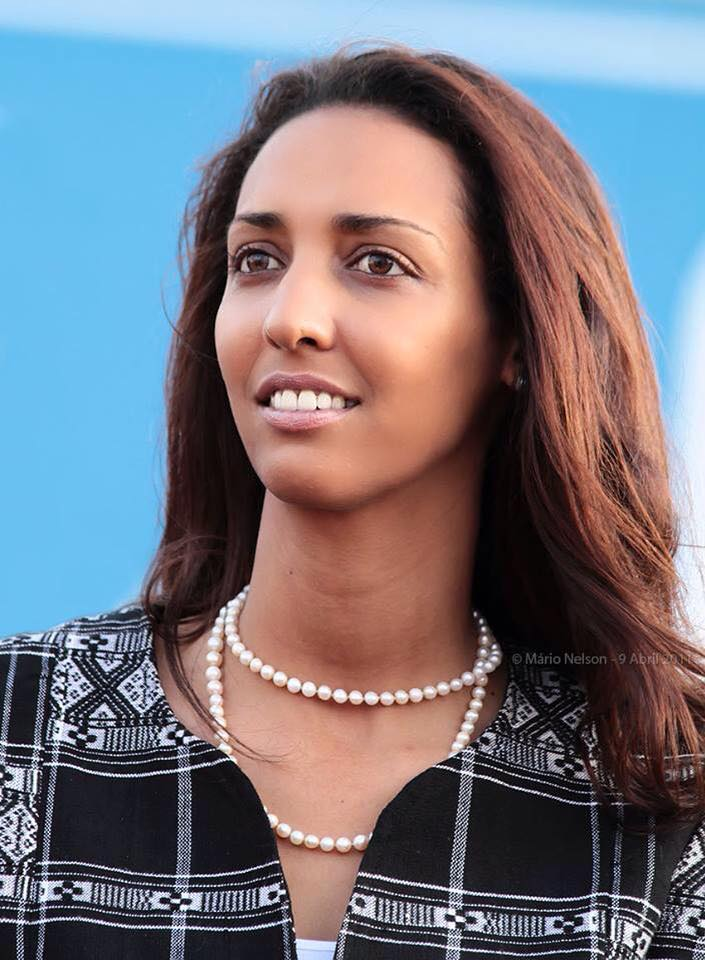

	First party	Second party	Third party
Leader	Ulisses Correia e Silva	Janira Hopffer Almada	António Delgado Monteiro
Party	MpD	PAICV	UCID
Leader's seat	Santiago Sul	Santiago Sul	São Vicente
Last election	32 seats	36 seats	2 seats
Seats won	40	29	3
Seat change	▲8	▼9	▲1
Popular vote	122,881	86,078	15,488
Percentage	54.48%	38.16%	6.87%
Prime Minister before election
José Maria Neves
PAICV
Elected Prime Minister
Ulisses Correia e Silva
Movement for Democracy

Parliamentary elections were held in Cape Verde on 20 March 2016. The ruling African Party for the Independence of Cape Verde (PAICV), led by Janira Hopffer Almada, was defeated by the Movement for Democracy (MpD), led by Ulisses Correia e Silva.

== Electoral system ==
The 72 members of the National Assembly are elected from 13 multi-member constituencies ranging in size from 2 to 18 seats. The elections are held using closed list proportional representation, with seats allocated using the d'Hondt method.

== Campaign ==
A total of 551 candidates ran for election, including 173 women.

== Results ==
Party	Votes	%	Seats	+/–
Movement for Democracy	122,881	54.48	40	+8
African Party for the Independence of Cape Verde	86,078	38.16	29	–9
Democratic and Independent Cape Verdean Union	15,488	6.87	3	+1
People's Party	777	0.34	0	New
Social Democratic Party	232	0.10	0	0
Labour and Solidarity Party	107	0.05	0	0
Total	225,563	100.00	72	0
Valid votes	225,563	98.35		
Invalid votes	1,925	0.84		
Blank votes	1,849	0.81		
Total votes	229,337	100.00		
Registered voters/turnout	347,622	65.97		

== List of elected MPs ==
Name	Party	Constituency
Adilson Silva Fernandes	MpD	Santo Antão
Clóvis Isildo Barbosa da Silva	PAICV	Brava
David Lima Gomes	MpD	Brava
Jorge Pedro Maurício dos Santos	MpD	Santo Antão
Arlindo Nascimento do Rosário	MpD	Santo Antão
Damião da Cruz Medina	MpD	Santo Antão
Calos Alberto Delgado	PAICV	Santo Antão
Vera Helena Pires Almeida da Cruz	PAICV	Santo Antão
Odailson Jorge da Luz Bandeira	PAICV	Santo Antão
João da Luz Gomes	MpD	São Vicente
Rui Alberto de Figueiredo Soares	MpD	São Vicente
Humberto Elísio Lélis Sousa Duarte	MpD	São Vicente
Maria Celeste Fonseca	MpD	São Vicente
Mircéia Isidora Araújo Delgado	MpD	São Vicente
António Delgado Monteiro	UCID	São Vicente
João dos Santos Luís	UCID	São Vicente
Dora Oriana Gomes Pires dos Reis	UCID	São Vicente
Manuel Inocêncio Sousa	PAICV	São Vicente
João do Carmo Brito Soares	PAICV	São Vicente
Filomena de Fátima Ribeiro Vieira Martins	PAICV	São Vicente
Nelson do Rosário Brito	MpD	São Nicolau
Américo Sabino Soares Nascimento	PAICV	São Nicolau
Francisco Marcelino Lopes Correia	MpD	Sal
Janine Tatiana Santos Lélis	MpD	Sal
Ana Paula Dias Santos	PAICV	Sal
José Luís Santos	MpD	Boa Vista
Walter Emanuel da Silva Évora	PAICV	Boa Vista
Joana Gomes Rosa Amado	MpD	Maio
Fernando Jorge Spencer Ferreira Frederico	PAICV	Maio
Austelino Tavares Correia	MpD	Santiago Norte
João Gomes Duarte	MpD	Santiago Norte
David Elias Mendes Gomes	MpD	Santiago Norte
José Manuel Soares Tavares	MpD	Santiago Norte
Anilda Ideida Monteiro Tavares	MpD	Santiago Norte
José Eduardo Mendes Moreno	MpD	Santiago Norte
Hélio de Jesus Pina Sanches	MpD	Santiago Norte
Celita Annie Alfama Pereira	MpD	Santiago Norte
José Maria Gomes da Veiga	PAICV	Santiago Norte
José Maria Fernandes da Veiga	PAICV	Santiago Norte
José Jorge Monteiro Silva	PAICV	Santiago Norte
Moisés António do Espírito Santo Tavares Borges	PAICV	Santiago Norte
João Baptista Correia Pereira	PAICV	Santiago Norte
José Manuel Sanches Tavares	PAICV	Santiago Norte
José Ulisses de Pina Correia e Silva	MpD	Santiago Sul
Fernando Elísio Leboucher Freire de Andrade	MpD	Santiago Sul
Filomena Mendes Gonçalves	MpD	Santiago Sul
Olavo Avelino Garcia Correia	MpD	Santiago Sul
Luís Filipe Lopes Tavares	MpD	Santiago Sul
José Luís do Livramento Monteiro Alves de Brito	MpD	Santiago Sul
Abraão Aníbal Fernandes Barbosa Vicente	MpD	Santiago Sul
José Filomeno Carvalho Dias Monteiro	MpD	Santiago Sul
Isa Filomena Pereira Soares da Costa	MpD	Santiago Sul
Alcides Monteiro de Pina	MpD	Santiago Sul
Lúcia Maria Mendes Gonçalves dos Passos	MpD	Santiago Sul
Janira Isabel Fonseca Hopffer Almada	PAICV	Santiago Sul
Felisberto Alves Vieira	PAICV	Santiago Sul
Rui Mendes Semedo	PAICV	Santiago Sul
Nilda Maria Gonçalves de Pina Fernandes	PAICV	Santiago Sul
Júlio Lopes Correia	PAICV	Santiago Sul
Ana Paula Elias Curado da Moeda	PAICV	Santiago Sul
Julião Correia Varela	PAICV	Santiago Sul
Jorge Arcanjo Livramento Nogueira	MpD	Fogo
Filipe Alves Gomes dos Santos	MpD	Fogo
Carlos Alberto Gonçalves Lopes	MpD	Fogo
Eva Verona Teixeira Andrade Ortet	PAICV	Fogo
Nuías Mendes Barbosa da Silva	PAICV	Fogo
Estevão Barros Rodrigues	PAICV	Africa
Orlando Pereira Dias	MpD	Africa
João de Brito Lopes de Pina	PAICV	Americas
Alberto Mendes Montrond	MpD	Americas
Francisco Correia Pereira	PAICV	Europe and rest of the world
Emanuel Alberto Duarte Barbosa	MpD	Europe and rest of the world
Source: CNE

== Reactions ==
- African Union: The African Union team of 20 observers declared that the elections held were fair and conducted in a peaceful and free manner. The AU also commended the government in creating the legal atmosphere for the press to conduct their business freely.
