= 1996 Cape Verdean presidential election =

Re-election of António M. Monteiro

- 18 February 1996
- Registered: 207,146
- Turnout: 43.79%
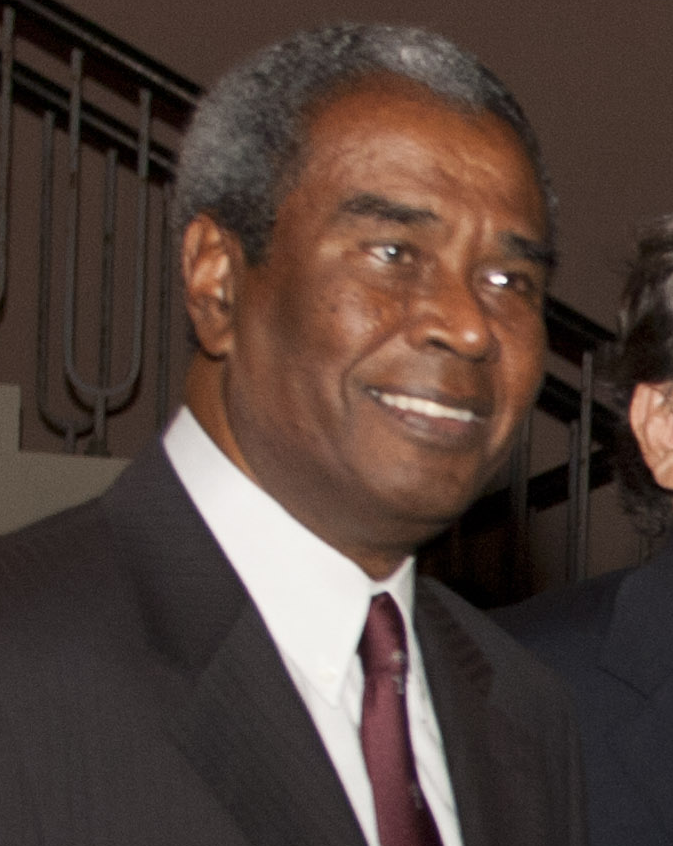
Nominee	António Mascarenhas Monteiro
Party	MpD
Popular vote	81,281
Percentage	92.06%
- Results by municipality
President before election
António Monteiro
MpD
Elected President
António Monteiro
MpD

Presidential elections were held in Cape Verde on 18 February 1996. Only one candidate, incumbent António Mascarenhas Monteiro of the Movement for Democracy, contested the election. He was re-elected with around 92.1% of the vote.

== Results ==
Candidate	Party	Votes	%
António Mascarenhas Monteiro	Movement for Democracy	81,281	92.06
Against		7,012	7.94
Total		88,293	100.00
Valid votes		88,293	97.91
Invalid votes		1,213	1.35
Blank votes		671	0.74
Total votes		90,177	100.00
Registered voters/turnout		207,146	43.53
Source: Boletim Oficial
