= 2001 Cape Verdean presidential election =

Election of Pedro Pires

- 11 February 2001 (first round); 25 February 2001 (second round)
- Registered: 260,209
- Turnout: 51.68% (first round); 58.95% (second round)
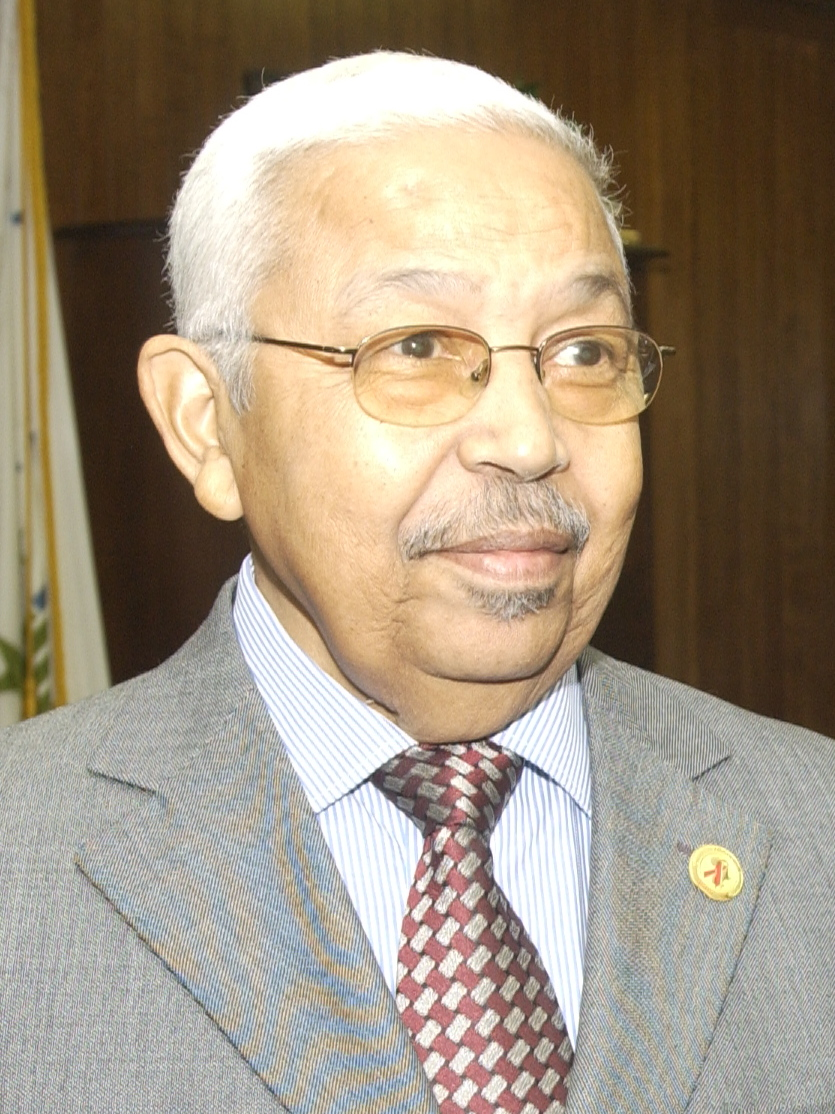

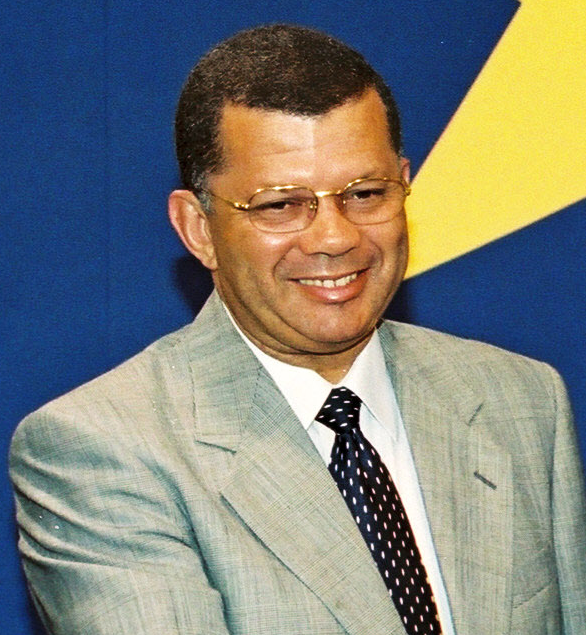
Nominee	Pedro Pires	Carlos Veiga
Party	PAICV	MpD
Popular vote	75,828	75,811
Percentage	50.01%	49.99%
President before election
António Mascarenhas Monteiro
PAICV
Elected President
Pedro Pires
PAICV

Presidential elections were held in Cape Verde on 11 February 2001, with a second round on 25 February after no candidate achieved outright victory in the first round. The result was a victory for Pedro Pires of the African Party for the Independence of Cape Verde, who defeated Carlos Veiga of the Movement for Democracy by just 17 votes. This makes it one of the closest elections results in history. Pires, a former Prime Minister, took office on 22 March 2001, replacing António Mascarenhas Monteiro, who stood down after completing two terms in office.

== Results ==
Candidate	Party	First round		Second round	
Candidate	Party	Votes	%	Votes	%
Pedro Pires	African Party for the Independence of Cape Verde	61,646	46.53	75,828	50.01
Carlos Veiga	Movement for Democracy	60,719	45.83	75,811	49.99
Jorge Carlos Fonseca	Democratic Alliance for Change	5,142	3.88		
David Hopffer Almada	Independent	4,989	3.77		
Total		132,496	100.00	151,639	100.00
Valid votes		132,496	98.51	151,639	98.85
Invalid votes		1,642	1.22	1,146	0.75
Blank votes		357	0.27	622	0.41
Total votes		134,495	100.00	153,407	100.00
Registered voters/turnout		260,221	51.68	260,209	58.96
Source: Boletim Oficial
