= 2001 Cape Verdean parliamentary election =

- 14 January 2001

All 72 seats in the National Assembly of Cape Verde 37 seats needed for a majority
- Registered: 260,126
- Turnout: 54.53%
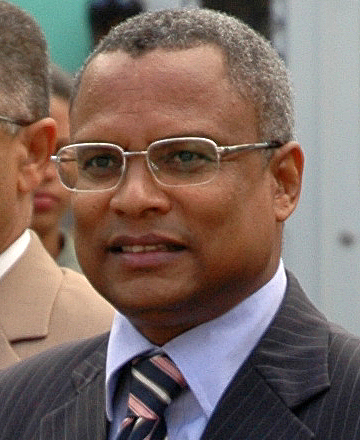

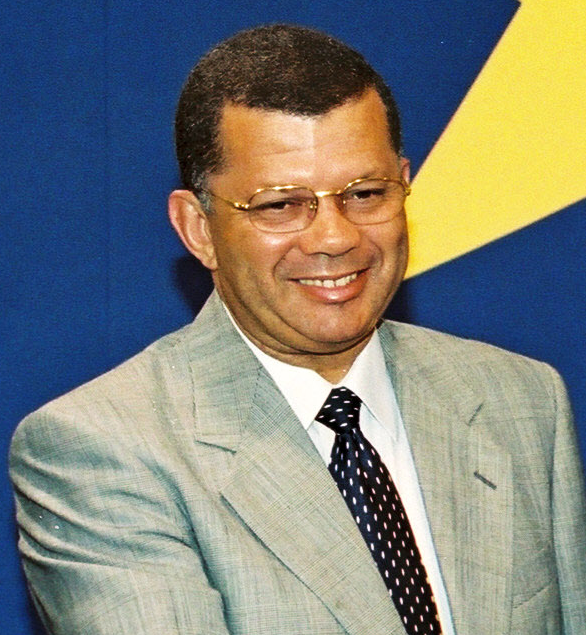

	First party	Second party	Third party
Leader	José Maria Neves	Carlos Veiga	Eurico Monteiro
Party	PAICV	MpD	ADM
Leader's seat	Praia	Did not run	Praia
Seats won	40	30	2
Seat change	▲19	▼20	▲1
Popular vote	67,860	55,586	8,389
Percentage	49.50%	40.55%	6.12%
Prime Minister before election
Gualberto do Rosário
MpD
Elected Prime Minister
José Maria Neves
PAICV

Parliamentary elections were held in Cape Verde on 14 January 2001. The result was a victory for the African Party for the Independence of Cape Verde run by José Maria Neves, which won 40 of the 72 seats in the National Assembly, defeating the ruling Movement for Democracy led by Carlos Veiga. Third was the Democratic Alliance for Change (ADM) led by José dos Santos Luís with 6.12% of the votes.

== Results ==
Party	Votes	%	Seats	+/–
African Party for the Independence of Cape Verde	67,860	49.50	40	+19
Movement for Democracy	55,586	40.55	30	–20
Democratic Alliance for Change	8,389	6.12	2	+1
Democratic Renewal Party	4,630	3.38	0	New
Social Democratic Party	620	0.45	0	0
Total	137,085	100.00	72	0
Valid votes	137,085	96.65		
Invalid votes	3,864	2.72		
Blank votes	887	0.63		
Total votes	141,836	100.00		
Registered voters/turnout	260,126	54.53		
