= António Mascarenhas Monteiro =

President of Cape Verde from 1991 to 2001

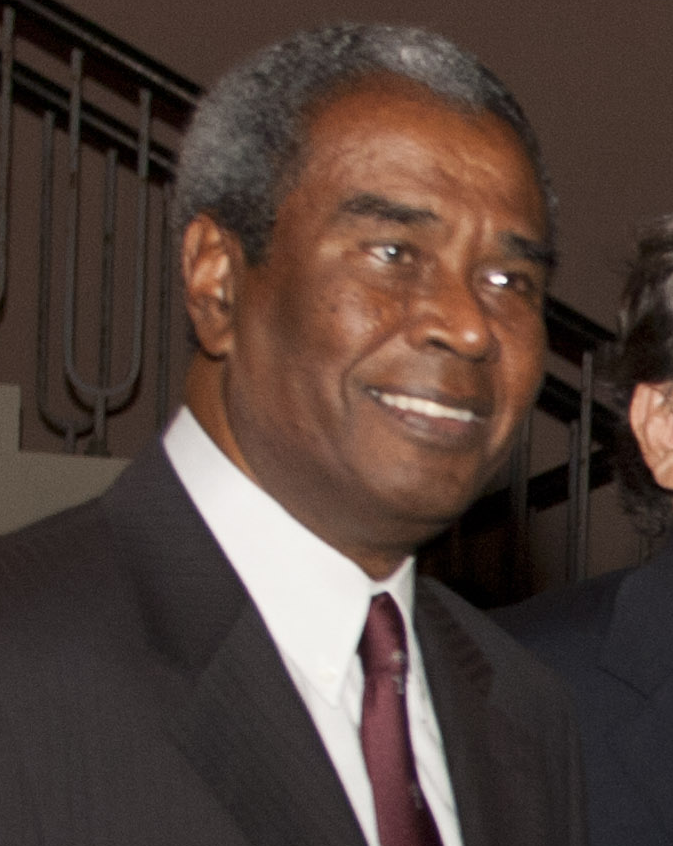
- António Mascarenhas Monteiro (2012)

2nd President of Cape Verde
- In office 22 March 1991 – 22 March 2001
- Prime Minister: Pedro Pires; Carlos Veiga; Gualberto do Rosario (acting); Jose Maria Neves
- Preceded by: Aristides Pereira
- Succeeded by: Pedro Pires

Personal details
- Born: António Manuel Mascarenhas Gomes Monteiro; 16 February 1944 Ribeira da Barca, Portuguese Overseas Province of Cabo Verde
- Died: 16 September 2016 (aged 72) Praia, Cabo Verde
- Spouse: Antonina Mascarenhas Monteiro (1966–2009; her death)
- Education: Catholic University of Leuven

António Manuel Mascarenhas Gomes Monteiro (Portuguese pronunciation: [ɐ̃ˈtɔniu mɐnuˈɛl mɐʃkɐˈɾeɲɐʒ ˈɡomɨʒ mõˈtejɾu]; 16 February 1944 – 16 September 2016) was the first democratically elected President of Cape Verde from 22 March 1991 to 22 March 2001.

== Early life and education ==
Born in Ribeira da Barca in 1944, Monteiro went to university in Belgium and graduated with his law degree from the Catholic University of Leuven.

== Political career ==
During the PAICV's single-party government, Monteiro served in various high level positions. He was the Secretary-General of the National Assembly from 1977 to 1980 and President of the Supreme Court of Justice from 1980 to 1990.

=== Presidency of Cape Verde ===
Supported by the Movement for Democracy (with which he had no affiliation), he was the first president elected in a multi-party election in the country, defeating Aristides Pereira in the February 1991 presidential election.

In February 1995, he awarded one of the archipelago's greatest writer during the colonial era Eugénio Tavares the Medal of the Ordem do Vulcão.

He was re-elected without opposition in 1996, receiving 80% of the vote. After serving two five year terms, he stepped down in 2001.

=== East Timor controversy ===
On 19 September 2006, it was announced that Monteiro would succeed Sukehiro Hasegawa as head of the United Nations mission in East Timor. The appointment was criticized in East Timor, partly because Monteiro had a poor knowledge of English. It was reported that Timorese president Xanana Gusmão was among those who expressed their concern about the appointment.

On 25 September, Monteiro announced that he had changed his mind and would not be accepting the position. He told journalists that "I told the Deputy Secretary-General that I already knew that there were reservations about my name on the part of parties engaged in East Timor and that I was no longer interested in serving there." He explained that "the functions of a representative of the UN Secretary-General in East Timor are very broad and must be exercised with the goodwill of all parties involved." Therefore, "it is better to stand down now than to create problems later on, especially in view of the complexity of the situation in East Timor."

== Memberships and awards ==
=== Honors ===
Year	Country	Order
1991	Portugal	Grand Collar Order of Liberty
	Senegal	Grand Cross, National Order of the Lion
	Cuba	Order of José Martí

=== Global Leadership Foundation ===
Monteiro was a Member of the Global Leadership Foundation, an organization which works to support democratic leadership, prevent and resolve conflict through mediation and promote good governance in the form of democratic institutions, open markets, human rights and the rule of law. It does so by making available, discreetly and in confidence, the experience of former leaders to today's national leaders. It is a not-for-profit organization composed of former heads of government, senior governmental and international organization officials who work closely with Heads of Government on governance-related issues of concern to them.

== Personal life ==
Monteiro's wife, Antonina Mascarenhas Monteiro, known widely as Tuna Mascarenhas, the former First Lady of Cape Verde, died in Praia on 9 September 2009, at the age of 65. He had three children.

Monteiro died on 16 September 2016 from kidney cancer and was buried in the cemetery in the city of Assomada on 18 September.

Preceded by Aristides Pereira	President of Cape Verde; 1991–2001	Succeeded by Pedro Pires
