= 1991 Cape Verdean parliamentary election =

- 13 January 1991

All 79 seats in the National Assembly 40 seats needed for a majority
- Registered: 166,818
- Turnout: 75.3%
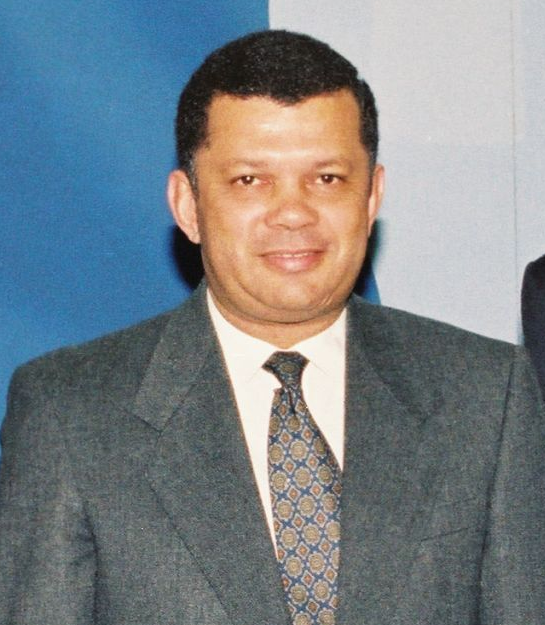

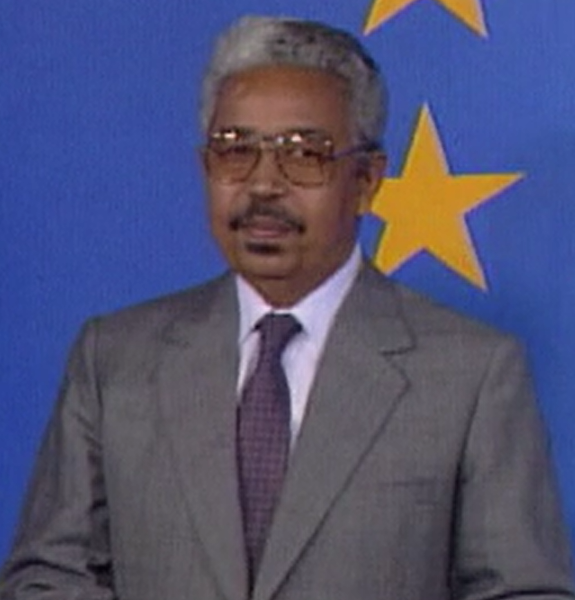
	First party	Second party
Leader	Carlos Veiga	Pedro Pires
Party	MpD	PAICV
Leader's seat	Praia Urbano	Praia Urbano
Seats won	56	23
Seat change	New	▼60
Popular vote	78,454	39,673
Percentage	66.41%	33.59%
Prime Minister before election
Pedro Pires
PAICV
Elected Prime Minister
Carlos Veiga
MpD

Parliamentary elections were held in Cape Verde on 13 January 1991, the country's first multi-party elections, having previously been a one-party state with the African Party for the Independence of Cape Verde (PAICV) as the sole legal party. The number of seats was reduced from 83 to 79. The result was a victory for the Movement for Democracy, which won 56 of the 79 seats. Voter turnout was 75.3%.

== Results ==
Party	Votes	%	Seats	+/–
Movement for Democracy	78,454	66.41	56	New
African Party for the Independence of Cape Verde	39,673	33.59	23	–60
Total	118,127	100.00	79	–4
Valid votes	118,127	94.08		
Invalid votes	6,764	5.39		
Blank votes	673	0.54		
Total votes	125,564	100.00		
Registered voters/turnout	166,818	75.27		
