= Ulisses Correia e Silva =

Prime Minister of Cape Verde from 2016 to 2026

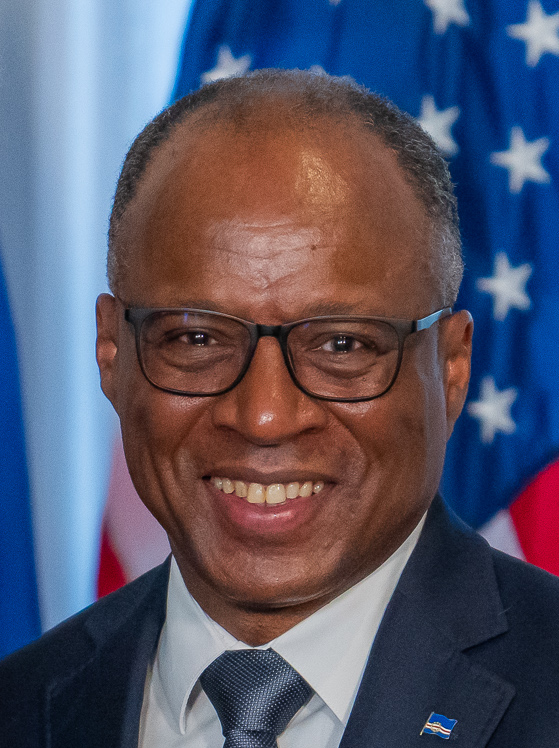
- Silva in 2024

5th Prime Minister of Cape Verde
- In office 22 April 2016 – 19 June 2026
- President: Jorge Carlos Fonseca; José Maria Neves
- Preceded by: José Maria Neves
- Succeeded by: Francisco Carvalho

Leader of Movement for Democracy
- In office 16 June 2013 – 20 September 2026
- Preceded by: Carlos Veiga
- Succeeded by: Paulo Veiga

Personal details
- Born: José Ulisses de Pina Correia e Silva; 4 June 1962 (age 64) Praia, Portuguese Cape Verde
- Party: Movement for Democracy
- Spouse: Elsa Correia E Silva
- Education: Technical University of Lisbon

José Ulisses de Pina Correia e Silva (Portuguese pronunciation: [ʒuˈzɛ uˈlisɨʒ dɨ ˈpinɐ kuˈʁejɐ i ˈsilvɐ]; born 4 June 1962) is a Cape Verdean businessman and politician who served as Prime Minister of Cape Verde from 2016 to 2026.

He took office after his party, the Movement for Democracy, won the 20 March 2016 parliamentary election.

== Early life and education ==
Silva was born in Praia, Cape Verde. He is the son of Virgílio Correia e Silva and his wife, Isolina de Pina. In 1988, Silva graduated from the School of Economics and Business Management at the Technical University of Lisbon.

== Early career ==
Silva started his career in the banking sector. He was the director of administration at the Bank of Cape Verde from 1989 to 1994. He also taught at the Jean Piaget University of Cape Verde.

== Political career ==
Silva served in the government of Cape Verde as Secretary of State for Finance from 1995 to 1998 and Minister of Finance from 1999 to 2001. Between 2006 and 2008, Silva was Vice-President of the Movement for Democracy (MpD) political party. In 2008, he was elected as the Mayor of Praia, and he was reelected as Mayor in 2013. Silva also became the President of the MpD in 2013.

Silva was also the executive president of UCCLA (the Union of Afro-Pan-American-Asiatic Lusophony Capital Cities) in 2013 and later became the president of IDC Africa in November 2014.

=== Prime minister ===
In June 2016, Silva and Finance Minister Olavo Correia met with representatives from the International Monetary Fund to discuss Cape Verde's economy. A few months later, in September 2016, Silva and members of his government met with the IMF to discuss the 2016 Article IV consultation.

Silva was reappointed to the leadership of the Movement for Democracy (MpD), with 99 percent of the votes cast, in February 2020. Thus, he is the candidate of the MpD to the 2021 legislatures, running for his own succession.

In the 2026 legislative elections, Silva's party lost to the African Party for the Independence of Cape Verde.

== See also ==
- List of current heads of state and government
- List of heads of the executive by approval rating

Political offices
Preceded by José Maria Neves	Prime Minister of Cape Verde; 2016–2026	Succeeded by Francisco Carvalho
