= Carlos Veiga =

Cape Verdean politician

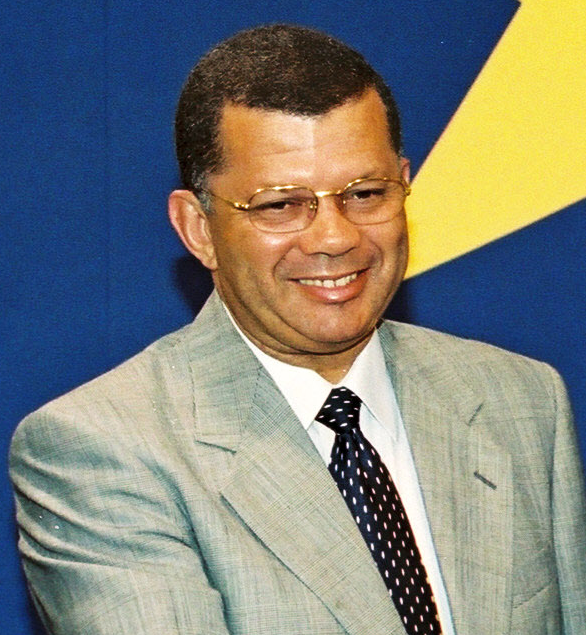
- Veiga in 1998

2nd Prime Minister of Cape Verde
- In office 4 April 1991 – 29 July 2000
- President: António Mascarenhas Monteiro
- Preceded by: Pedro Pires
- Succeeded by: Gualberto do Rosário

Personal details
- Born: Carlos Alberto Wahnon de Carvalho Veiga; 21 October 1949 (age 76) Mindelo, Cape Verde
- Party: Movement for Democracy (1990–present)
- Education: University of Lisbon

Carlos Alberto Wahnon de Carvalho Veiga (Portuguese pronunciation: [ˈkaɾluz alˈbɛɾtu waˈnõ dɨ kɐɾˈvaʎu ˈvejɡɐ]; born October 21, 1949, in Mindelo) is a Cape Verdean politician. He was Prime Minister of Cape Verde from April 4, 1991, to July 29, 2000.

Veiga ran for president for the Movement for Democracy (MpD) party in the 2001, 2006, and 2021 elections, losing all three times.

== Early life and education ==
Veiga was born in 1949 in Mindelo, São Vicente to Alfredo José de Carvalho Veiga and Maria Augusta Wahnon. He later attended school in Praia on the island of Santiago, and later, he graduated in 1971 from the University of Lisbon with a degree in law. Veiga's Jewish maternal grandfather immigrated to Cape Verde from Gibraltar in the 1840s. He is Cape Verde's first ambassador to Israel of Jewish descent.

== Career ==
After briefly living in Angola from 1972 to 1974, Veiga returned to Cape Verde in 1975, the year that it became independent, to join the African Party for the Independence of Guinea and Cape Verde (PAIGC). During his time in the PAIGC, Veiga served the Ministry of Public Administration from 1975 to 1980 as a judge. After leaving the African Party for the Independence of Cape Verde, he resumed his legal career and led the bar of Cape Verde from 1982 to 1986.

== Politics ==
In 1985, Veiga was elected to the National Assembly as an independent candidate. Later, in 1989, Veiga was selected to become the president for the Movement for Democracy Party. After the 1991 elections, the Prime Minister of Cape Verde, Pedro Pires stepped down and Veiga took his place.

Veiga served as prime minister under President António Mascarenhas Monteiro, and resigned in July 2000 in order to stand as the MpD's candidate in the 2001 presidential election. He was succeeded as prime minister by Gualberto do Rosário.

In the 2001 presidential election, Veiga lost by 12 votes to Pedro Pires of the African Party for the Independence of Cape Verde (PAICV) in the second round of voting. He ran again for president in the 2006 presidential election, but he was defeated again by Pires. He ran for president a third time in the 2021 presidential election, and lost to José Maria Neves in the first round.

Political offices
Preceded by Pedro Pires	Prime Minister of Cape Verde; 1991–2000	Succeeded by Gualberto do Rosário
