= Social Democratic Party (Cape Verde) =

Political party in Cape Verde

Social Democratic Party Partido Social Democrático
- Founded: 1992
- Split from: UCID
- Ideology: Centrism
- Political position: Center

The Social Democratic Party (Portuguese: Partido Social Democrático, PSD) is a political party in Cape Verde.

== History ==
The PSD was established by João Alem in 1992 as a split from the Democratic and Independent Cape Verdean Union (UCID). In the 1995 parliamentary elections it received only 1,030 votes (0.7%), failing to win a seat.

The 2001 elections saw the party receive just 620 votes (0.5%). Its vote share fell to 0.4% in the 2006 elections and 0.2% in the 2011 elections.
