= Jorge Carlos Fonseca =

President of Cape Verde from 2011 to 2021

Jorge Carlos Fonseca GCNSC
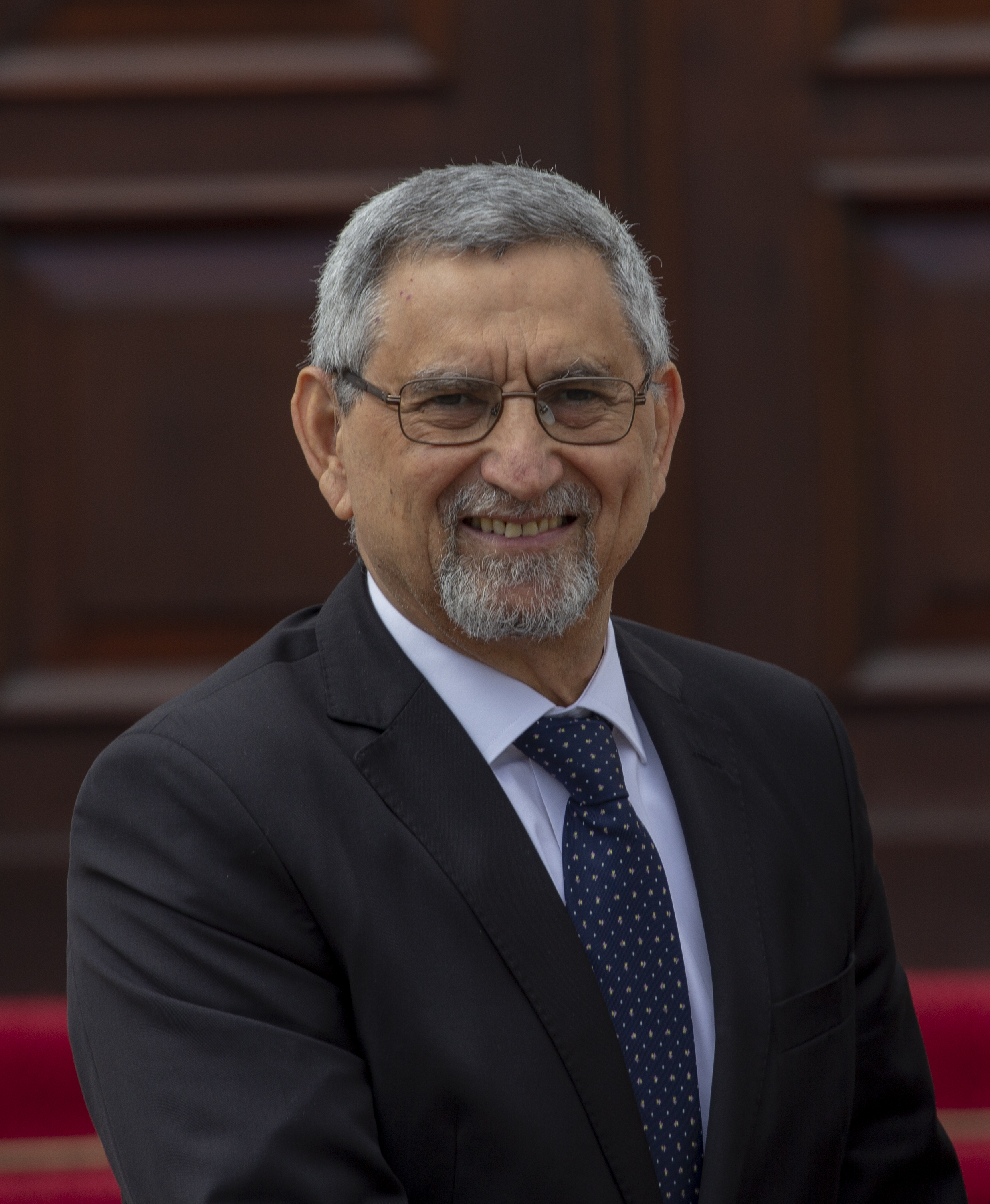
- Fonseca in 2019

4th President of Cape Verde
- In office 9 September 2011 – 9 November 2021
- Prime Minister: José Maria Neves; Ulisses Correia e Silva
- Preceded by: Pedro Pires
- Succeeded by: José Maria Neves

Personal details
- Born: Jorge Carlos de Almeida Fonseca; 20 October 1950 (age 75) Mindelo, Portuguese Cape Verde (now Cape Verde)
- Party: Movement for Democracy
- Other political affiliations: Democratic Convergence Party
- Spouse: Lígia Fonseca (m. 1989)
- Education: University of Lisbon (LLB, MLS)
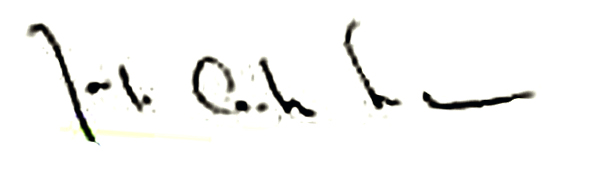
- Signature
- Website: Official website

Jorge Carlos de Almeida Fonseca GCNSC (Portuguese pronunciation: [ˈʒɔɾʒɨ ˈkaɾluʒ dɨ alˈmejdɐ fõˈsekɐ]; born 20 October 1950) is a Cape Verdean politician, lawyer and university professor who served as the President of Cape Verde from 2011 to 2021. He served as Minister of Foreign Affairs from 1991 to 1993. Supported by the Movement for Democracy (MpD), he won the 2011 presidential election in a second round of voting. Presidential elections were held in Cape Verde on 2 October 2016, where he was re-elected with 74.08% of the vote.

== Education and personal life ==
Jorge Fonseca was born in Mindelo, Cape Verde to Portuguese parents. Jorge Fonseca completed primary and secondary education between Praia and Mindelo, and later, his higher education in Lisbon, Portugal. He graduated in Law and a Master in Legal Sciences Faculty of Law, University of Lisbon. He married Lígia Arcângela Lubrino Dias Fonseca, the First Lady of Cape Verde, on 26 March 1989.

== Political and academic career ==
He was Director General of Emigration in Cape Verde from 1975 to 1977 and Secretary General of the Ministry of Foreign Affairs of Cape Verde from 1977 to 1979.

He was a graduate teaching assistant at the Faculty of Law, University of Lisbon between 1982 and 1990, invited Professor of Criminal Law at the Institute of Forensic Medicine of Lisbon in 1987 and a resident director and invited associate professor at the Law Course and Public Administration at the University of East Asia, Macau in 1989 and 1990. In 1991 and 1993, he was Minister of Foreign Affairs in the first government of the Second Republic; subsequently he stood unsuccessfully as a presidential candidate in the 2001 election. In August 2011, he again sought the presidency, this time backed by the MpD. He placed first in the first round, receiving 38% of the votes; in the second round, he faced the candidate backed by the African Party for the Independence of Cape Verde (PAICV), Manuel Inocêncio Sousa, and prevailed. He took office as President on 9 September 2011, becoming Cape Verde's fourth president since independence in 1975.

== Other activities ==
Fonseca was assistant professor and chairman of the board of the Institute for Law and Social Sciences in Cape Verde. He is also founder and Chairman of the Board of Directors of the “Direito e Justiça” Foundation, founder and director of the magazine “Direito e Cidadania”, collaborator to the magazine “Revista Portuguesa de Ciência Criminal”, and a member of the editorial board of “Revista de Economia e Direito” of the Universidade Autónoma de Lisboa. Fonseca has written several books and published over fifty scientific and technical works on law, and also two books of poetry. He has been awarded several times by the State of Cape Verde, is also holder of the status of Freedom Fighters of the Country.

== Honours ==
=== Foreign honours ===
- Luxembourg:
  - Knight of the Order of the Gold Lion of the House of Nassau (12 March 2015)
- Netherlands:
  - Knight Grand Cross of the Order of the Netherlands Lion (10 December 2018)
- Portugal:
  - Grand Collar of the Order of Camões (11 August 2021)
  - Grand Collar of the Order of Liberty (10 April 2017)
  - Grand Collar of the Order of Prince Henry (12 June 2012)

Political offices
Preceded by Pedro Pires	President of Cape Verde; 2011–2021	Succeeded by José Maria Neves
