= African Party for the Independence of Cape Verde =

Political party in Cape Verde

African Party for the Independence of Cape Verde Partido Africano da Independência de Cabo Verde
- Abbreviation: PAICV
- Leader: Francisco Carvalho
- Secretary: Julião Varela
- Founder: Aristides Pereira
- Founded: 20 January 1981; 45 years ago
- Split from: PAIGC
- Headquarters: Praia, Santiago Island, Cape Verde
- Youth wing: Juventude do PAICV (JPAI)
- Women's wing: Federação Nacional das Mulheres do PAICV (FNM–PAI)
- Membership (2021): ▲33,509
- Ideology: Democratic socialism; Social democracy
- Political position: Centre-left to left-wing
- International affiliation: Socialist International
- Colors: Red, green and yellow
- Seats in the National Assembly: 37 / 72 (51%)

Party flag

Website
- www.paicv.cv

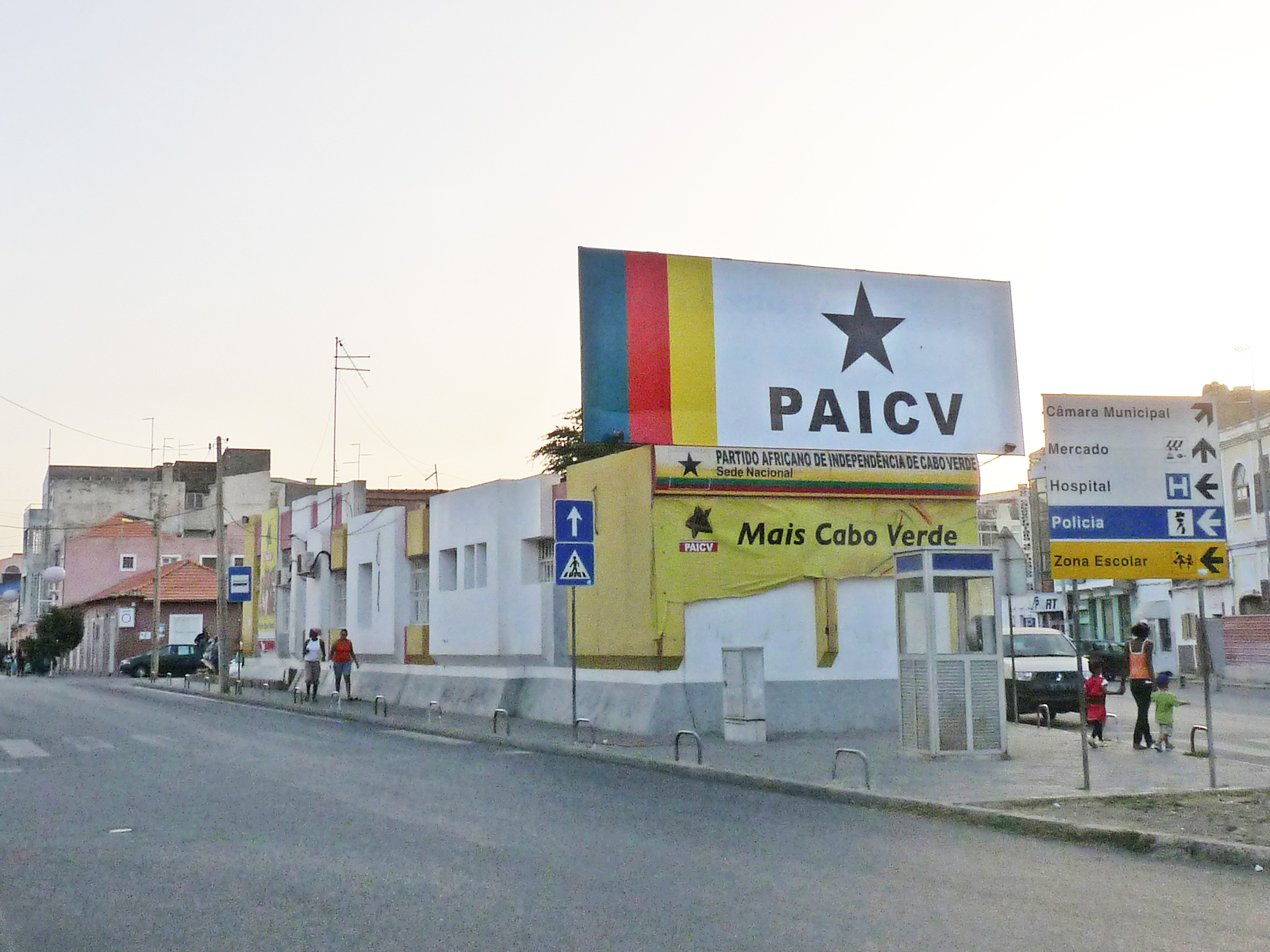
PAICV headquarters in Praia

The African Party for the Independence of Cape Verde (Portuguese: Partido Africano da Independência de Cabo Verde, PAICV) is a social democratic and democratic socialist political party in Cape Verde. It was the sole legal party in the country from 1981 to 1990. Its members are nicknamed "os tambarinas" (the tamarinds) in Portuguese, and they identify themselves with the color yellow. Their rivals are the centrist Movement for Democracy, or the wind fans, and the conservative Democratic and Independent Cape Verdean Union.

== History ==
In 1956, its forerunner, the African Party for the Independence of Guinea and Cape Verde (PAIGC), was founded by the Cape Verdean nationalist leader Amílcar Cabral (born in Guinea-Bissau). PAIGC fought to overthrow the Portuguese Empire, unify Cape Verde and Guinea-Bissau, and use its vanguardism to advance socialist revolution.

From 1961 on, the PAIGC fought a guerrilla warfare campaign in cooperation with its fraternal party umbrella group, the CONCP, during the Portuguese Colonial War. By 1973 the PAIGC controlled Guinea-Bissau, while Portugal's own Carnation Revolution in 1974 effectively dissolved the empire, relinquishing Cape Verde within the next year.

After the wars of national liberation, the PAIGC established a socialist state within both territories under Amilcar Cabral's brother, Luís Cabral.

=== Establishment ===
Following a military coup in Guinea-Bissau that ousted Cabral in November 1980, the Cape Verde portion of the party became the PAICV in January 1981; it was headed by the President of Cape Verde, Aristides Pereira. The PAICV was Cape Verde's sole legal party from 1981 until the abolition of the one-party state in 1990.

=== Multiparty democracy ===
At an extraordinary party congress in February 1990, the PAICV approved the introduction of multiparty democracy. Pereira stepped down as General Secretary of PAICV in July 1990, and Prime Minister Pedro Pires replaced him in August 1990. The PAICV won 23 of the 79 National Assembly seats in the January 1991 multiparty parliamentary election, losing to the Movement for Democracy (MpD). Pereira was subsequently defeated in the February 1991 presidential election, and PAICV again fared poorly in the December 1991 local elections. At a party congress in August 1993, Pires was replaced as General Secretary by Aristides Lima and was instead elected as President of PAICV.

The PAICV won 21 out of 72 National Assembly seats in the December 1995 parliamentary election. At a PAICV congress in September 1997, Pires faced José Maria Neves in a leadership contest, and Pires was elected with 68% of the vote. Pires stepped down as PAICV President in 2000 in preparation for a presidential bid in the next year's election and he was succeeded by Neves.

=== 2001 election ===
In the presidential election held on 11 and 25 February 2001, PAICV candidate Pedro Pires, who won 46.52% of the vote in the first round, narrowly defeated the MpD's Carlos Veiga by a margin of only 12 votes in the run-off.

=== 2006 election ===
In the parliamentary election held on 22 January 2006, PAICV won 52.28% of the popular vote and 41 out of 72 seats in the National Assembly.

In the presidential election held on 12 February 2006, Pedro Pires again narrowly defeated Carlos Veiga, winning 50.98% of the vote.

=== 2011 election ===
In the parliamentary election held on 7 February 2011, the PAICV led by Jose Maria Neves won 52.68% of the popular vote and 38 out of 72 seats in the National Assembly.

In the presidential election held on 7 and 21 August 2011, Manuel Inocêncio Sousa lost to Jorge Carlos Fonseca (MpD) with 32.66% of the votes in the first round and 45.74% in the second round.

=== 2016 election ===
PAICV lost 2016 presidential elections and president Jorge Carlos Fonseca was re-elected with very clear majority of the votes. PAICV even failed to forward a candidate. Before that PAICV had lost the 2016 parliamentary election. The main opposition party Movement for Democracy (MpD) won the parliamentary elections, taking back power after 15 years.

== Affiliation ==
The PAICV describes itself as democratic socialist but began to trend towards social democracy in the 2010s. The party has been placed as left-wing on the political spectrum.

The party is a full member of the Socialist International.

== Electoral history ==
=== Presidential elections ===
Election	Party candidate	Votes	%	Votes	%	Result
Election	Party candidate	First round		Second round		Result
1991	Aristides Pereira	25,544	26.56%	–	–	Lost ✗
1996	Did not participate					
2001	Pedro Pires	61,646	46.52%	75,827	50.00%	Elected ✓
2006	Pedro Pires	86,583	50.98%	–	–	Elected ✓
2011	Manuel Inocêncio Sousa	52,612	32.66%	82,379	45.74%	Lost ✗
2016	Did not participate					
2021	José Maria Neves	96,035	51.79%	–	–	Elected ✓

=== National Assembly elections ===
Election	Party leader	Votes	%	Seats	+/–	Position	Result
1975	Aristides Pereira	100,835	95.58%	56 / 56	▲56	▲1st	Sole legal party
1980	Aristides Pereira	141,244	92.60%	63 / 63	▲7	1st	Sole legal party
1985	Aristides Pereira	92,865	94.87%	83 / 83	▲20	1st	Sole legal party
1991	Pedro Pires	39,673	33.59%	23 / 79	▼60	▼2nd	Opposition
1995	Aristides Lima	45,263	29.75%	21 / 72	▼2	2nd	Opposition
2001	José Maria Neves	67,860	49.50%	40 / 72	▲19	▲1st	Majority government
2006	José Maria Neves	88,965	52.28%	41 / 72	▲1	1st	Majority government
2011	José Maria Neves	117,967	52.68%	38 / 72	▼3	1st	Majority government
2016	Janira Hopffer Almada	86,078	38.16%	29 / 72	▼9	▼2nd	Opposition
2021	Janira Hopffer Almada	87,063	38.57%	30 / 72	▲1	2nd	Opposition
2026	Francisco Carvalho	90,660	48.04%	37 / 72	▲7	1st	Majority government
