= Movement for Democracy (Cape Verde) =

Political party in Cape Verde

Movement for Democracy Movimento para a Democracia
- Leader: Paulo Veiga
- Founded: 14 March 1990
- Registered: 26 November 1990
- Headquarters: Praia, Santiago Island, Cape Verde
- Ideology: Liberalism; Christian democracy Civic nationalism Economic liberalism Social conservatism
- Political position: Centre to centre-right
- International affiliation: Centrist Democrat International
- National Assembly: 33 / 72

Website
- www.mpd.cv

The Movement for Democracy (Portuguese: Movimento para a Democracia, MpD) is a Christian democratic and liberal party in Cape Verde. Established in 1990, it was the ruling party from 1991 to 2001 and returned to power in the 2016 parliamentary election. Its members are nicknamed "os ventoinhas" (the wind fans) in Portuguese, a reference to the party's logo. The party is serving in the opposition since the 2026 election.

== History ==
The MpD was established on 14 March 1990 by Carlos Veiga after Prime Minister Pedro Pires of the African Party for the Independence of Cape Verde (PAICV, formerly the sole legal party) allowed its creation. The party was publicly launched in May 1990 and its first convention was held in November 1990.

In the January 1991 parliamentary elections, the first multi-party elections in the country's history, the MpD won 56 of the 79 seats in the National Assembly. In the presidential elections the following month, MpD candidate António Mascarenhas Monteiro defeated the incumbent PAICV President Aristides Pereira.

Following the MpD's second convention in January 1993, splits developed within the party, with two groups, List A and List B, emerging. A split in 1994 led to the creation of the Democratic Convergence Party. Despite losing six seats, the party retained its parliamentary majority in the 1995 elections, whilst Monteiro was re-elected unopposed in the presidential elections the following year.

The January 2001 parliamentary elections saw the party lose another 20 seats, as it was defeated by the PAICV. In the February 2001 presidential elections the MpD nominated Veiga, but he was defeated by the PAICV's Pires by just 12 votes in the second round of voting.

In the 2006 parliamentary elections party lost another seat and was reduced to 29 MPs. Veiga was again defeated by Pires in the presidential elections later in the year.

Despite gaining three seats in the 2011 parliamentary elections, the MpD remained in opposition. However, in the presidential elections in the same year, MpD candidate Jorge Carlos Fonseca defeated the PAICV's Manuel Inocêncio Sousa by 54–46%.

In July 2013, Ulisses Correia e Silva, the mayor of the capital, Praia, became party's new chairman, following Carlos Veiga, who stepped down after five years.

Fonseca was re-elected as president in the 2016 presidential election. The MpD also won a majority in the National Assembly during the 2016 parliamentary elections, ending fifteen years of PAICV majorities in that body and electing its leader Ulisses Correia e Silva as Prime Minister of Cape Verde.

== Youth wing ==
The party's youth wing is the Youth for Democracy (Portuguese: Juventude para a Democracia, JpD), which plays a role in political mobilization and engagement of younger members within the party.

Since 2025, the organization has been led by Líver Gomes.

== Electoral history ==
=== Presidential elections ===
Election	Party candidate	Votes	%	Votes	%	Result
Election	Party candidate	First Round		Second Round		Result
1991	António Mascarenhas Monteiro	70,623	73.4%	-	-	Elected ✓
1996	António Mascarenhas Monteiro	81,821	92.1%	-	-	Elected ✓
2001	Carlos Veiga	60,719	45.8%	75,815	50.0%	Lost ✗
2006	Carlos Veiga	83,241	49.0%	-	-	Lost ✗
2011	Jorge Carlos Fonseca	60,887	37.8%	97,735	54.3%	Elected ✓
2016	Jorge Carlos Fonseca	93,010	74.08%	-	-	Elected ✓
2021	Carlos Veiga	78,603	42.39%	-	-	Lost ✗
2026	Joana Rosa	TBD	TBD	-	-	TBD

=== National Assembly elections ===
Election	Party leader	Votes	%	Seats	+/–	Position	Result
1991	Carlos Veiga	78,454	66.41%	56 / 79	▲56	▲1st	Supermajority government
1995	Carlos Veiga	93,249	61.30%	50 / 72	▼6	1st	Supermajority government
2001	Gualberto do Rosário	55,586	40.55%	30 / 72	▼20	▼2nd	Opposition
2006	Agostinho Lopes	74,909	44.02%	29 / 72	▼1	2nd	Opposition
2011	Carlos Veiga	94,674	42.27%	32 / 72	▲3	2nd	Opposition
2016	Ulisses Correia e Silva	122,881	54.48%	40 / 72	▲8	▲1st	Majority government
2021	Ulisses Correia e Silva	110,121	50.02%	38 / 72	▼2	1st	Majority government
2026	Ulisses Correia e Silva	84,458	44.75%	33 / 72	▼5	▼2nd	Opposition
