= National Assembly (Cape Verde) =

Unicameral legislature of Cape Verde

Coordinates: 14.906083°N 23.515376°W

- 11th National Assembly

Type
- Type: Unicameral

History
- Founded: 4 July 1975

Leadership
- President: Janira Hopffer Almada, PAICV since 18 June 2026

Structure
- Seats: 72
- Political groups: Government (37): PAICV (37); Opposition (35): MpD (33); UCID (2)

Elections
- Voting system: Closed-list proportional representation using the D'Hondt method
- First election: 30 June 1975
- Last election: 17 May 2026
- Next election: 2031

Meeting place
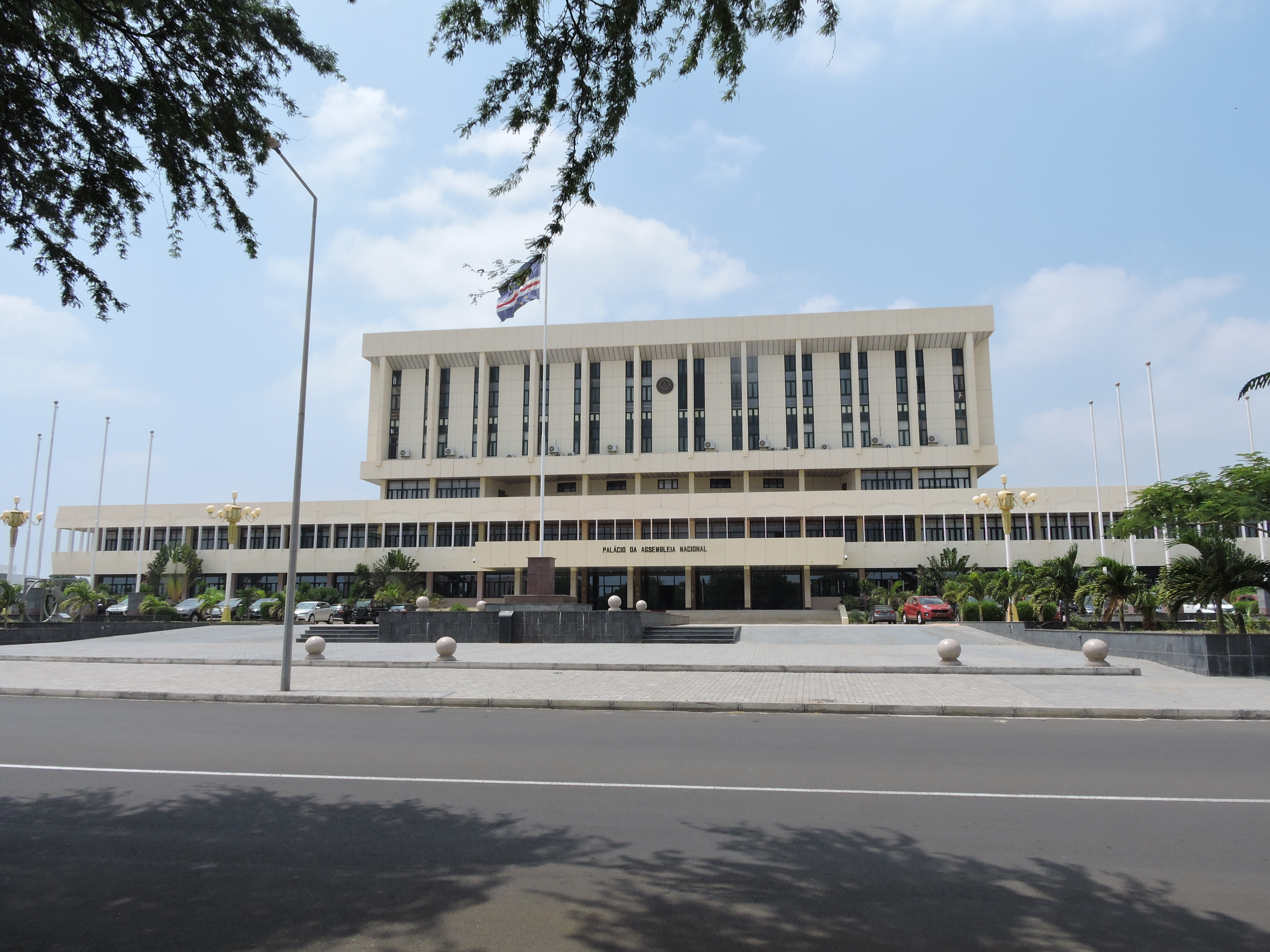
- National Assembly Building; Praia, Cape Verde
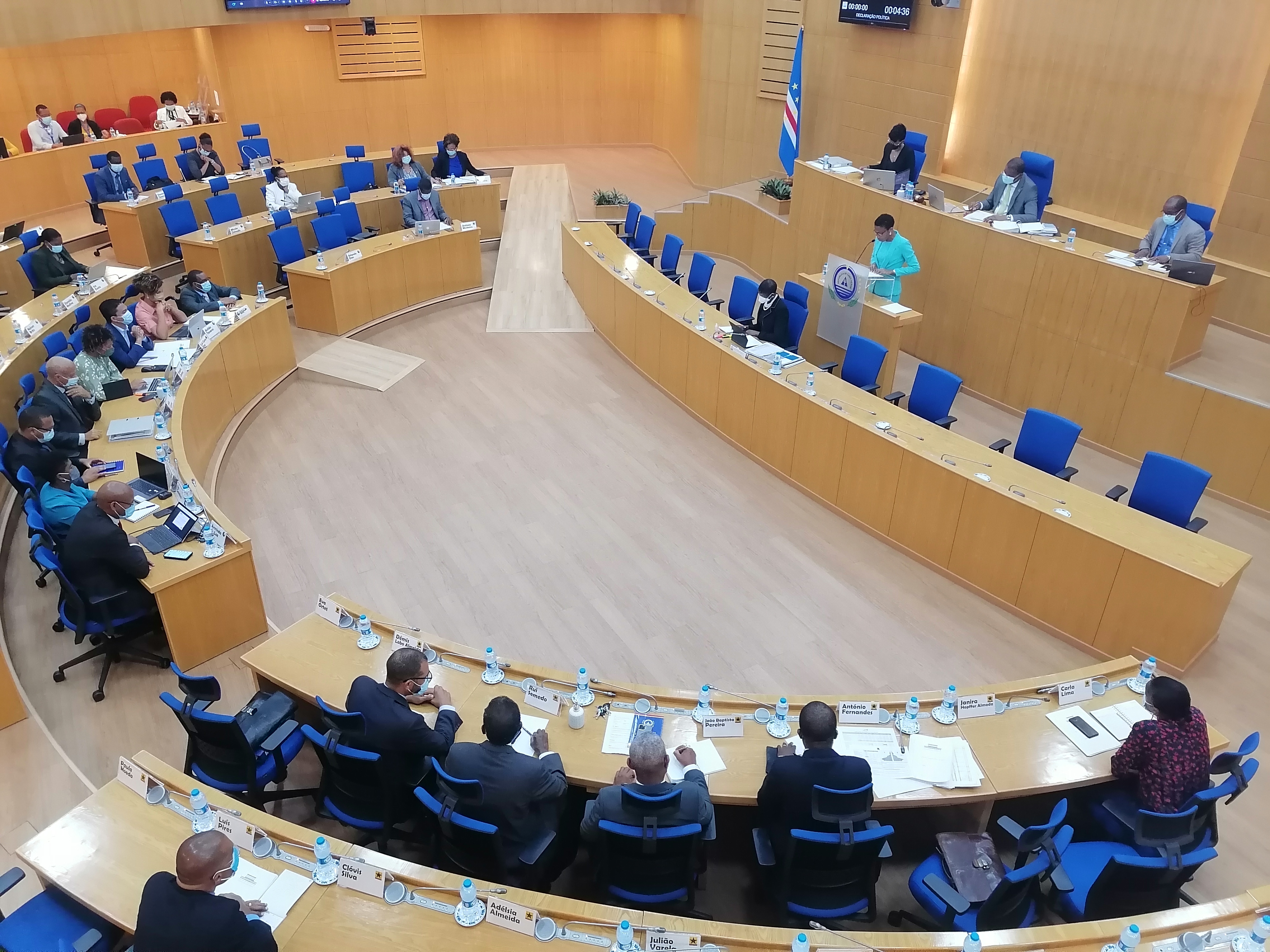

Website
- http://www.parlamento.cv/

The National Assembly (Portuguese: Assembleia Nacional) is the unicameral legislative body of Cape Verde.

== History ==
=== National People's Assembly (1975–1991) ===
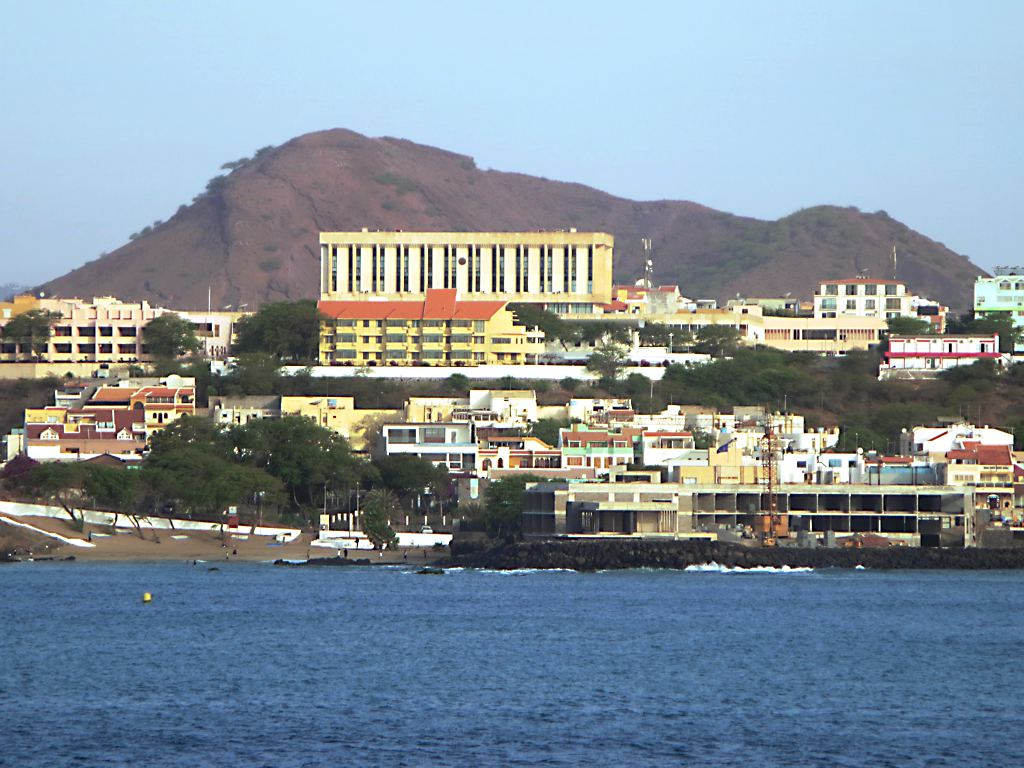
National Assembly building

The country's first legislative election took place in June 1975. The body was known as the National People's Assembly and its members came from the African Party for the Independence of Guinea and Cape Verde (PAIGC), which was the sole political party allowed to field candidates. They elected PAIGC Secretary-general Aristides Pereira President on 5 July 1975, when the country officially gained independence from Portugal.

One-party parliamentary elections were again held on 7 December 1980 with Pereira being re-elected unopposed by the Assembly on 12 February 1981. That same year the Cape Verdean branch of the PAIGC, which was also the ruling party in Guinea-Bissau, was renamed African Party for the Independence of Cape Verde (PAICV).

The 1985 parliamentary election for an enlarged 83-seat National People's Assembly took place on 7 December 1985. For the first time a few independent, PAICV-endorsed candidates won seats in the legislature.

In 1990, Cape Verde became one of the first African countries to abandon one-party rule and embrace multiparty democracy.

=== National Assembly (1991–2016) ===
The first multiparty National Assembly elections took place on 13 January 1991. The ruling PAICV was soundly defeated by the opposition Movement for Democracy (MpD), which won 56 out of 79 seats compared to the PAICV's 23. The elections were considered transparent, free, and fair.

In the next election, held on 17 December 1995, the number of Assembly seats was reduced from 79 to 72. The MpD won 50 seats and the PAICV won 21. The Democratic Convergence Party (PCD) won the remaining seat.

After the elections on 14 January 2001, the Assembly has a total of 72 directly elected members who serve five-year terms. They are elected from 16 multi-member constituencies using the D'Hondt method of party-list proportional representation.

Four parties and one coalition contested the election of 2001. They were the PAICV, MpD, Democratic Renewal Party (PRD), and the Social Democratic Party (PSD). Three parties—the Democratic Convergence Party (PCD), Democratic and Independent Cape Verdean Union (UCID), and the Labour and Solidarity Party (PTS)—formed a coalition known as the Democratic Alliance for Change (ADM). The election results were as follows:

PAICV - 49.50% of the vote and 40 seats
MpD - 40.55% of the vote and 30 seats
ADM - 6.12% of the vote and 2 seats
PRD - 3.38% of the vote and no seats
PSD - 0.45% of the vote and no seats

Eight women won seats in the National Assembly.

=== National Assembly (2016–present) ===
Following the parliamentary election in March 2016, the Movement for Democracy party won a majority of the seats in the election. This was the first time the ruling party PAICV have lost their majority in the parliament. Following the election Ulisses Correia e Silva became Prime Minister and Jorge Pedro Maurício dos Santos was elected President of the National Assembly. Following this defeat, the former ruling party the PAICV lost momentum and lost in the local and presidential elections in the same year.

== Presidents of the National Assembly ==
Name	Took office	Left office	Notes
Abílio Duarte	4 July 1975	25 February 1991	
Amilcar Spencer Lopes	25 February 1991	30 January 1996	
António do Espírito Santo Fonseca	30 January 1996	13 February 2001	
Aristides Raimundo Lima	13 February 2001	11 March 2011	
Basílio Mosso Ramos	11 March 2011	20 April 2016	
Jorge Pedro Maurício dos Santos	21 April 2016	19 May 2021	
Austelino Tavares Correia	19 May 2021	18 June 2026	
Janira Hopffer Almada	18 June 2026	Present	

== Constituencies ==
Cape Verde has thirteen constituencies for the National Assembly, of which 10 are in Cape Verde and the other three are abroad.

Constituency	No. of members
Santo Antão	7
São Vicente	11
São Nicolau	2
Sal	3
Boa Vista	2
Santiago North	14
Santiago South	18
Maio	2
Fogo	5
Brava	2
Africa	2
Americas	2
Europe and rest of the world	2
Total	72

== See also ==
- History of Cape Verde
- Legislative Branch
