= 2011 in Cape Verde =

- Decades: 1990s; 2000s; 2010s; 2020s
- See also: Other events of 2011; Timeline of Cabo Verdean history

Events in the year 2011 in Cape Verde.

== Incumbents ==
- President:
  - Pedro Pires
  - Jorge Carlos Fonseca
- Prime Minister: José Maria Neves

== Events ==
- Cape Verde signed the UN protocol, the Optional Protocol to the International Covenant on Economic, Social and Cultural Rights, also it ratified three conventions, the Convention on the Prevention and Punishment of the Crime of Genocide, the Optional Protocol to the Convention on the Elimination of All Forms of Discrimination against Women and the Convention on the Rights of Persons with Disabilities
- February 6: 2011 parliamentary elections took place
- March 11: The 5th José Maria Neves government began
- August 7–20: Cape Verdean presidential election took place in two rounds

== Arts and entertainment ==
- July 8: Criod ne São Cente, an album by Val Xalino was released

== Sports ==
- CS Mindelense won the Cape Verdean Football Championship

== Deaths ==
- Paula Fortes, independence activist (b. 1945)
- December 11: Carlina Pereira, activist, politician and the second First Lady of Cape Verde (b. around 1926)
- December 17: Cesária Évora (b. 1941), singer
