= 2003 in Cape Verde =

- Decades: 1980s; 1990s; 2000s; 2010s; 2020s
- See also: Other events of 2003; Timeline of Cabo Verdean history

The following lists events that happened during 2003 in Cape Verde.

== Incumbents ==
- President: Pedro Pires
- Prime Minister: José Maria Neves

== Events ==
- February 24: Monte Gordo Natural Park on São Nicolau established
- June 9: Instituto de Estudos Superiores Isidoro da Graça (IESIG) established in Mindelo
- September 19: Cape Verdean maritime delimitation treaty with Mauritania signed
- December 9: Roman Catholic Diocese of Mindelo established from the northern part of the Roman Catholic Diocese of Santiago de Cabo Verde

== Arts and entertainment ==
- September 23: Cesária Évora's 11th album Voz d'Amor was released

== Sports ==
- Académico do Aeroporto won the Cape Verdean Football Championship
