= 2009 in Cape Verde =

- Decades: 1980s; 1990s; 2000s; 2010s; 2020s
- See also: Other events of 2009; Timeline of Cabo Verdean history

The following lists events that happened during 2009 in Cape Verde.

== Incumbents ==
- President: Pedro Pires
- Prime Minister: José Maria Neves

== Events ==
- June 10: Cidade Velha became a UNESCO World Heritage Site
- December 22: reconstruction of São Pedro Airport (now Cesária Évora Airport) finished, it became an international airport

== Arts and entertainment ==
- May 25: Mayra Andrade's album Stória, stória... released
- October 26: Cesária Évora's album Nha Sentimento released

== Sports ==
- Sporting Clube da Praia won the Cape Verdean Football Championship

== Deaths ==
- April 5: Lela Violão (b. 1929)
- September 9: Tuna Mascarenhas (b. 1944)
- September 28: Manuel de Novas (b. 1938), writer
