= 2006 in Cape Verde =

- Decades: 1980s; 1990s; 2000s; 2010s; 2020s
- See also: History of Cape Verde; List of years in Cape Verde

The following lists events that happened during 2006 in Cape Verde.

== Incumbents ==
- President: Pedro Pires
- Prime Minister: José Maria Neves

== Events ==
- January 22: Cape Verdean parliamentary election, 2006
- February 12: Cape Verdean presidential election, 2006
- November 21: University of Cape Verde established

== Arts and entertainment ==
- Batuque, the Soul of a People documentary film released
- Mayra Andrade's album Navega released
- March 6: Cesária Évora's 12th album Rogamar was released

== Sports ==
- Sporting Clube da Praia won the Cape Verdean Football Championship

== Deaths ==
- Sérgio Ferreira (b. 1946), writer
