= 2004 in Cape Verde =

- Decades: 1980s; 1990s; 2000s; 2010s; 2020s
- See also: Other events of 2004; Timeline of Cabo Verdean history

The following lists events that happened during 2004 in Cape Verde.

== Incumbents ==
- President: Pedro Pires
- Prime Minister: José Maria Neves

== Events ==
- July 3: Local elections took place in the municipalities

== Arts and entertainment ==
- Germano Almeida's book O mar na Lajinha published

== Sports ==
- Sport Sal Rei Club won the Cape Verdean Football Championship

== Deaths ==
- Ildo Lobo (b. 1953), singer
