= 2002 in Cape Verde =

- Decades: 1980s; 1990s; 2000s; 2010s; 2020s
- See also: Other events of 2002; Timeline of Cabo Verdean history

The following lists events that happened during 2002 in Cape Verde.

== Incumbents ==
- President: Pedro Pires
- Prime Minister: José Maria Neves

== Events ==
- Cape Verde ratified two UN protocols, the Optional Protocol to the Convention on the Rights of the Child on the Involvement of Children in Armed Conflict and the Optional Protocol to the Convention on the Rights of the Child on the Sale of Children, Child Prostitution and Child Pornography
- December: The government prohibited the killing of turtles by law, per their participation in the Convention on Biological Diversity in 1995 and the Convention on International Trade in Endangered Species of Wild Fauna and Flora (CITES).

== Sports ==
- Sporting Praia won the Cape Verdean Football Championship
