= 2010 in Cape Verde =

- Decades: 1990s; 2000s; 2010s; 2020s
- See also: Other events of 2010; Timeline of Cabo Verdean history

The following events happened in Cape Verde in the year 2010.

== Incumbents ==
- President: Pedro Pires
- Prime Minister: José Maria Neves

== Events ==
- March 17 census: Population: 494,649

== Arts and entertainment ==
- November 29: Mayra Andrade's album Studio 105 released

== Sports ==
- Boavista FC won the Cape Verdean Football Championship

== Deaths ==
- Codé di Dona (b. 1940)
