= 2008 in Cape Verde =

- Decades: 1980s; 1990s; 2000s; 2010s; 2020s
- See also: Other events of 2008; Timeline of Cabo Verdean history

The following lists events that happened during 2008 in Cape Verde.

== Incumbents ==
- President: Pedro Pires
- Prime Minister: José Maria Neves

== Events ==
- January 9: food export ban from Santo Antão due to the agricultural pest, the Cape Verdean millipede (Spinotarsus caboverdus), lifted
- May 18: Local elections took place in the municipalities
- June 27: A new government under Prime Minister Neves was announced
- October 9: ISE, ISCEMAR and INAG were dissolved, having become part of the University of Cape Verde
- November 24: Universidade de Santiago opened in Assomada
- December 13: São Filipe Municipal Museum opened in the old town hall of São Filipe

== Sports ==
- Sporting Clube da Praia won the Cape Verdean Football Championship
