= 2013 in Cape Verde =

- Decades: 1990s; 2000s; 2010s; 2020s
- See also: Other events of 2013; Timeline of Cabo Verdean history

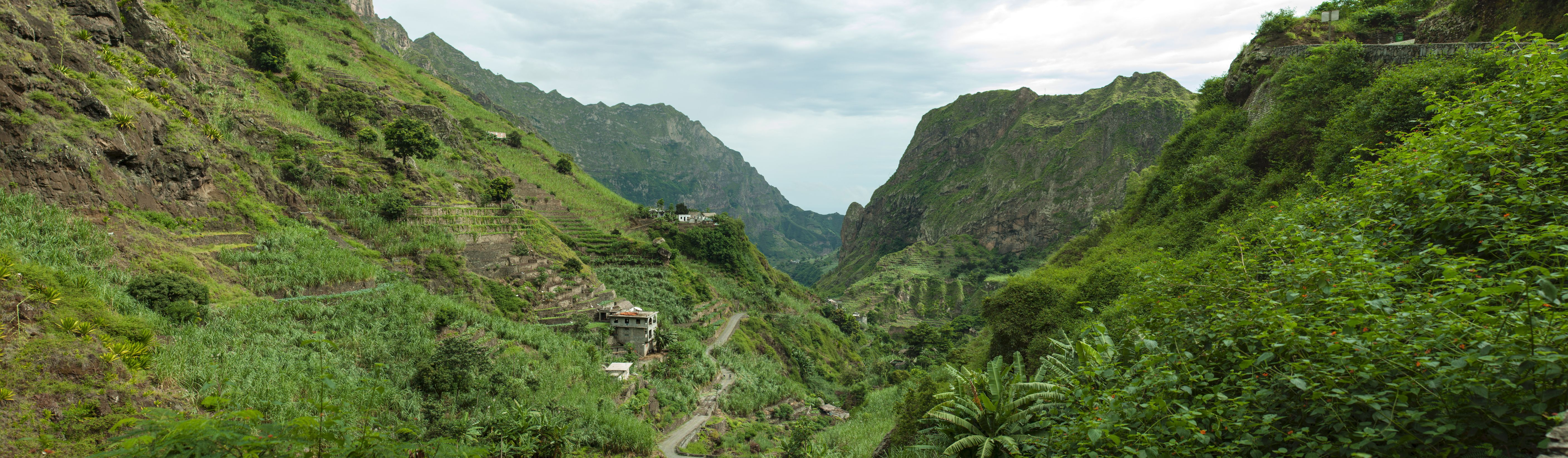

The following lists events that happened during 2013 in Cape Verde.

== Incumbents ==
- President: Jorge Carlos Fonseca
- Prime Minister: José Maria Neves

== Events ==
- June: A campus of the Universidade de Santiago opened in Tarrafal
- October 24 - Cape Verde decrees the official English-language rendering of its name to be the Republic of Cabo Verde.

== Sports ==
- CS Mindelense won the Cape Verdean Football Championship

== Deaths ==
- Bana (b. 1932), singer and performer
