= 2012 in Cape Verde =

- Decades: 1990s; 2000s; 2010s; 2020s
- See also: Other events of 2012; Timeline of Cabo Verdean history

The following lists events that happened during 2012 in Cape Verde.

== Incumbents ==
- President: Jorge Carlos Fonseca
- Prime Minister: José Maria Neves

== Events ==
- A campus of the Universidade de Santiago opened in the São José Seminary in Praia
- March 8: São Vicente's airport name became Cesária Évora Airport
- July 1: 2012 local elections took place

== Sports ==
- Sporting Clube da Praia won the Cape Verdean Football Championship
