= 2014 in Cape Verde =

- Decades: 1990s; 2000s; 2010s; 2020s
- See also: Other events of 2014; Timeline of Cabo Verdean history

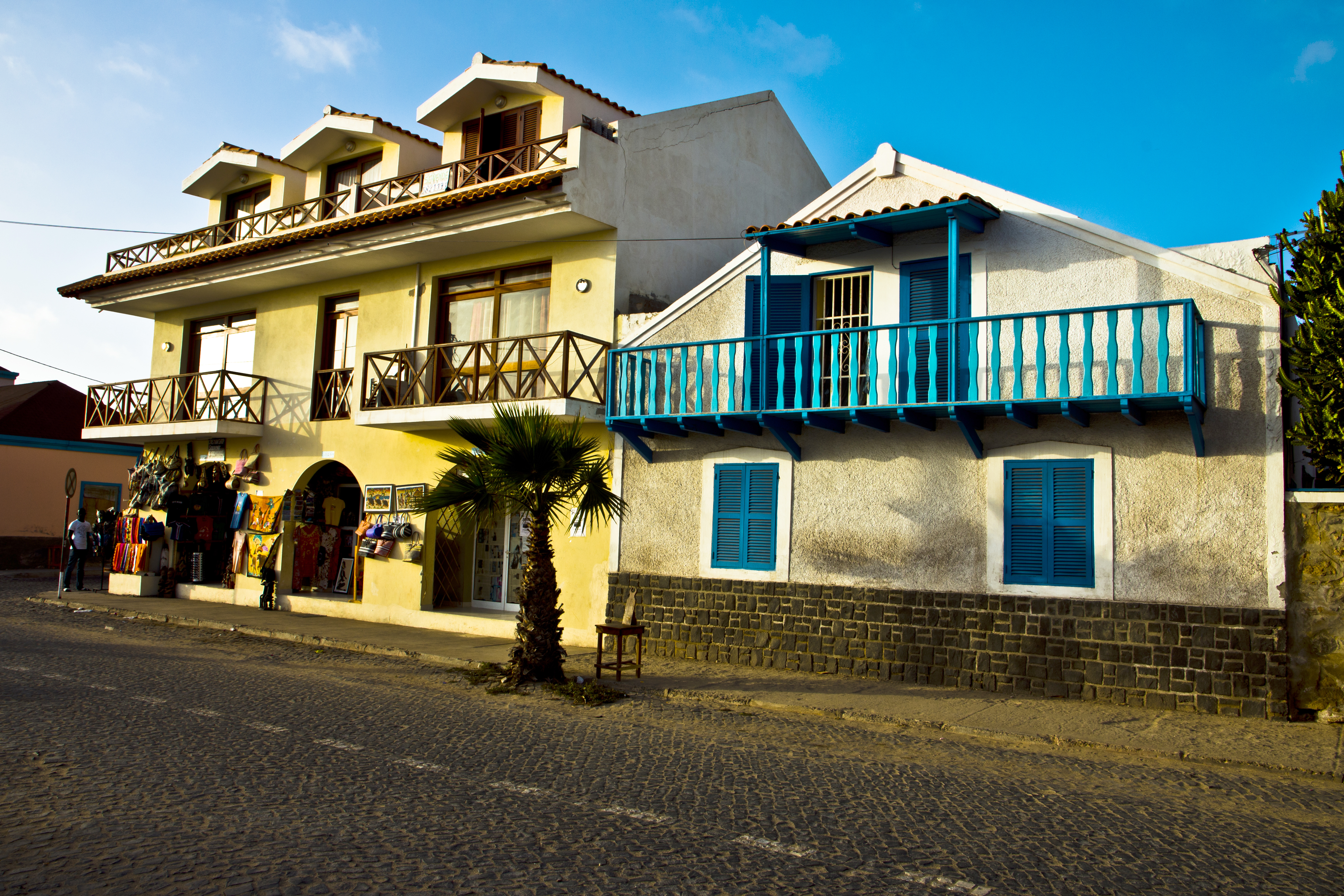
At Cap Verde on Sal. Beautiful houses

The following events happened in Cape Verde in the year 2014.

== Incumbents ==
- Prime Minister: José Maria Neves
- President: Jorge Carlos Fonseca

== Events ==
- Oceanpress, newspaper of the island of Sal published its first edition
- September 22: the 6th José Maria Neves Cabinet began
- November 23: Start of the 2014–15 eruption of Fogo

== Sports ==
- CS Mindelense won the Cape Verdean Football Championship
