= 2007 in Cape Verde =

- Decades: 1980s; 1990s; 2000s; 2010s; 2020s
- See also: Other events of 2007; Timeline of Cabo Verdean history

The following lists events that happened during 2007 in Cape Verde.

== Incumbents ==
- President: Pedro Pires
- Prime Minister: José Maria Neves

== Events ==
- First publication of newspaper A Nação
- Cape Verde signed two UN conventions, the Convention on the Rights of Persons with Disabilities and the International Convention for the Protection of All Persons from Enforced Disappearance
- November: Expansion of Rabil Airport (now Aristides Pereira International Airport) completed
- December: desalination plant opened in Porto Novo, Santo Antão

== Sports ==
- Sporting Clube da Praia won the Cape Verdean Football Championship
- Académica da Praia won the Taça Nacional de Cabo Verde

== Deaths ==
- João Vário (b. 1937), writer
