= 2005 in Cape Verde =

- Decades: 1980s; 1990s; 2000s; 2010s; 2020s
- See also: History of Cape Verde; List of years in Cape Verde

The following lists events that happened during 2005 in Cape Verde.

== Incumbents ==
- President: Pedro Pires
- Prime Minister: José Maria Neves

== Events ==
- ALUPEC was recognized by the Cape Verdean government as the writing system for Cape Verdean Creole
- Serra Malagueta Natural Park on Santiago established
- A campus of the Jean Piaget University of Cape Verde was opened in Mindelo
- Several municipalities were created:
  - Tarrafal de São Nicolau and Ribeira Brava from the former municipality of São Nicolau
  - São Lourenço dos Órgãos, from part of Santa Cruz
  - São Salvador do Mundo, from part of Santa Catarina
  - Ribeira Grande, from part of Praia
  - Santa Catarina do Fogo, from part of São Filipe
- February 25: Halcyonair airline established
- October 6: The first flight to the new Praia International Airport (since 2012: Nelson Mandela International Airport), which replaced the old Francisco Mendes International Airport,

== Sports ==
- FC Derby won the Cape Verdean Football Championship
