= Lígia Fonseca =

First Lady of Cape Verde from 2011 to 2021

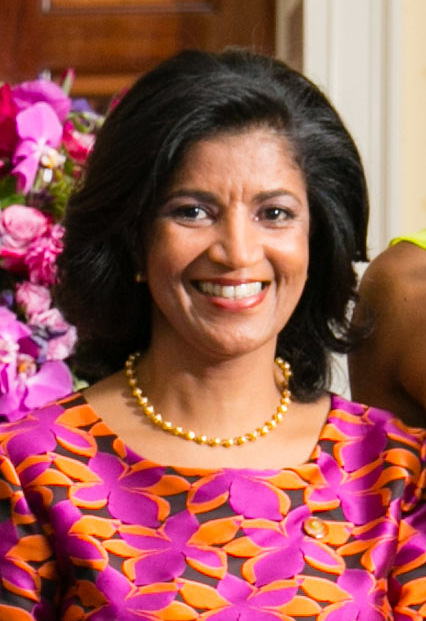

First Lady of Cape Verde
- In role 9 September 2011 – 9 November 2021
- President: Jorge Carlos Fonseca
- Preceded by: Adélcia Barreto Pires
- Succeeded by: Débora Katisa Carvalho

Personal details
- Born: Lígia Arcângela Lubrino Dias; 24 August 1963 (age 63) Beira, Portuguese Mozambique
- Party: Movement for Democracy
- Spouse: Jorge Carlos Fonseca (m. 1989)
- Children: Three
- Education: University of Lisbon
- Profession: Lawyer

Lígia Arcângela Lubrino Dias Fonseca (born 24 August 1963) is a Cape Verdean lawyer, activist, and politician who has served as the First Lady of Cape Verde from 2011 until 2021. Fonseca became the first female president of the Cape Verdean Lawyers' Association (OAC), the country's national bar association, in 2001. She is married to Cape Verdean former President Jorge Carlos Fonseca.

== Biography ==
Fonseca was born Lígia Arcângela Lubrino Dias in Beira, Portuguese Mozambique, on 24 August 1963, to Canta Dias and Máximo Dias. Her father, Máximo Dias, was a Mozambican lawyer, politician and leader of the MONAMO political party. In 1976, her family moved to Lisbon, Portugal, due to political instability in Mozambique.

Dias remained in Lisbon, despite hopes of returning to Beira. She enrolled in the Faculty of Law at the University of Lisbon, where she earned her law degree. She met her future husband, Jorge Carlos Fonseca, who is Cape Verdean, in 1987 while attending the university. The couple married on March 26, 1989, at a ceremony in Portugal. They have three daughters.

They then moved to Macau, where her husband had been hired as a law professor at the University of Macau. The couple moved to Cape Verde in 1991, marking the first time she had lived in an African country since leaving Mozambique in 1976.

On April 30, 2001, Fonseca became the first woman to be elected President of the Cape Verdian Lawyers' Association (Ordem dos Advogados de Cabo Verde). A dissenting group of lawyers argued that she had not been a member of OAC for at least 10 years, but her election was upheld. Fonseca's inauguration as the first female head of the OAC took place on 19 May 2001. She served as President from 2001 until 2004, when she was succeeded by Dr. Carlos Alberto Veiga.

Jorge Carlos Fonseca was elected President in the second round of the 2011 Cape Verdean presidential election, making Lígia Fonseca the fourth First Lady of Cape Verde. Lígia Fonseca sought to focus on social issues during her tenure. She continued to practice law as an active lawyer after becoming first lady.

== Honours ==
=== Foreign honours ===
- Portugal: Grand Cross of the Order of Prince Henry (22 November 2017)
- Netherlands: Grand Cross of the Order of the Crown (10 December 2018)
