= First Lady of Cape Verde =

Wife of the president of Cape Verde

- Primeira-dama do Cabo Verde

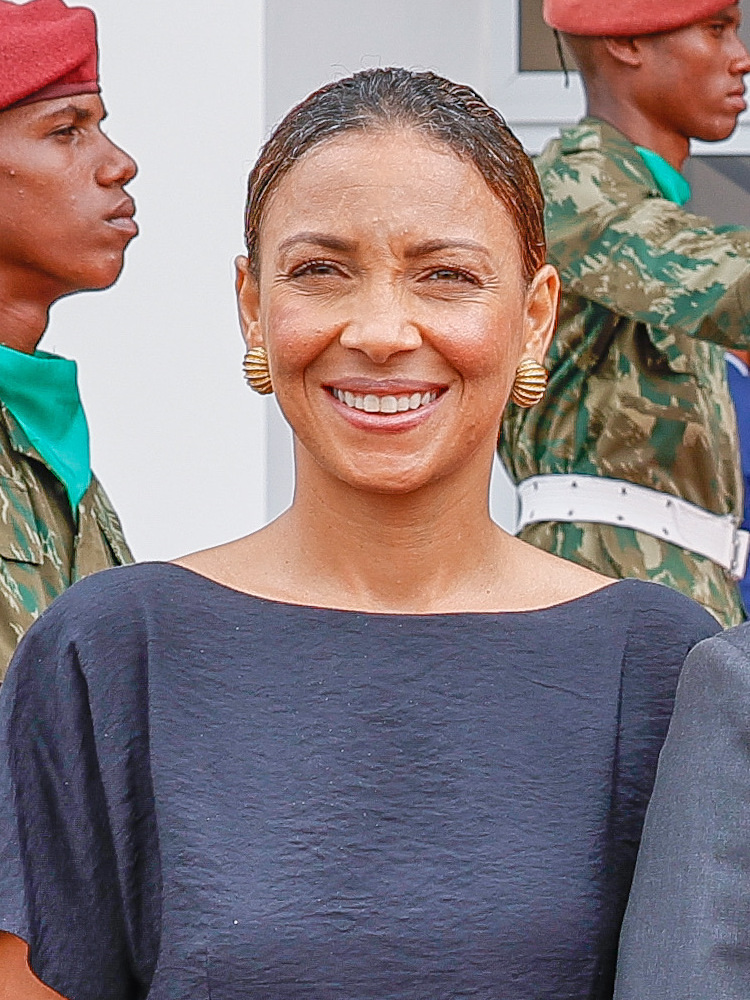
- Incumbent; Débora Katisa Carvalho since 9 November 2021
- Residence: Presidential Palace of Cape Verde
- Term length: 5 years
- Inaugural holder: Carlina Pereira
- Formation: July 8, 1975

First Lady of Cape Verde (Portuguese: Primeira-dama do Cabo Verde) is the title attributed to the wife of the president of Cape Verde. The position is currently held by Débora Katisa Carvalho, wife of President José Maria Neves.

== First ladies of Cape Verde ==
No.	Name	Portrait	Term Began	Term Ended	President of Cape Verde	Notes
1	Carlina Pereira		22 March 1975	22 March 1991	Aristides Pereira	Independence activist and inaugural First Lady of Cape Verde.
2	Tuna Mascarenhas		22 March 1991	22 March 2001	António Mascarenhas Monteiro	Mascarenhas continued to work at the clinical analysis laboratory at Agostinho Neto Hospital during her two terms as first lady.
3	Adélcia Barreto Pires		22 March 2001	9 September 2011	Pedro Pires	
4	Ligia Fonseca		9 September 2011	9 November 2021	Jorge Carlos Fonseca	
5	Débora Katisa Carvalho		9 November 2021		José Maria Neves	
