= Modernize São Vicente Movement =

Political party in Cape Verde

The Modernize São Vicente Movement (Portuguese: Movimento Modernizar São Vicente) is a regional political party in São Vicente, Cabo Verde.

== History ==
In the 2004 local elections the party received 5.4% of the vote in São Vicente. Although it failed to win a seat in the Municipal Council, it won a single seat in the Municipal Assembly, taken by Maria Helena A. Modesto Leite.
