= 2021 Cape Verdean presidential election =

Election of José Maria Neves

- 17 October 2021
- Registered: 398,690
- Turnout: 47.99%
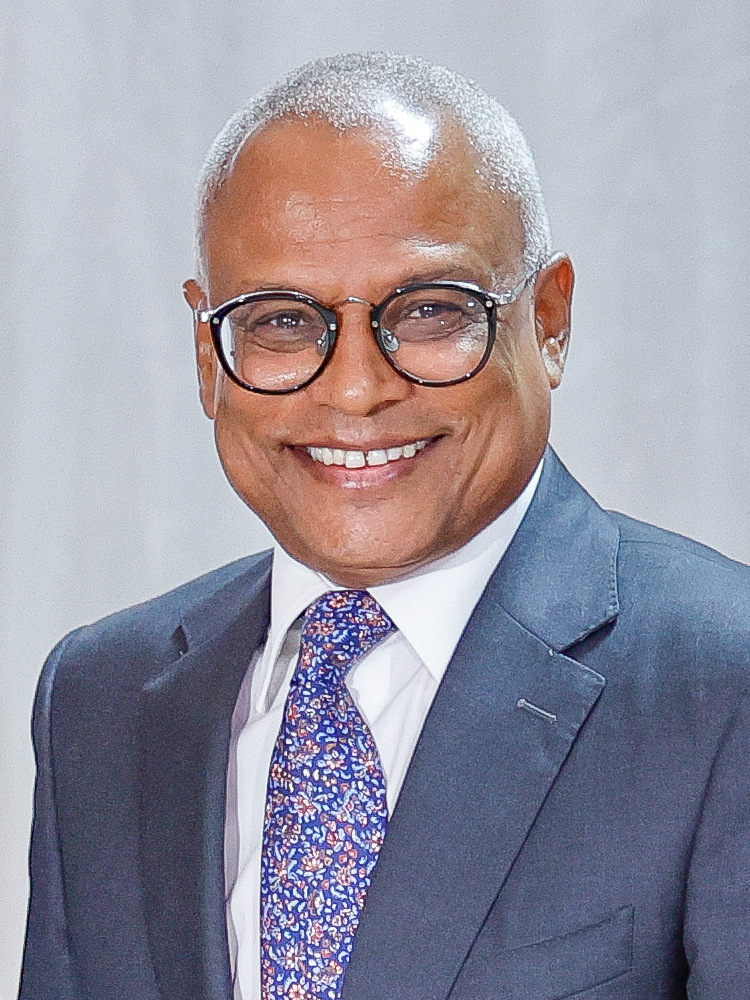

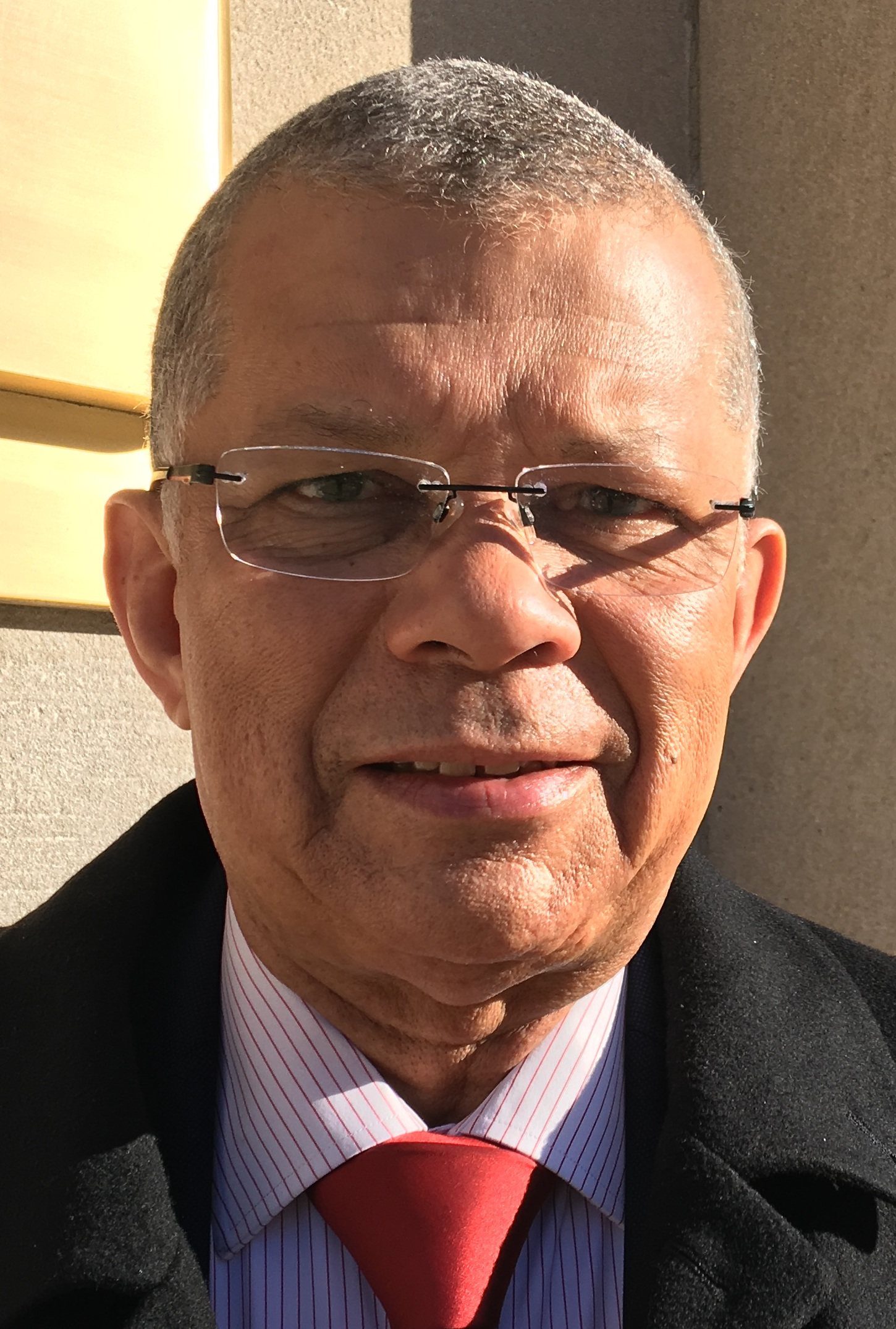
Nominee	José Maria Neves	Carlos Veiga
Party	PAICV	MpD
Popular vote	96,035	78,603
Percentage	51.79%	42.39%
President before election
Jorge Carlos Fonseca
MpD
Elected President
José Maria Neves
PAICV

Presidential elections were held in Cape Verde on 17 October 2021. The result was a victory for José Maria Neves of the opposition African Party for the Independence of Cape Verde (PAICV), who received 51.8% of the vote.

== Background ==
The outgoing president Jorge Carlos Fonseca was first elected after the 2011 election, and was re-elected in 2016 after winning 74% of the popular vote.

== Electoral system ==
The president was elected using the two-round system by registered voters residing in the country and abroad. Eligible candidates must be citizens "of Cape Verdean origin, who hold no other nationality"; over 35 years of age on the date of candidacy; and have resided in the country for three years prior to that date. The application to register as a candidate must be presented to the Constitutional Court for approval, and requires the signatures of at least 1,000 and at most 4,000 electors.

On 27 July 2021 incumbent president Jorge Carlos Fonseca issued a decree confirming that the election would be held on 17 October, with a second round provisionally scheduled for 31 October. Fonseca himself was ineligible to run due to term limits. The constitution requires candidates to register 60 days prior to the election, thus setting the deadline at 17 August.

== Candidates ==
The two dominant parties, the PAICV and the Movement for Democracy (MpD), both nominated former prime ministers as their candidates. The PAICV nominated José Maria Neves, and the MpD nominated Carlos Veiga. Veiga ran for the presidency in 2001 (when he lost by just 12 votes out of 153,406 cast in the second round) and 2006 (losing by a margin of less than 2%).

Besides the two main competitors, five more candidates appeared on the ballot.

== Campaign ==
The campaign period began on 30 September and ended on 15 October. Frontrunners Veiga and Neves both pledged to stabilize the country due to the ongoing COVID-19 crisis, which heavily destabilized the economy.

== Results ==
PAICV candidate José Maria Neves was elected in the first round with over 51% of the vote. This was the first time the PAICV won a presidential election since 2006, when Pedro Pires was re-elected president for a second term.

Candidate	Party	Votes	%
José Maria Neves	African Party for the Independence of Cape Verde	96,035	51.79
Carlos Veiga	Movement for Democracy	78,603	42.39
Casimiro de Pina	Independent	3,345	1.80
Fernando Rocha Delgado	Independent	2,518	1.36
Hélio Sanches	Independent	2,134	1.15
Gilson dos Santos Alves	Independent	1,410	0.76
Joaquim Monteiro	Independent	1,403	0.76
Total		185,448	100.00
Valid votes		185,448	96.92
Invalid votes		1,592	0.83
Blank votes		4,295	2.24
Total votes		191,335	100.00
Registered voters/turnout		398,690	47.99
Source: Boletim Oficial

== Aftermath ==
Late on election day, Veiga conceded defeat, stating: "The will of the people was heard and the will of the people was granted. I want to offer my congratulations to Jose Maria on his election as president of the republic." Neves celebrated his win and said he wanted to be the "president of all Cape Verdeans", adding that it was "a great responsibility to preside over the Cape Verdean nation in these difficult times, and I receive this victory with the great humility."
