= Tuna Mascarenhas =

Cape Verdean activist, medical laboratory scientist and First Lady of Cape Verde

First Lady of Cape Verde
- In office 22 March 1991 – 22 March 2001
- President: António Mascarenhas Monteiro
- Preceded by: Carlina Pereira
- Succeeded by: Adélcia Barreto Pires

Personal details
- Born: 13 June 1944
- Died: 9 September 2009 (aged 65) Praia, Cape Verde
- Spouse: António Mascarenhas Monteiro (1966–2009; her death)
- Children: Marisa, Gamal, Liliana

Antonina Mascarenhas Monteiro, more popularly known as Tuna Mascarenhas, (13 June 1944 – 9 September 2009) was a Cape Verdean activist and medical laboratory scientist. She served as the First Lady of Cape Verde from 1991 until 2001 during the tenure of her husband, President António Mascarenhas Monteiro. Mascarenhas also founded the Cape Verdean Children's Foundation to provide services, such as daycare centers, to poor children and their families.

== Biography ==
Tuna Mascarenhas was born on 13 June 1944. She received her bachelor's degree in chemistry from a university in Belgium. She attended the same university with her future husband, António Mascarenhas Monteiro. She returned to Cape Verde after college, where she worked at the present-day Agostinho Neto Hospital in Praia as an employee of the Ministry of Health. Both she and her husband were active in the Cape Verdean independence movement during the 1960s and 1970s. However, she left the movement over a difference of ideology with some of its goals.

In 1991, António Mascarenhas Monteiro was elected President of Cape Verde by defeating incumbent founding President Aristides Pereira. Tuna Mascarenhas became the country's second First Lady in March 1991. However, despite her new position, Mascarenhas kept her job at the clinical analysis laboratory at Agostinho Neto Hospital through her time in the presidential palace. She was an active first lady, who advocated for numerous issues during her tenure from 1991 to 2001. In addition to her job at the hospital, she was often spotted around Praia, including the markets and beaches.

Mascarenhas founded the Cape Verdean Children’s Foundation, which provided social services to poor children. Her foundation also provided daycare for children, aged newborn to 3-years old, for impoverished children. Without the center, women often had few places to bring their small children when they found employment.

Tuna Mascarenhas died of intestinal obstruction on 9 September 2009, at the age of 65. She was survived by her husband, former President António Mascarenhas Monteiro, and their three children. Her funeral was held on 10 September 2009.
