= Carlina Pereira =

Cape Verdean activist, politician and First Lady

First Lady of Cape Verde
- In office 8 March 1975 – 22 March 1991
- President: Aristides Pereira
- Preceded by: Position created
- Succeeded by: Tuna Mascarenhas

Personal details
- Born: c. 1926 Portuguese Cape Verde
- Died: 11 December 2011 (aged 85) Praia, Cape Verde
- Party: African Party for the Independence of Cape Verde (after 1981)
- Other political affiliations: African Party for the Independence of Guinea and Cape Verde (before 1981)
- Spouse: Aristides Pereira (?–2011; his death)
- Children: Estela Maria Pereira; Manuela Pereira

Carlina Fortes Pereira (c. 1926 – 11 December 2011) was a Cape Verdean activist, politician, and prominent figure within the country's independence movement during the Portuguese colonial era. Following independence, she became country's inaugural First Lady of Cape Verde during the presidency of her husband, Aristides Pereira, from 1975 to 1991.

== Biography ==
Pereira married Aristides Pereira, the future President of Cape Verde. During the 1960s, she moved from Portuguese Cape Verde to Conakry, Guinea, where her husband, a fellow member of the pro-independence African Party for the Independence of Guinea and Cape Verde (PAIGC), was already living in exile.

Carlina Pereira became the first First Lady of Cape Verde in 1975 upon independence from Portugal. She was also elected honorary president of the Organization of Cape Verdean Women (OMCV) during the same period. Pereira held the position of First Lady from 1975 until 1991 when President Pereira left office. She was succeeded in the role by Cape Verde's second first lady, Tuna Mascarenhas.

Both Carlina and Aristides Pereira suffered from declining health during their later years. Carlina Pereira became sick with a long-term illness beginning in 2009. In 2010, she was flown to Portugal for medical treatment. She returned to Cape Verde in June 2011, as she reportedly wished to spend her remaining life at her home in the Prainha neighborhood of Praia.

Former President Aristides Pereira died in Portugal on 22 September 2011, following complications of diabetes and surgery to repair a broken femur. Carila Pereira, who had been in declining health, died just three months later on 11 December 2011 in Praia, Cape Verde, aged 85.
