= João Valente Bank =

Coral reef in Cape Verde

- Location within Cape Verde

Highest point
- Elevation: −10 m (−33 ft)
- Listing: Seamounts
- Coordinates: 15°38′33″N 23°6′55″W

Geography
- Location: between the islands of Boa Vista and Maio

The João Valente Bank is a coral reef located between the islands of Boa Vista (20 nautical miles; 37 km; 23 mi) and Maio (25 nautical miles; 46 km; 29 mi), Cape Verde.

== Overview ==
The reef stands on a seamount (guyot) about 100 meters (330 ft) under sea level, and rises up to 10 meters (33 ft) below the surface. The seamount rises from about 1,000 meters (3,300 ft). It is about 15 nmi (28 km; 17 mi) long and 9 nmi (17 km; 10 mi) wide, and breaking waves can already be observed at moderate wind. The reef has a high biodiversity of fish.
