= Cape Verde–Mauritania Maritime Delimitation Treaty =

Maritime delimination treaty

Cape Verde – Mauritania Maritime Delimitation Treaty
Treaty on the Delimitation of the Maritime Frontier between the Islamic Republic of Mauritania and the Republic of Cape Verde
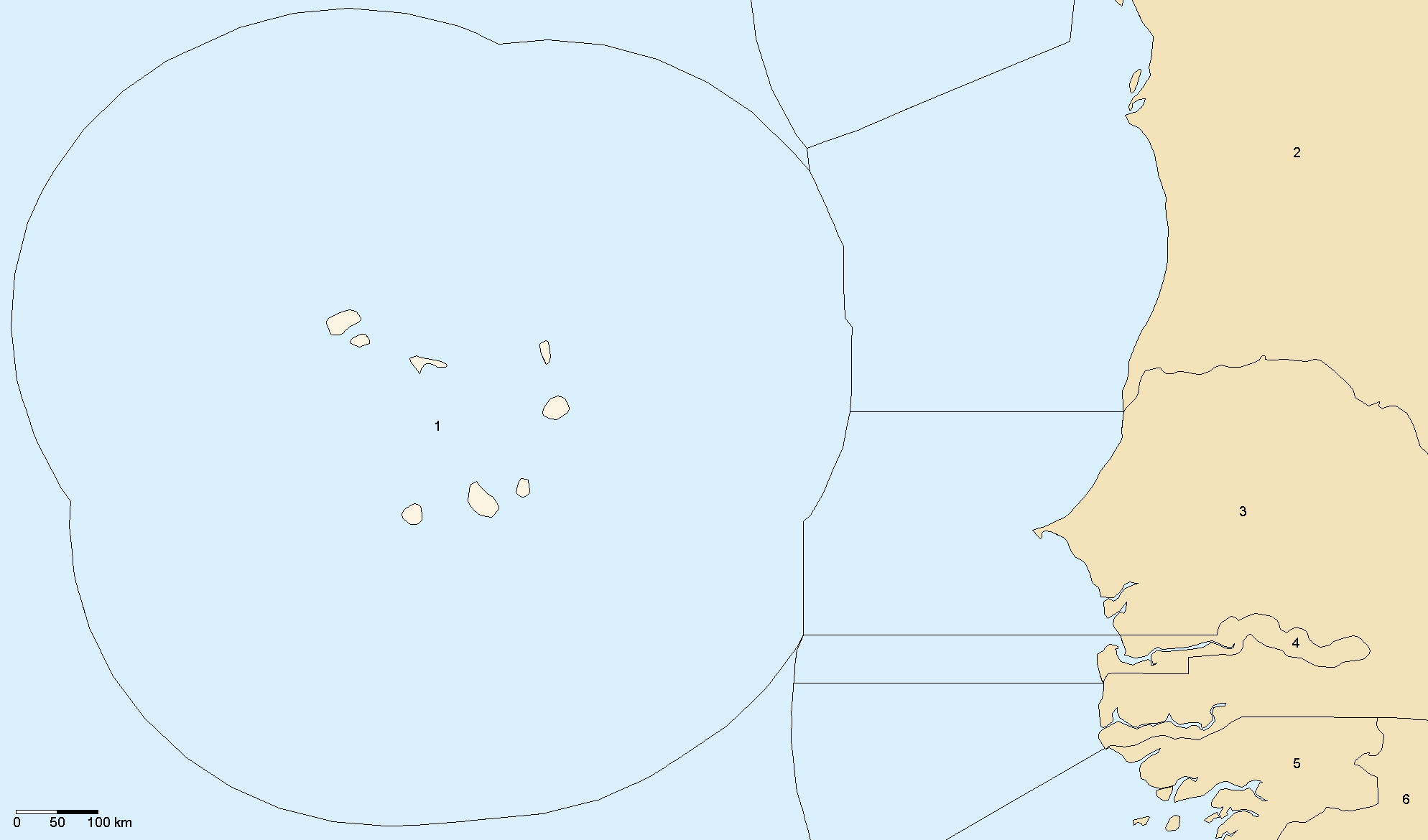
- Maritime boundaries of Cape Verde, Mauritania, and neighboring countries.
- Type: Boundary delimitation
- Signed: 19 September 2003
- Location: Praia, Cape Verde
- Parties: Cape Verde; Mauritania
- Depositary: United Nations Secretariat
- Languages: Arabic; French; Portuguese

The Cape Verde – Mauritania Maritime Delimitation Treaty is a treaty between Cape Verde and Mauritania in which the two states agreed to the delimitation of their maritime boundary.

The treaty was signed at Praia on 19 September 2003 and was ratified by Cape Verde on 23 April 2004. The boundary is approximately 160 nautical miles (300 km; 180 mi) long and trends north–south; the treaty defines it in explicit maritime segments using 18 specific points.

The official name for the treaty is Treaty on the Delimitation of the Maritime Frontier between the Islamic Republic of Mauritania and the Republic of Cape Verde.
