= Gorgades =

Island group and fabled inhabitants

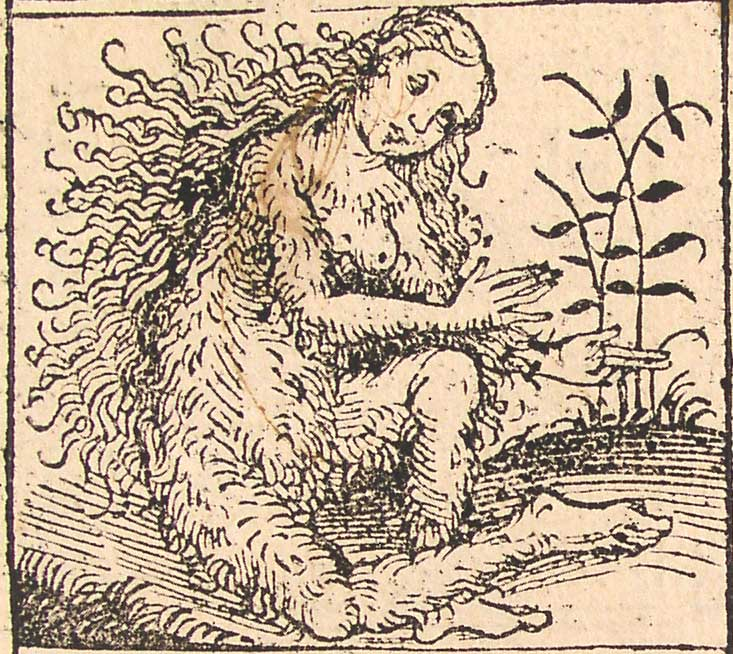
Illustration from the Nuremberg Chronicle (1493)

The Gorgades may refer to a group of islands off the Atlantic coast of Africa (the Insulae Gorgades, perhaps the Canaries or the Cape Verde islands), as well as the fabled tribe of native inhabitants, the women of which were covered entirely with hair (an idea perhaps derived from ancient sailors' accounts of some species of ape or monkey).

== Ancient sources ==
Their earliest known mention appears in Book III, Chapter 9, of the Description of the World of Pomponius Mela (c. 43 CE), which speaks of "a huge island, on which they say there are only women, bristly in their whole body, and fruitful of their own accord without any connections with males: of so savage and excessively wild manners that some of them can scarcely be restrained by chains from struggling."

The ancient mentions most widely read in the Middle Ages were those of the Roman naturalist Pliny the Elder and geographer Gaius Julius Solinus. In his Natural History Pliny names the Greek geographer Xenophon of Lampsacus as the one who identified the islands and the Carthaginian navigator Hanno as one who visited there in the fifth or sixth century BCE. Following Pliny, Solinus writes, "Women were found swift as birds; out of all those they saw, two were captured, so hairy and rough of body that Hanno, for remembrance of the occurrence, hung up their two skins in the temple of Juno, where they remained until the time of the destruction of Carthage."

These islands and inhabitants were subsequently mentioned by such medieval writers as Thomas de Cantimpre in the Liber de Natura Rerum and Vincent of Beauvais in the Speculum Historiale, going on to be included in medieval bestiaries, which especially focused on the hairiness of the females.
