= 2004 Cape Verdean local elections =

Local elections were held in Cape Verde on 21 March 2004. The Movement for Democracy (MpD) won in the municipalities of Boa Vista, Paul, Porto Novo, São Domingos and Tarrafal, the MpD-affiliated Ribeira Grande Democratic Group (GDRG) won in Ribeira Grande, while the African Party for the Independence of Cape Verde (PAICV) won in the municipalities of Mosteiros, Praia the capital, Santa Catarina do Fogo and São Filipe.

== Results ==
Municipality	Party	Municipal Council			Municipal Assembly		
Municipality	Party	Votes	%	Seats	Votes	%	Seats
Boa Vista	MpD	1,358	65.04	5	1,352	64.78	8
Boa Vista	PAICV	730	34.96	0	735	35.22	5
Brava	PAICV	1,655	61.50	5	1,645	61.68	8
Brava	MpD	1,036	31.50	0	1,022	38.32	5
Maio	MpD	1,631	58.86	5	1,638	59.11	8
Maio	PAICV	1,113	40.17	0	1,101	39.73	5
Maio	MDM	27	0.97	0	32	1.15	0
Mosteiros	PAICV	2,531	66.07	5	2,516	35.73	9
Mosteiros	MpD	1,300	33.93	0	1,312	34.27	4
Paul	MpD	2,055	56.12	5	2,059	56.44	7
Paul	PAICV	1,607	43.8	0	1,589	43.56	6
Porto Novo	MpD	3,152	49.76	4	3,150	49.86	9
Porto Novo	PAICV	3,029	47.81	3	2,982	47.20	8
Porto Novo	PCD–PRD	154	2.43	0	86	2.94	0
Praia	PAICV	15,932	52.05	9	15,733	51.37	11
Praia	MpD	13,193	43.10	0	13,261	43.30	9
Praia	PCD–PRD	1,330	4.35	0	1,487	4.86	1
Praia	UCID	153	0.50	0	147	0.48	0
Ribeira Grande	GDRG	5,723	77.45	7	5,512	74.33	13
Ribeira Grande	PAICV	1,666	22.55	0	1,904	25.67	4
Sal	GIMDS	2,867	55.30	7	2,867	55.21	9
Sal	PAICV	2,317	44.70	0	2,326	44.79	8
Santa Catarina	PAICV	5,733	50.42	9	5,754	50.46	11
Santa Catarina	MpD	5,015	43.95	0	5,041	44.20	10
Santa Catarina	PCD–PRD	482	4.22	0	464	4.07	0
Santa Catarina	NU BAI	160	1.40	0	145	1.27	0
Santa Cruz	PAICV	5,686	53.13	7	5,650	52.89	11
Santa Cruz	MpD	5,016	46.87	0	5,033	47.11	10
São Domingos	MpD	3,507	72.21	7	3,516	72.17	12
São Domingos	GID–SD	1,350	27.79	0	1,356	27.83	5
São Filipe	PAICV	5,221	55.80	7	5,248	56.16	10
São Filipe	MpD	4,135	44.20	0	4,096	43.84	7
São Miguel	MpD	2,811	64.40	7	2,772	63.33	11
São Miguel	PAICV	1,015	23.25	0	1,011	23.10	4
São Miguel	PCD–PRD	539	12.35	0	594	13.57	2
São Nicolau	MpD	2,827	59.40	7	2,869	60.07	10
São Nicolau	PAICV	1,932	40.60	0	1,907	39.93	7
São Vicente	MpD	7,875	36.01	4	7,818	35.75	8
São Vicente	PAICV	6,614	30.25	3	6,838	31.27	7
São Vicente	UCID	3,737	17.09	1	3,684	16.85	3
São Vicente	PTS	2,472	11.30	1	2,367	10.82	2
São Vicente	MMSV	1,170	5.35	0	1,162	5.31	1
Tarrafal	MpD	3,338	70.14	7	3,287	68.82	12
Tarrafal	PAICV	1,050	22.06	0	1,016	21.27	4
Tarrafal	PCD–PRD	371	7.80	0	473	9.90	1
