= 2006 Cape Verdean presidential election =

Re-election of Pedro Pires

- 12 February 2006
- Registered: 323,554
- Turnout: 53.10%
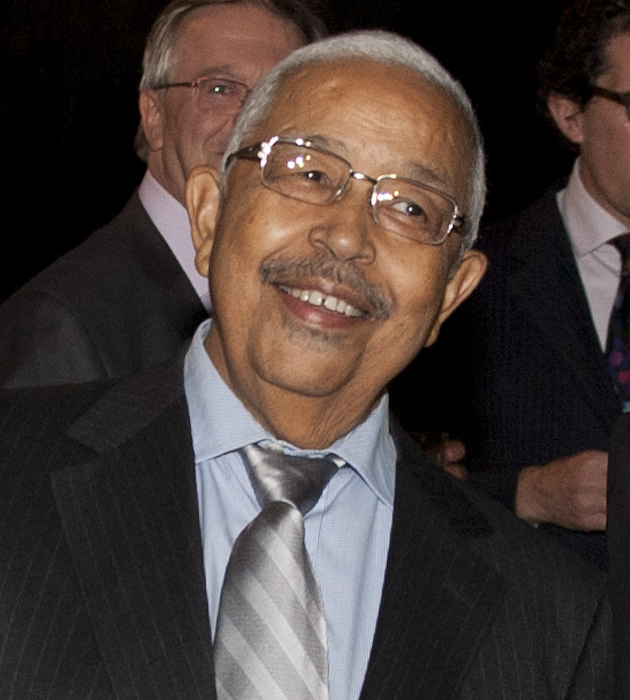

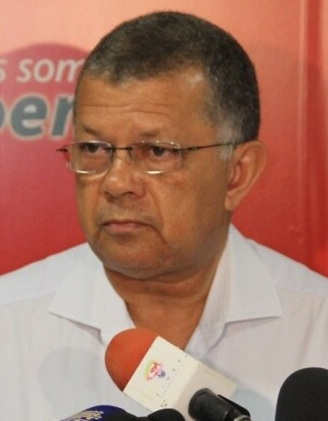
Nominee	Pedro Pires	Carlos Veiga
Party	PAICV	MpD
Popular vote	86,583	83,241
Percentage	50.98%	49.02%
- Results by municipality
President before election
Pedro Pires
PAICV
Elected President
Pedro Pires
PAICV

Presidential elections were held in Cape Verde on 12 February 2006, the fourth presidential elections since the introduction of multi-party politics in 1990.

In a repeat of the 2001 election, Pedro Pires of the ruling African Party for the Independence of Cape Verde (PAICV) was challenged by former Prime Minister Carlos Veiga of the Movement for Democracy (MpD). In the 2001 presidential run-off, Pires had defeated Veiga by a margin of only 12 votes. In 2006, Pires won another narrow victory, prevailing by about 3,000 votes and slightly surpassing the 50% majority necessary to avoid a run-off.

== Results ==
Candidate	Party	Votes	%
Pedro Pires	African Party for the Independence of Cape Verde	86,583	50.98
Carlos Veiga	Movement for Democracy	83,241	49.02
Total		169,824	100.00
Valid votes		169,824	98.84
Invalid votes		1,327	0.77
Blank votes		668	0.39
Total votes		171,819	100.00
Registered voters/turnout		323,554	53.10
Source: Boletim Oficial
