= 2011 Cape Verdean presidential election =

Election of Jorge Carlos Fonseca

- 7 August 2011 (first round); 21 August 2011 (second round)
- Registered: 304,621
- Turnout: 53.50% (first round); 59.87% (second round)
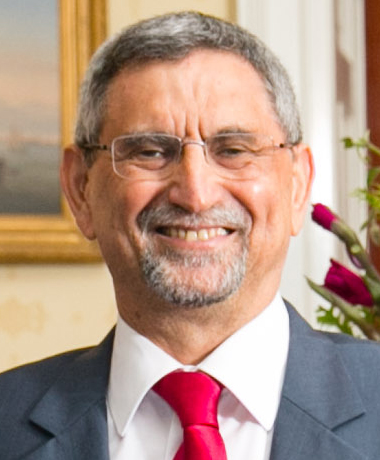

Nominee	Jorge Carlos Fonseca	Manuel Inocêncio Sousa
Party	MpD	PAICV
Popular vote	97,735	82,379
Percentage	54.26%	45.74%
President before election
Pedro Pires
PAICV
Elected President
Jorge Carlos Fonseca
Movement for Democracy

Presidential elections were held in Cape Verde on 7 August 2011, with a second round run-off on 21 August. The result was a victory for Jorge Carlos Fonseca of the Movement for Democracy, who received 54% of the vote in the second round.

== Campaign ==
Four candidates contested the elections:

- Manuel Inocêncio Sousa, a former Foreign Minister and the candidate of the ruling African Party for the Independence of Cape Verde (PAICV).
- Aristides Lima, President of the National Assembly. A member of the PAICV, he ran without its support. Received support of the Democratic and Independent Cape Verdean Union and the Labour and Solidarity Party.
- Jorge Carlos Fonseca, another former Foreign Minister, and the candidate of the opposition Movement for Democracy.
- Joaquim Monteiro, an independent.

== Results ==
Candidate	Party	First round		Second round	
Candidate	Party	Votes	%	Votes	%
Jorge Carlos Fonseca	Movement for Democracy	60,887	37.79	97,735	54.26
Manuel Inocêncio Sousa	African Party for the Independence of Cape Verde	52,612	32.66	82,379	45.74
Aristides Lima	Democratic and Independent Cape Verdean Union–Labour and Solidarity Party	44,648	27.71		
Joaquim Jaime Monteiro	Independent	2,958	1.84		
Total		161,105	100.00	180,114	100.00
Valid votes		161,105	98.87	180,114	98.77
Invalid votes		845	0.52	767	0.42
Blank votes		996	0.61	1,482	0.81
Total votes		162,946	100.00	182,363	100.00
Registered voters/turnout		304,621	53.49	304,621	59.87
Source: Boletim Oficial
