= History of Cape Verde =

The recorded human history of Cabo Verde begins with the Portuguese discovery of the island in 1458. Possible early references to Cape Verde date back at least 2,000 years.

== Prehistory ==
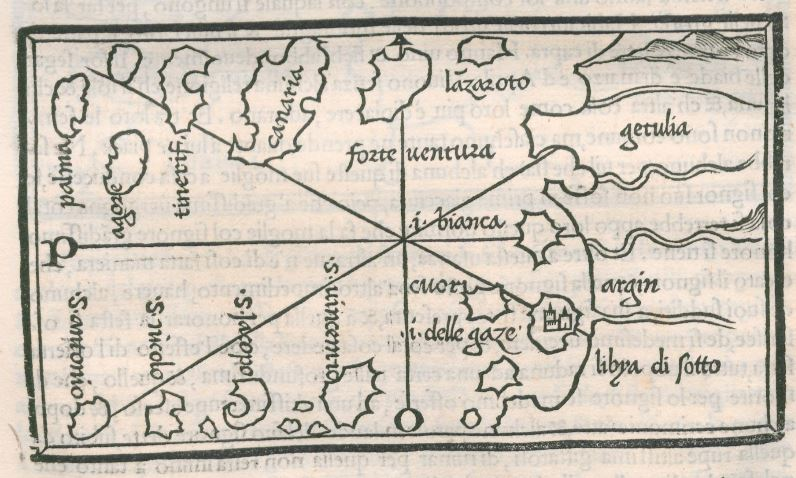
The Canary Islands and Cape Verde in the 1534 Isolario by Benedetto Bordone

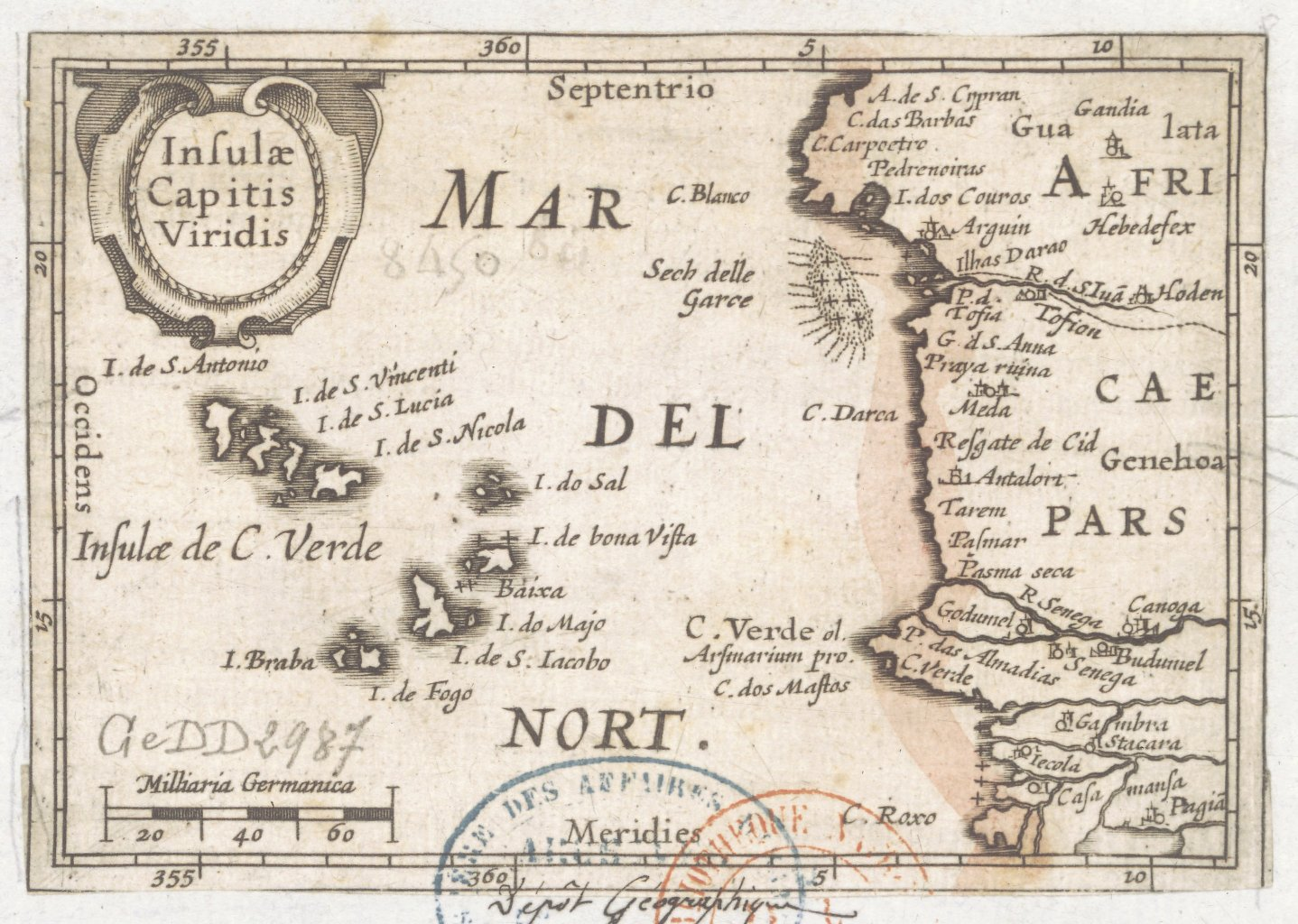
Insulae Capitis Viridis (1598), showing Cape Verde

The first islands formed, around 40–50 million years ago, were present-day Sal and its eastern neighbors. The western islands were formed later, including São Nicolau (as early as 11.8 million years ago), São Vicente (nine million years ago), present-day Santiago and Fogo (four million years ago), and Brava (two to three million years ago). Millions of years after the seamounts rose above the Atlantic, the first lizards, insects and plants came to the archipelago, possibly on ocean currents from the African mainland when the ocean's salinity was lower.

The archipelago experienced several large volcanic eruptions, including Praia Grande 4.5 million years ago, São Vicente (and, possibly, present-day Porto Grande) 300,000 years ago, and Topo da Coroa 200,000 years ago. 73,000 years old, in the east of present-day Fogo, Fogo's volcano flanks collapsed which caused a megatsunami of between 170-240m high, inundating coastal Santiago Island, Maio, and possibly Brava and part of the Barlavento Islands. The volcano on Fogo island remains active to this day. Its last eruption was in 2014.

During the last Ice Age, the sea level dropped to about 130 metres (430 ft) below its current level. Cape Verde's islands became slightly more broad, and there was a large island identified as Northwest Island. Santo Antão was one kilometer northwest of the island; Boa Vista and Maio were one island, and another island known as Nola (Ilha da Nola, northwest of Santo Antão) was about 80 to 90 metres (260 to 300 ft) meters above sea level. Before the end of the Ice Age, the Eastern Island (Ilha Occidental) split into three islands; one became submerged and is now the João Valente Reef, the Canal de São Vicente widened to provide 12 kilometres (7.5 mi) separation from Santo Antão, Nola Island was submerged and again became a seamount, and eastern Northwest Island broke up into São Vicente, the smaller Santa Luzia, and the two islets of Branco and Raso.

== Possible classical references ==
Cape Verde may have been referenced in De choreographia by Pomponius Mela and Historia naturalis by Pliny the Elder. Mela and Pliny called the islands "Gorgades", referring to the home of the mythical Gorgons killed by Perseus. In typical ancient euhemerism, they suggested the islands as the place where the Carthaginian Hanno the Navigator slew two female "Gorillai".

Pliny, citing the Greek writer Xenophon of Lampsacus, placed the Gorgades at two days' travel from "Hesperu Ceras" (the westernmost part of the African continent, today called Cap-Vert). As quoted by Gaius Julius Solinus, he also said that the voyage from the Gorgades to the Hesperides took around 40 days. The Isles of the Blessed, written about by Marinus of Tyre and referenced by Ptolemy in his Geographia, may have been the Cape Verde islands.

== Portuguese discovery and colonisation ==
Coat of arms of colonial Cape Verde

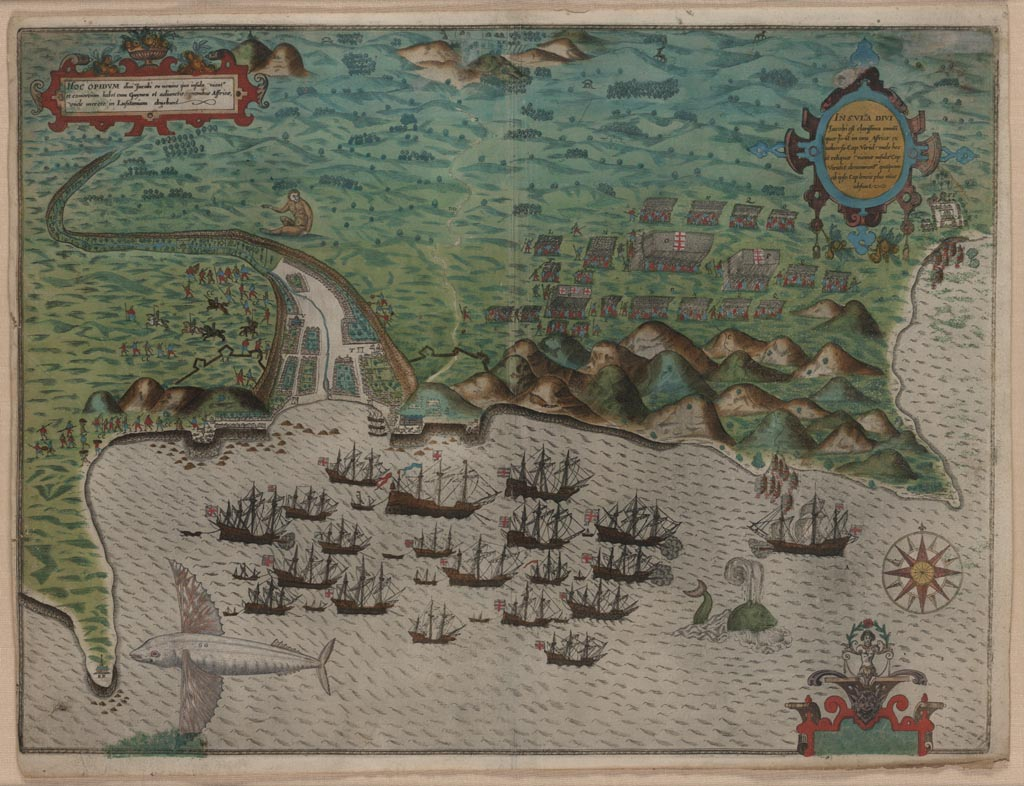
Sir Francis Drake at Santiago, Cape Verde; 1589 hand-colored engraving by Baptista Boazio

=== 15th and 16th centuries ===
In 1456, Alvise Cadamosto, Antoniotto Usodimare (Venetian and Genoese captains, respectively, in the service of Prince Henry the Navigator) and an unnamed Portuguese captain discovered some of the islands. During the next decade, Diogo Gomes and António de Noli (also captains in the service of Prince Henry) discovered the remaining islands of the archipelago. When they first landed in Cape Verde, the islands were barren of people but not of vegetation.

Prince Fernando, King Afonso V of Portugal's brother, was granted the archipelago as a fiefdom. The Portuguese established Ribeira Grande (present-day Cidade Velha) in 1462 on the island of São Tiago. This was the first permanent European settlement in the tropics. The first settlers included Portuguese, Genoese, and Flemish adventurers; reprieved convicts; and Sephardic Jews fleeing persecution. In 1466, with the settlement failing to attract enough settlers, Afonso gave the population trading rights in all of West Africa except Arguim. He rescinded this a few years later, when the monarchy began selling lucrative trade monopolies instead, but enterprising Cape Verdeans and Luso-Africans would still play a prominent role in the first centuries of European trade in the region, often in defiance of the Portuguese crown.

In Spain, the Reconquista was growing in its mission to conquer Iberia and expel the Muslims and Jews. In 1492, the Spanish Inquisition also emerged in its fullest expression of anti-Semitism. It spread to neighboring Portugal (as the Portuguese Inquisition), where King João II and Manuel I exiled thousands of Jews to São Tomé, Príncipe, and Cape Verde in 1496.

The Portuguese soon brought slaves from the West African coast. Positioned on trade routes between Africa, Europe, and the New World, the archipelago prospered from the transatlantic slave trade during the 16th century. Sao Tiago and Fogo hosted slave plantations growing sugar and cotton for shipment to Portugal, and producing panos (cotton cloth) for export to West Africa. Massive amounts of salt were produced on Maio, Boa Vista, and Sal, sold to cod fishermen. Horses were reared on Santiago and shipped to the African coast as well.

Settlements began to appear on other islands. São Filipe was founded in 1500; Ponta do Sol and Ribeira Grande were founded in the mid-16th century (when its first settlers also arrived in Madeira and Ribeira Brava on São Nicolau). Povoação Velha on Boa Vista, Furna, Nova Sintra on Brava, and Palmeira on Sal were later founded.

Cabo Verdean society at this period was deeply segregated and hierarchical. At the top were the peninsula-born Portuguese whites, mostly government officials, soldiers, and the upper clergy. The next group were the brancos da terra, the local whites, with the earliest settlers and their descendants, the morgados, chief among them. Free pardos (mulattos) and pretos (blacks) came next, and the escravos (slaves) were at the bottom.

The islands' prosperity encouraged sacking by pirates, particularly during the period of the Iberian Union 1580–1640, when Spain's enemies, the British, French, and Dutch, raided Portuguese colonies. Sir Francis Drake sacked Ribeira Grande in 1582, captured the island in 1585 and raided Cidade Velha, Praia and São Domingos.

=== 17th and 18th centuries ===
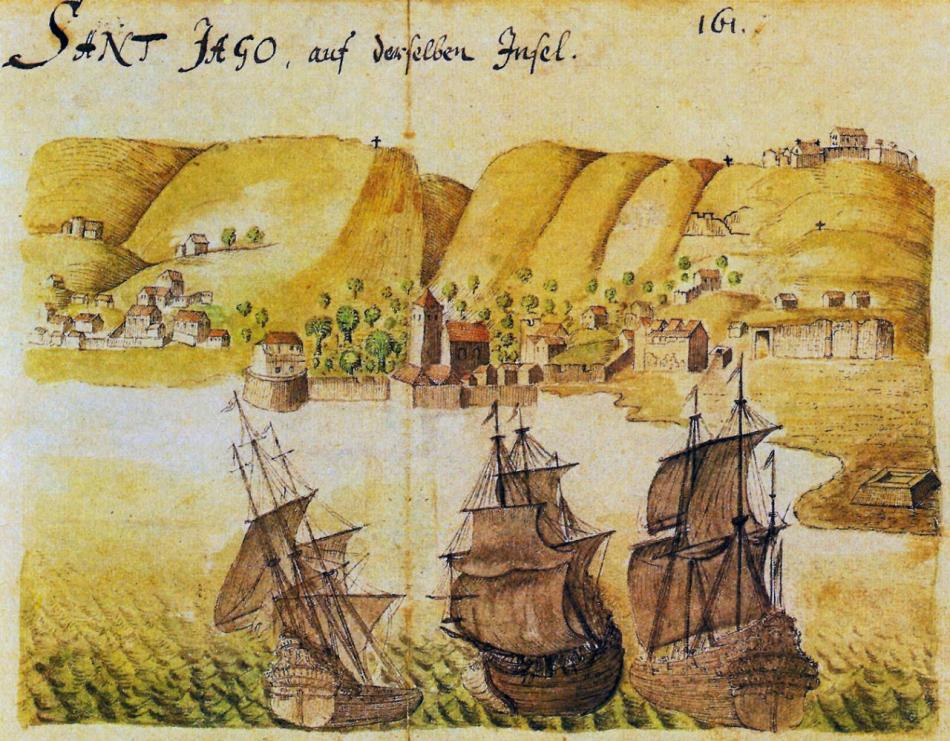
A 1646 watercolour of Cidade Velha by Caspar Schmalkalden

During the 17th century, Algerian corsairs established a base on the Cape Verde islands. They raided Madeira in 1617, stealing the church bells and taking 1,200 people captive.

Given the scarcity of capital for the region's development, the Portuguese Finance and Overseas Councils authorized the 1664 foundation of the Guinea Coast Company. The company aimed at the slave trade, ending individual tenancy and encouraging slave companies. The Company of Cacheu and Rivers and Commerce of Guinea, which operated between 1676 and 1682, was succeeded by the Company of Cacheu and Cape Verde in 1690.

Pico do Fogo erupted in 1680, which resulted in the movement of the population to Brava and other regions (including Brazil). For a few years, the volcano was a natural lighthouse for sailors. The latter decades of the 17th century also saw the first emigration flows from the islands to North America. Whales abounded in the waters around Cape Verde, and whaling ships from Massachusetts and Rhode Island recruited local crewmen who knew the currents and weather from the islands of Brava and Fogo. These outflows would continue for centuries.

As a result of the 1712 French Cassard expedition in which Ribeira Grande was destroyed, the capital was partially moved to Praia. With the Portuguese increasingly sidelined in Atlantic trade, Cape Verde became a poor backwater. By 1740, the island was a supply point for American slave ships and whalers. This began a stream of male immigration to the American colonies. Praia, with its natural harbor, became the permanent capital in 1770 as the plantation economy diminished in importance relative to trade and naval supply.

In 1747, the islands were hit with the first of several droughts and famines which have plagued them ever since at average five-year intervals. The situation was made worse by deforestation and overgrazing, which destroyed the ground vegetation that provided moisture. Three major droughts during the 18th and 19th centuries resulted in well over 100,000 people starving to death. The Portuguese government sent little relief during the droughts.

In 1758 the Grão Pará and Maranhão Company was granted a 20-year monopoly on all trade in Cape Verde and the West African coast. Its agents ruthlessly exploited the islands' inhabitants, commandeering panos, liquor, food, and other supplies regardless of droughts and famines. Many were recruited for service in Guinea. Construction of the Fortaleza de São José da Amura in Bissau cost more than 2,600 lives, most of them Cabo Verdean laborers. Textiles were smuggled and sold on the black market. Between 1766 and 1776, 95,000 "barafulas" (Cape Verdean textiles) were imported to the Guinean coast.

Pico do Fogo again erupted in 1769. This was the last time it erupted from the top, although it also erupted in 1785 and 1799. Another famine, affecting Brava and Fogo, began in 1774; 20,000 people starved. Fogo's population dropped from 5,700 to 4,200 around 1777. The company's mismanagement made the situation worse, as they sold desperately needed food and raised the prices of what little was available. In 1778 the monopoly ended, and the Portuguese created the province of Cabo Verde e Guine.

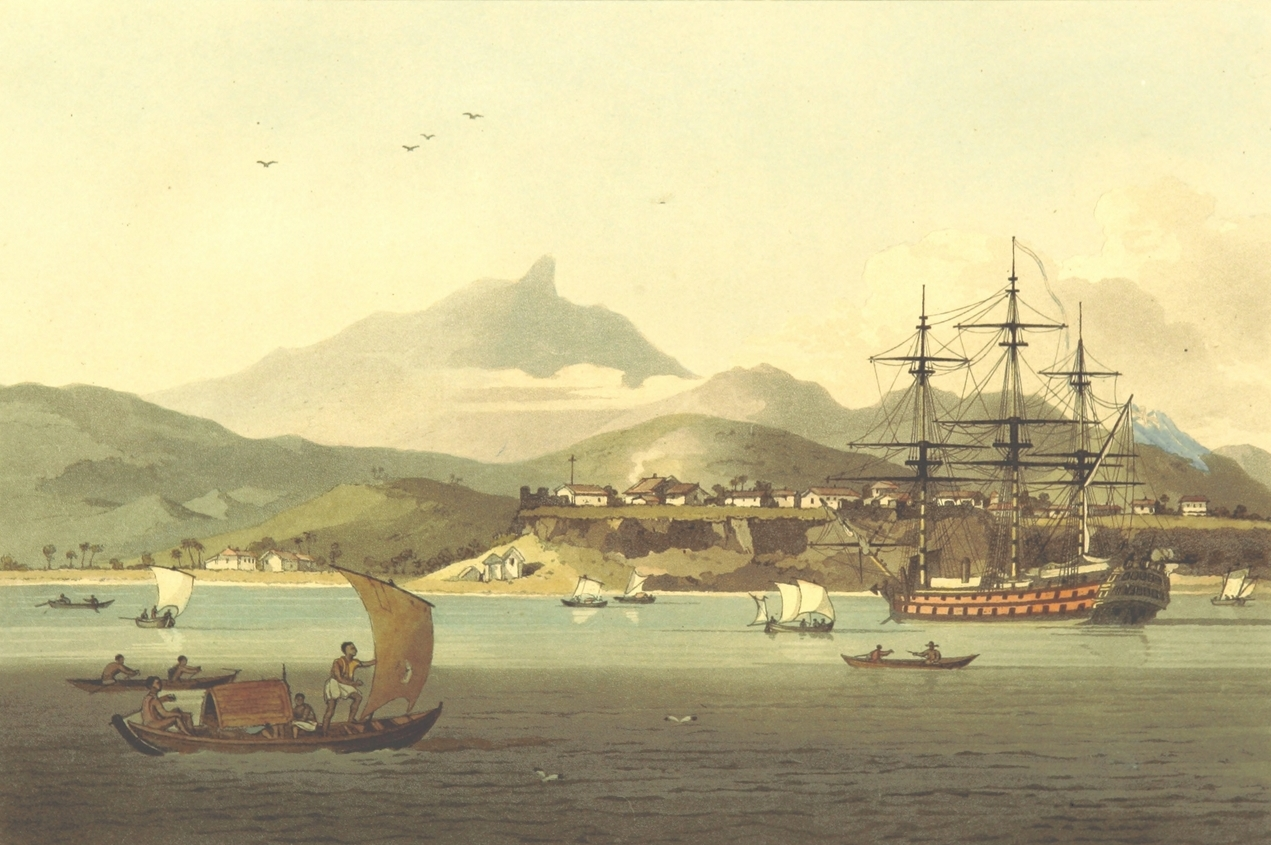
Porto Praya in 1792

Although Portugal was neutral in the American Revolutionary War, the British and French navies fought the Battle of Porto Praya off Praia on 16 April 1781.

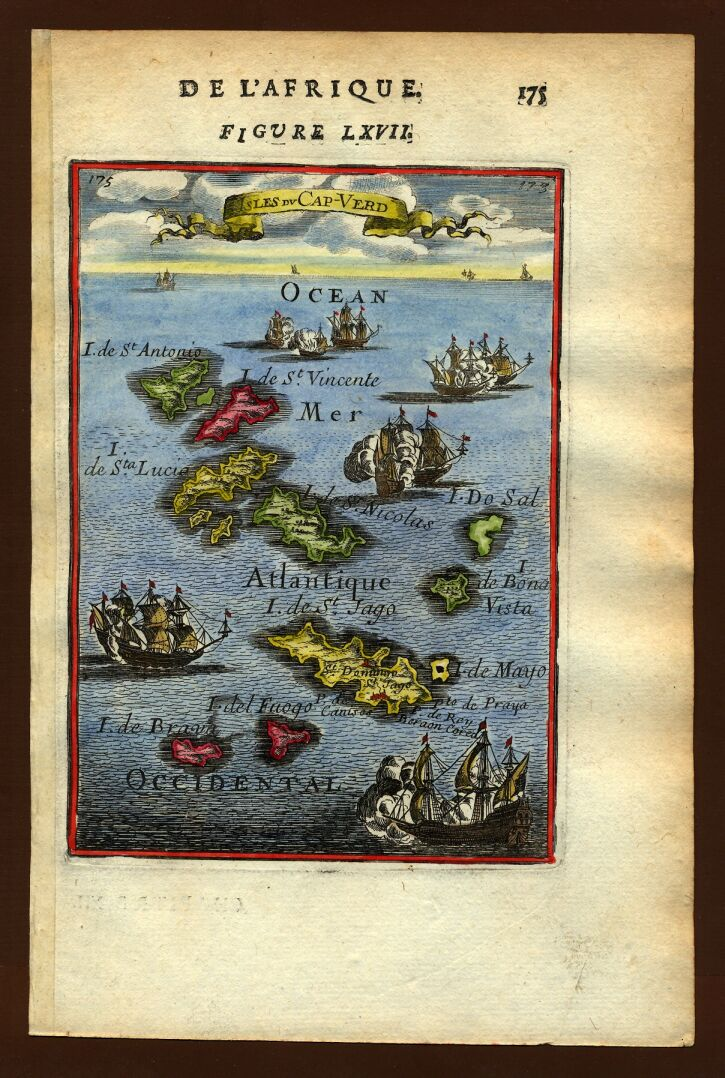
1683 map of the Cape Verde islands

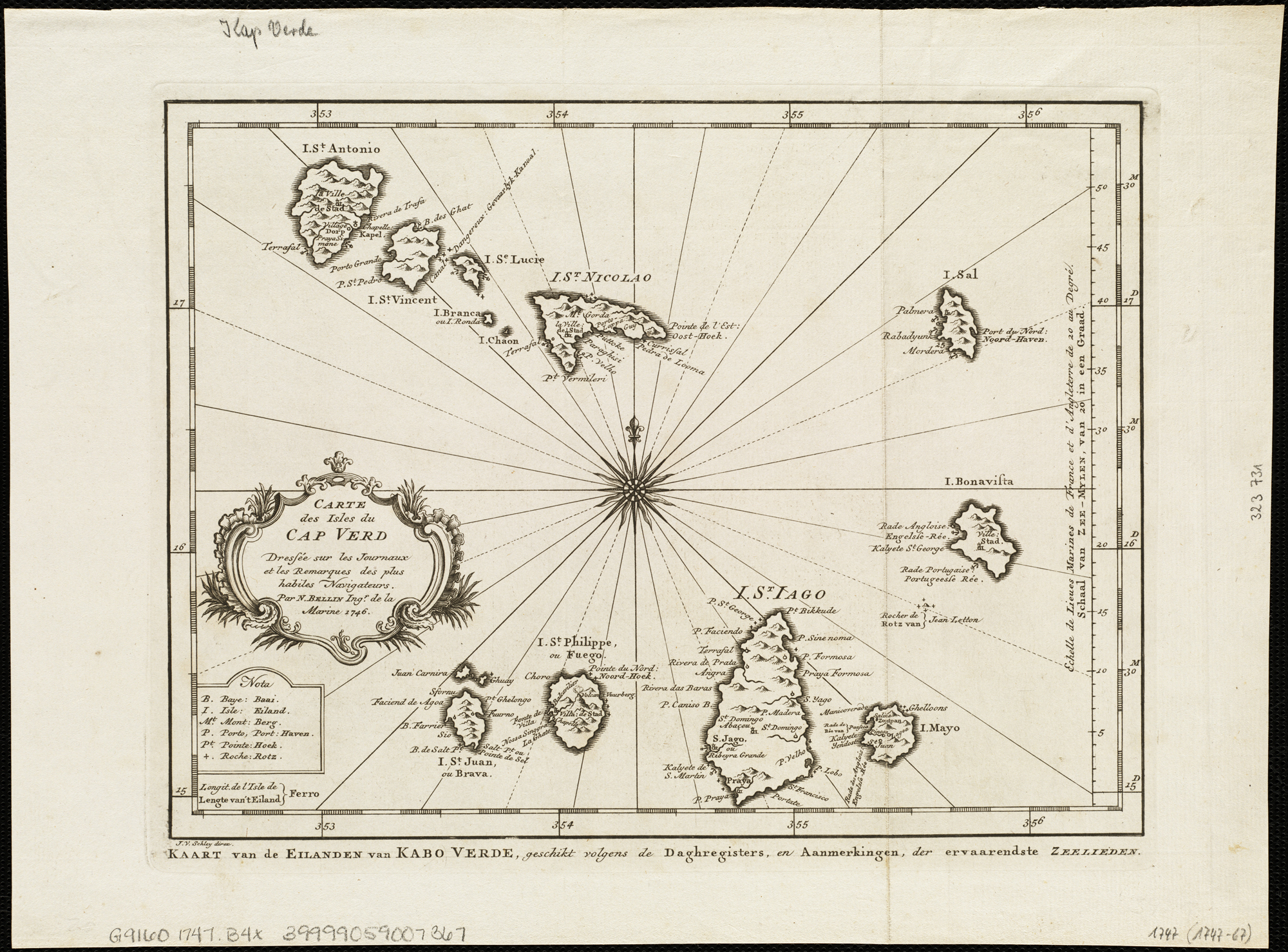
1747 French-Dutch map of Cape Verde by Jacques Nicolas Bellin

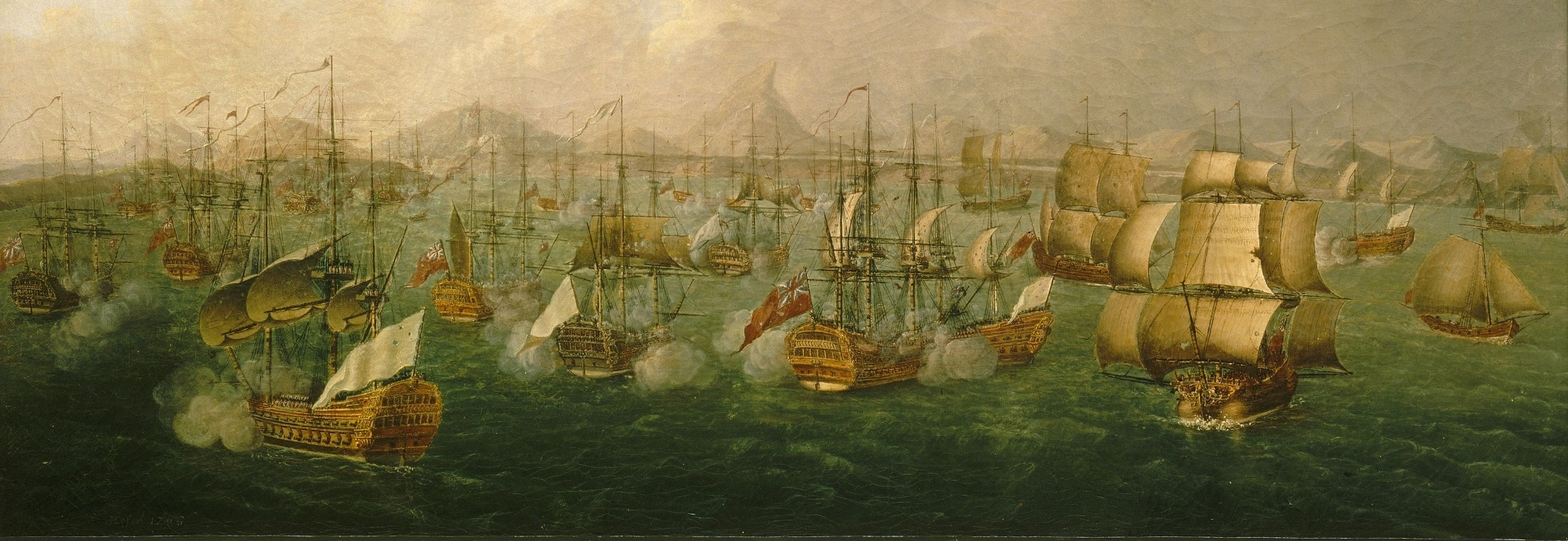
The 1781 battle of Porto Praya by Marquis de Rossel

=== 19th century ===
Mindelo (originally Nossa Senhora da Luz) was founded in 1795, Pedra de Lume on Sal in 1799, and Santa Maria in early 1830 on the same island. Praia (the colonial capital) was modernized in 1822, expanding northward.

In the aftermath of the Liberal Revolution of 1820, slave trader Manuel António Martins used the unrest to form a junta with other leading civilians, driving the governor out and ruling the islands until 1823. Martins was officially appointed prefect of the province in 1833. Soon after he took office, he disbanded the branco-dominated militias. When, in 1835, some conservative officers in the local garrison mutinied, the disaffected brancos accused Martins of abetting the plot and arrested him. A new governor, Joaquim Pereira Marinho, arrived in September to restore order. He attempted to start local fishing companies, where previously Cape Verdean had been banned from owning boats for fear of slaves escaping, but his successor cancelled the project.

The British established a station in Mindelo to refuel ships with coal, water, and other supplies beginning in 1839, and the city flourished. Two attempts to move the colonial capital from Praia were made: a plan to move to Picos in 1831 when another famine struck Cape Verde, and Mindelo was proposed in 1838. Many people did not want to move the colonial capital, and it remained in Praia. Two submarine telegraph cables were linked in 1874 to Pernambuco, Brazil and to Cameroon via Bathurst in the Gambia in 1885.

The system of morgados was abolished in 1863, and slavery in 1864, but much of the population remained dependent on their former masters, renting or sharecropping land. The decline of the slave trade dealt a blow to Cape Verde's economy. The shipping traffic at Mindelo, however, served as an important engine of economic activity. Ships plying the South Atlantic to and from Africa and Asia stopped at Mindelo for coal, salt, meat, water, and wine imported from Madeira and the Azores. In 1890 a total of 156 ships unloaded 657,633,588 metric tons of coal there, and the port was visited by 2,264 ships carrying 344,907 persons.

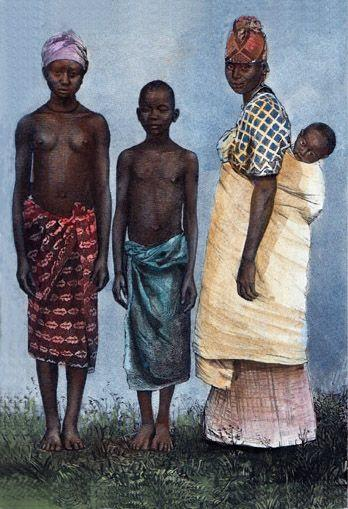
Cape Verdeans in 1885

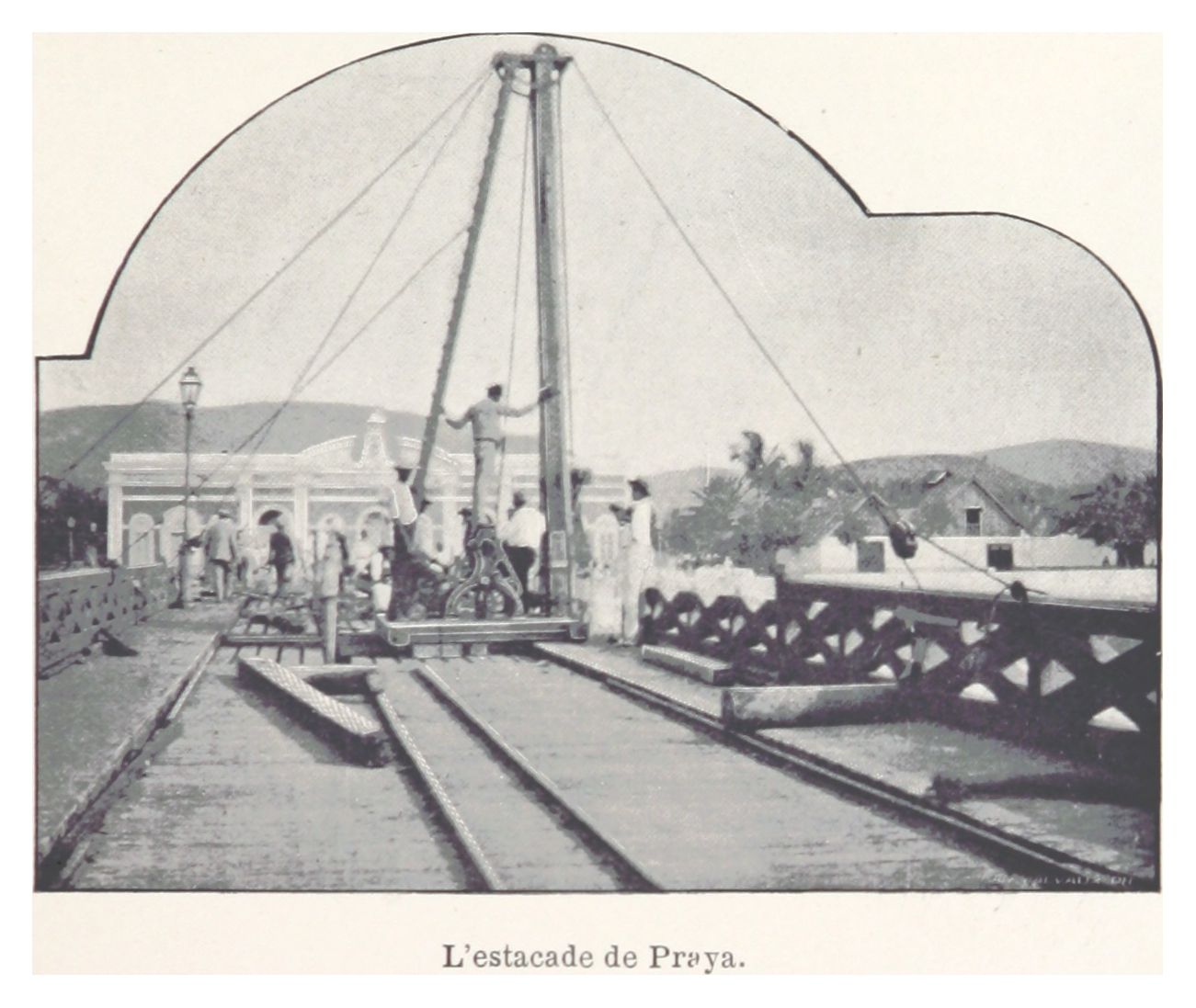
Port of Praia, 1899

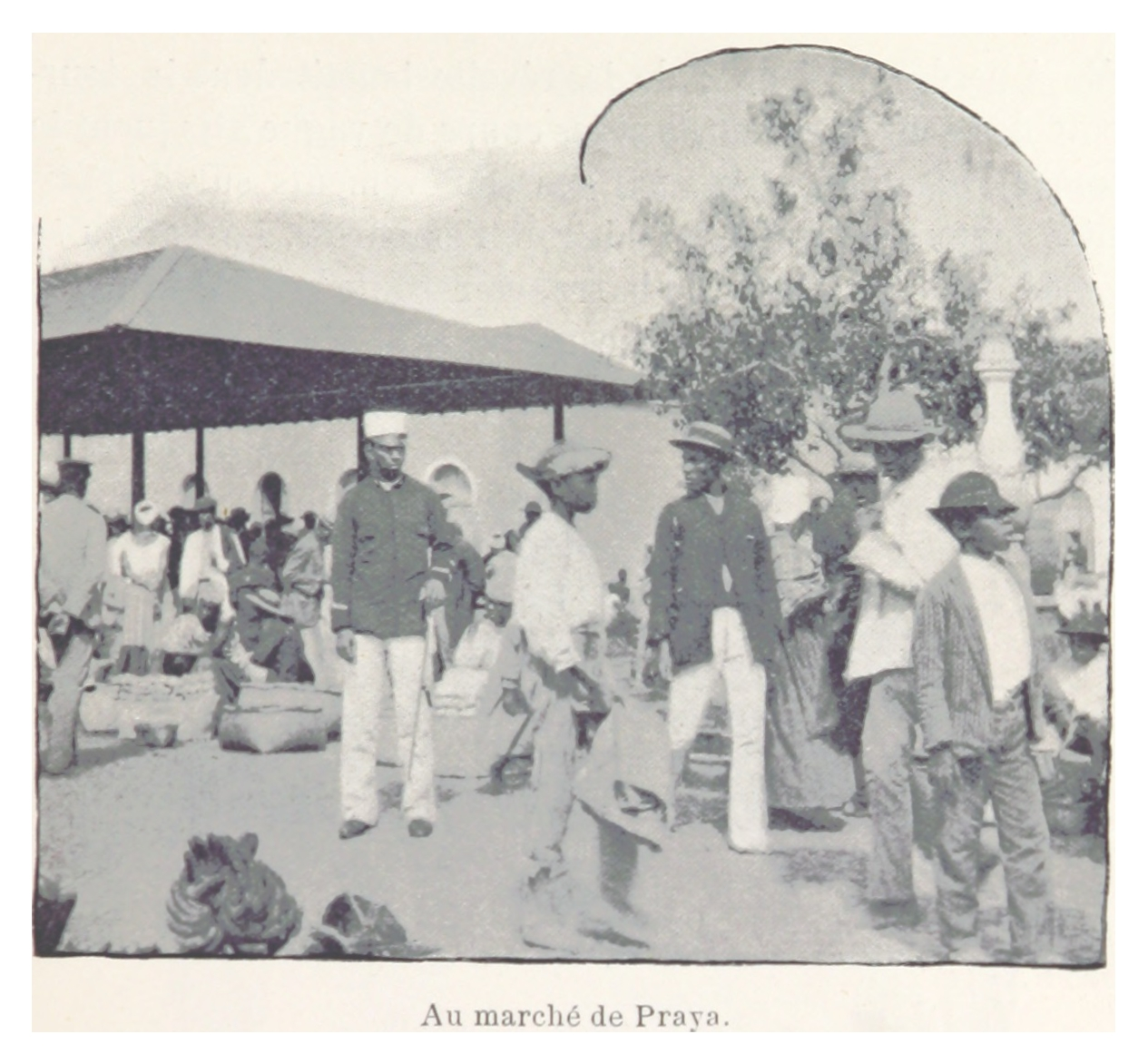
Praia market, 1899

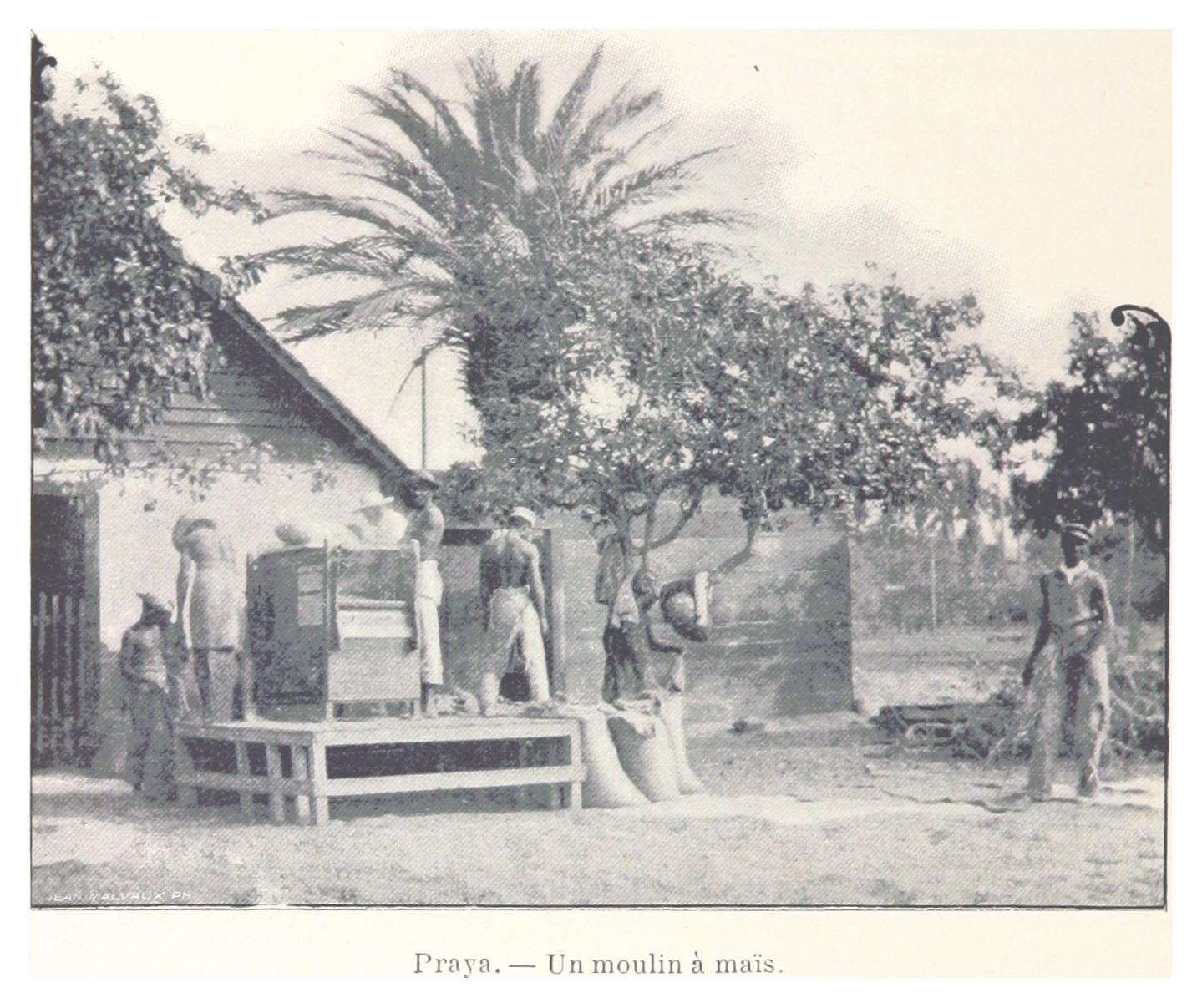
Praia maize mill, 1899

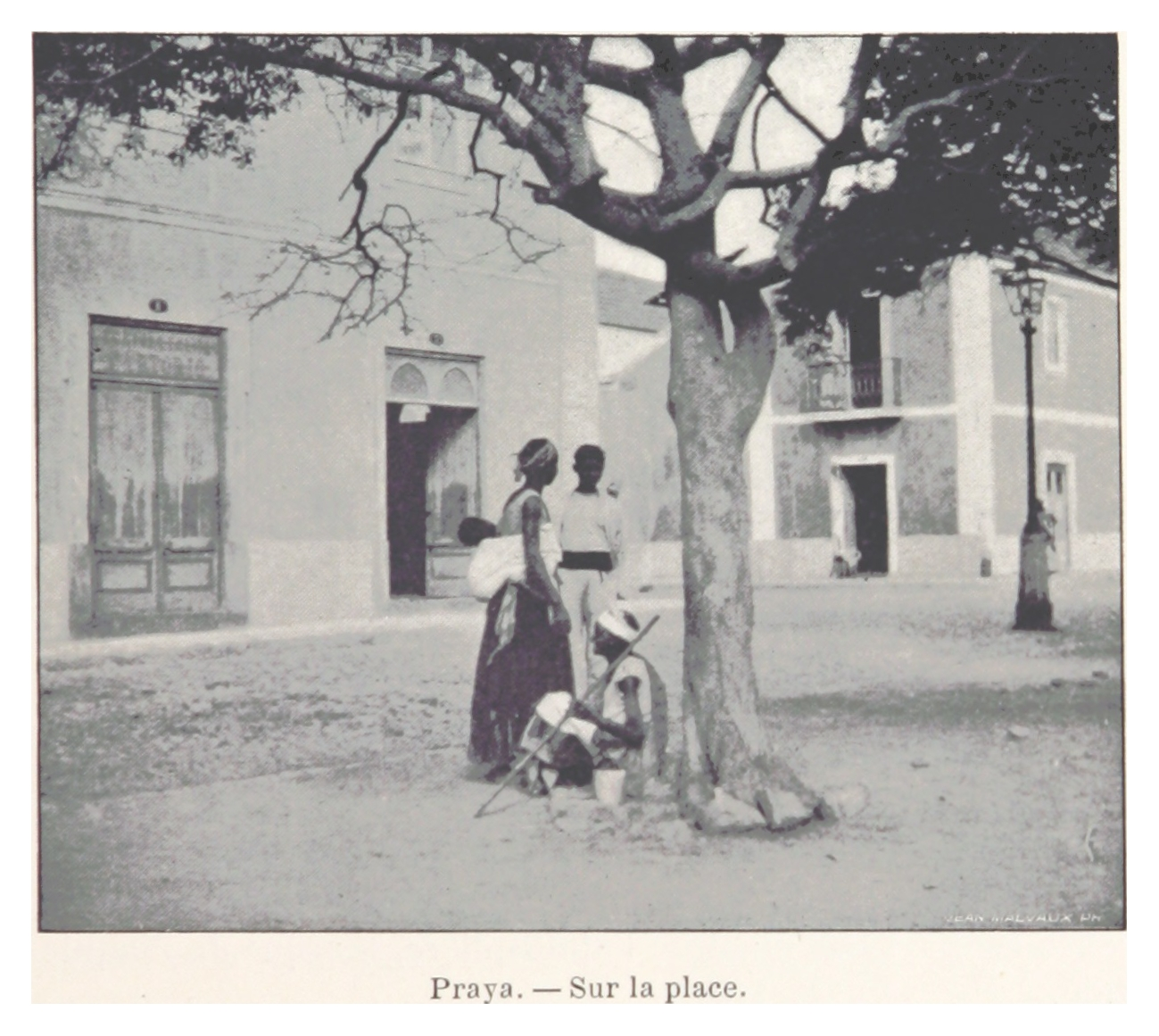
Square in Praia, 1899

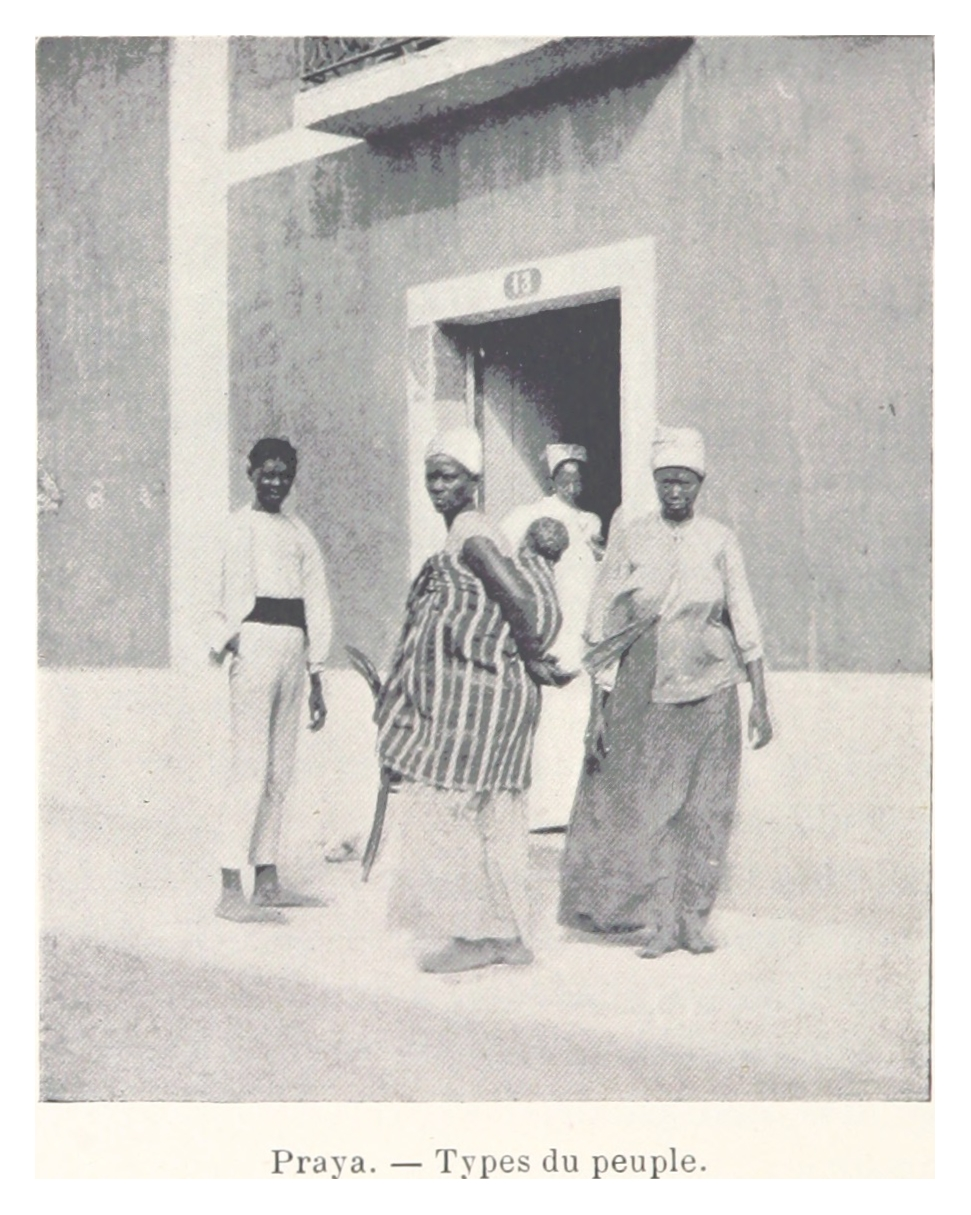
Praia in 1899

=== 20th century ===
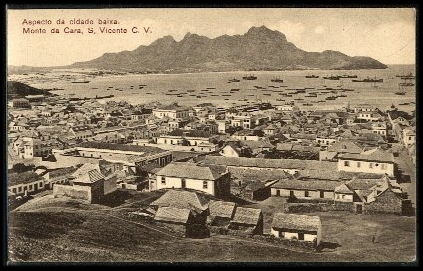
Postcard photo of Mindelo

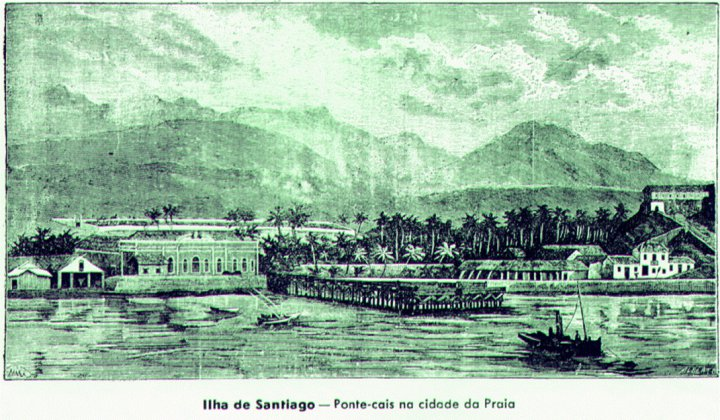
Praia in 1936

Throughout much of the 20th century, the colonial government organized forced emigration to supply "contract" labor for Portugal's tropical colonies. Between 1900 and 1970, particularly during periods of famine when people were desperate, some 80,000 Cabo Verdeans were shipped to the plantations of Sao Tome e Principe, and more than 7,000 to Angola and Mozambique.

Mindelo became the most-used transatlantic telegraph station in 1912. A total of 669 ships were refueled each year at the port, reaching 1,927 ships a decade later. When gasoline began to be used as fuel, however, Mindelo could not rival the improved port facilities of Las Palmas on Grand Canary or nearby Dakar in Senegal. The Suez Canal had also rerouted much of the maritime traffic out of the south Atlantic. The use of coal declined, leading to a coal strike in 1912 due to insufficient work. When the Great Depression began in 1930, ship activity ended.

Two of Cabo Verde's worst-ever famines occurred in 1941–43 and 1947–48, killing an estimated 45,000 people. The massive disaster was not reported in the Portuguese press, and no food aid was sent, due to World War II. Half the population of Fogo perished. Portuguese authorities forbade reporting on the deaths or even the use of the word "famine."

Espargos, in the centre of the island of Sal was founded in the late 1940s as the last Portuguese airport town. From 1950 to 1970, the number of flights increased. Espargos became an important stop for Alitalia's Portuguese-Brazilian flights and South African Airways' (SAA) 1967 flights between London and Johannesburg. The airline had to use the airport because to the international boycott of South Africa due to its apartheid policy.

In 1952, the Portuguese government planned to transfer over 10,000 settlers to the island of São Tomé in São Tomé and Príncipe (another Portuguese colony) to work on plantations. Africans came primarily from the islands of São Nicolau, Santiago, Santo Antão, Fogo, and Brava. When the two colonies became independent, many people left for Europe and the United States, and few returned to Cape Verde. Several famines occurred at this time due to poor harvests, the Second World War, and a poor response from the Portuguese colonial administration. Until and during the Portuguese Colonial War, those planning and fighting in the armed conflict in Portuguese Guinea often linked the liberation of Guinea-Bissau to liberation in Cape Verde; in 1956, Amílcar and Luís Cabral founded the African Party for the Independence of Guinea and Cape Verde.

=== Independence movement ===
Although Cape Verde was neglected by Portugal, Portuguese treatment of Cape Verdeans was differed from their treatment of other colonized peoples; the people of Cape Verde fared slightly better than Africans in other Portuguese colonies because of their lighter skin. A small minority received an education, and Cape Verde was the first African-Portuguese colony to have an institution of higher education. By the time of independence, one-quarter of the population could read (compared to five percent in Portuguese Guinea, present-day Guinea-Bissau).

Literate Cape Verdeans became aware of the pressures for independence which were building on the mainland. The islands continued experiencing droughts, famines, epidemics and volcanic eruptions amid Portuguese government indifference. Thousands of people died of starvation during the first half of the 20th century. Although the nationalist movement appeared less fervent in Cape Verde than in Portugal's other African holdings, the African Party for the Independence of Guinea and Cape Verde (Partido Africano da Independência da Guiné e Cabo Verde, or PAIGC) was founded in 1956 by Amílcar Cabral and other pan-Africanists. Many Cape Verdeans fought for independence in Guinea-Bissau.

In 1926, Portugal had become a rightist dictatorship which regarded the colonies as an economic frontier to be developed in the interest of Portugal and the Portuguese. Famines, unemployment, poverty, and the failure of the Portuguese government to address those issues caused resentment, but Portuguese dictator António de Oliveira Salazar did not want to give up his colonies as easily as other European colonial powers had given up theirs.

After World War II, Portugal was intent on holding onto its former colonies (known since 1951 as overseas territories). When most former African colonies gained independence between 1957 and 1964, the Portuguese still held on. After the Pijiguiti Massacre, however, the people of Cape Verde and Guinea-Bissau fought one of the longest African liberation wars.

Like other colonies, autonomy was granted in 1972 and Portuguese Cape Verde held its only parliamentary elections in 1973 in which only Portuguese citizens could vote. Only 25,521 people registered to vote out of a total population of 272,071, and a total of 20,942 people voted. The Portuguese constitution banned political parties at the time, and most of the candidates were put forward by the ruling People's National Action movement; some civic associations, however, were allowed to nominate candidates.

After the 25 April 1974 Carnation Revolution, Cape Verde became more autonomous but continued to have an overseas governor until that post became a high commissioner. Widespread unrest forced the government to negotiate with the PAIGC, and agreements for an independent Cape Verde were on the table. Pedro Pires (at the time still in Algeria) signed an agreement at the end of August that year to give Portuguese Guinea and Cape Verde both paths to independence, with the islands planned to hold a referendum on such in the near future. However, such referendum never ended up being scheduled, with the PAIGC renouncing the agreement by the next February as they established their government on the islands, asking for immediate independence without a referendum instead. On 5 July in Praia, Portuguese Prime Minister Vasco Gonçalves transferred power to National Assembly President Abilio Duarte. The colonial history of Cape Verde ended when Cape Verde become independent, a negotiated transfer, and one of the few Portuguese African colonies to achieve independence without guerilla fighting within its borders.

== After independence (1975) ==
=== One-party rule ===
Immediately after a November 1980 coup in Guinea-Bissau (Portuguese Guinea declared independence in 1973 and was granted de jure independence in 1974), relations between the two countries became strained. Cape Verde abandoned its hope for unity with Guinea-Bissau, and formed the African Party for the Independence of Cape Verde (PAICV).

Under PAICV leadership, Cape Verde witnessed a left-wing political agenda. The government oversaw a successful literacy program (though illiteracy was not entirely eliminated), democratic local elections for regional councils for both PAICV and independent candidates, as well as a work programme to tackle the impoverished country known as FAIMO (Frente de Alta Intensidade de Mão-de-Obra). Under FAIMO, jobs were created in rural residents on the islands via general infrastructure construction, thus providing more support to impoverished areas and providing well-paying jobs to the unemployed. The maritime sector was built up, including companies that were publicly owned such as EMPA (Empresa Pública de Abastecimento), thus improving transportation quality for supplies and food between islands, creating a government system of importing and exporting goods, and built the nation's economy.

Responding to growing pressure for a political opening, the PAICV called an emergency congress in February 1990 to discuss proposed constitutional changes to end one-party rule. Opposition groups came together to form the Movement for Democracy (MpD) in Praia in April of that year, and campaigned for the right to contest the presidential election scheduled for December 1990. The one-party state was abolished on 28 September of that year, and the first multi-party elections were held in January 1991.

=== End of one-party rule ===
The MpD won a majority of the seats in the National Assembly. MpD presidential candidate António Mascarenhas Monteiro defeated the PAICV candidate, 73.5 percent to 26.5 percent. Legislative elections in December 1995 increased the MpD majority in the National Assembly, where the party held 50 of its 72 seats. A February 1996 presidential election returned Monteiro to office.

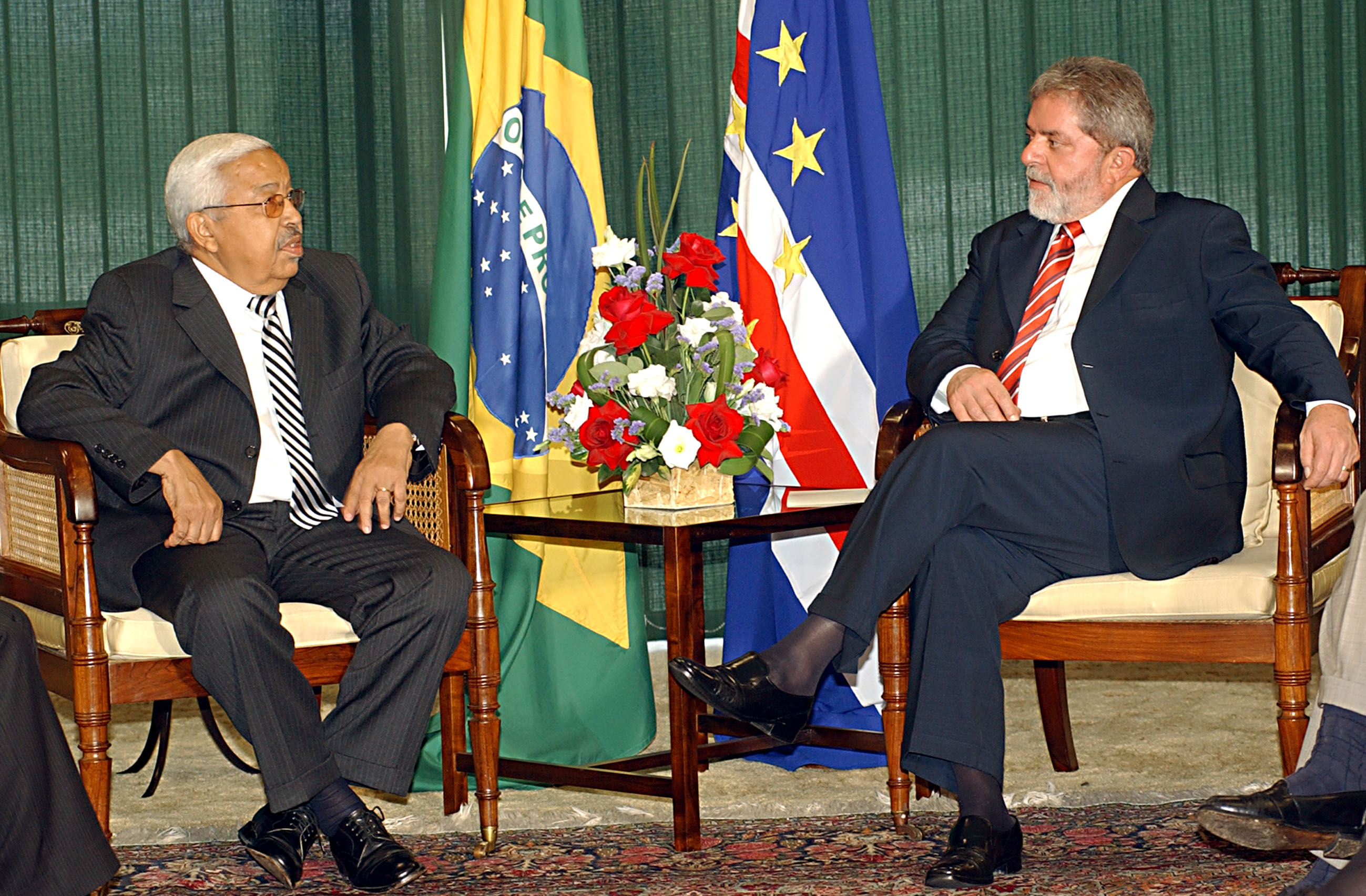
President of Cape Verde Pedro Pires and President of Brazil Luiz Inácio Lula da Silva, October 2005

In the presidential election campaign of 2000 and 2001, two former prime ministers (Pedro Pires and Carlos Veiga) were the main candidates. Pires was prime minister during the PAICV regime; Veiga was prime minister during most of Monteiro's presidency, stepping aside to campaign. In what might have been one of the closest races in electoral history, Pires won by 12 votes; he and Veiga each received nearly half the votes. Pires was narrowly re-elected in the 2006 elections.

Jorge Carlos Almeida Fonseca, President of Cape Verde since 2011, was re-elected in October 2016. Fonseca was supported by the Movement for Democracy (MpD). MpD leader Ulisses Correia e Silva has been prime minister since the 2016 elections, when his party ousted the ruling PAICV for the first time in 15 years. In April 2021, the ruling party, led by Prime Minister Jose Ulisses Correia e Silva, maintained its parliamentary majority in the election.

In October 2021, opposition candidate and former prime minister Jose Maria Neves of PAICV won Cape Verde's presidential election. On 9 November of that year, Neves was sworn in as president.

On 2 February 2024, Cape Verde became the third African country to be free of malaria.

== See also ==
- History of Africa
- History of Guinea-Bissau
- History of West Africa
- List of prime ministers of Cape Verde
- List of presidents of Cape Verde
- Politics of Cape Verde
