= José Maria Neves =

President of Cape Verde since 2021

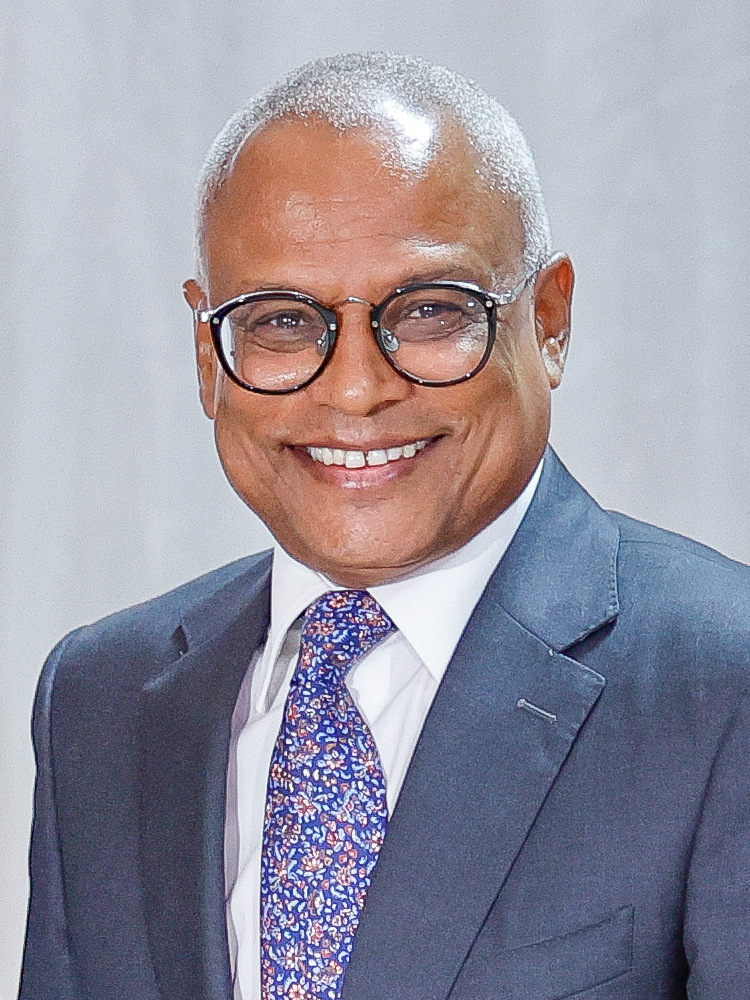
- Neves in 2023

5th President of Cape Verde
- Incumbent
- Assumed office 9 November 2021 (Note: Neves has suspended his presidential powers during his re-election campaign, with the President of the National Assembly, Janira Hopffer Almada, exercising them from 15 September 2026 to 15 November 2026.)
- Prime Minister: Ulisses Correia e Silva; Francisco Carvalho
- Preceded by: Jorge Carlos Fonseca

4th Prime Minister of Cape Verde
- In office 1 February 2001 – 22 April 2016
- President: António Mascarenhas Monteiro; Pedro Pires; Jorge Carlos Fonseca
- Preceded by: Gualberto do Rosário
- Succeeded by: Ulisses Correia e Silva

Personal details
- Born: José Maria Pereira Neves; 28 March 1960 (age 66) Santa Catarina, Portuguese Cape Verde
- Party: African Party for the Independence of Cape Verde
- Spouse: Débora Katisa Carvalho
- Education: Getúlio Vargas Foundation

José Maria Pereira Neves (Portuguese: [ʒuˈzɛ mɐˈɾiɐ pɨˈɾejɾɐ ˈnɛvɨʃ]; born 28 March 1960) is a Cape Verdean politician who is currently the president of Cape Verde, having previously served as the Prime Minister of Cape Verde from 2001 to 2016. He is a member of the African Party for the Independence of Cape Verde (PAICV). In the 2021 presidential election, he was elected with 51.7% of votes, beating his nearest rival Carlos Veiga who got 42.4% of the total votes.

== Biography ==
Neves was born on the island of Santiago in 1960. He became interested in the politics of Cape Verde as a teenager and was the leader of a nationalist youth organization during the country's transition from Portuguese rule to independence and democracy in 1975. Part of his higher education was at the São Paulo School of Business Administration of the Getúlio Vargas Foundation in Brazil.

He returned to Cape Verde in the 1980s and worked as a clerk in different state institutions. From 1987 to 1989, he was coordinator of the Project Administrative and Reform and Modernization. From 1988 to 1988, he was director of the National Training Centre for Public Administration. From 1989 to 1998, he was consultant in the field of National Training and Development of Human Resources Management.

=== Political career ===
In 1989, he became member of the PAICV party. As a candidate for the party leadership at PAICV's September 1997 congress, he faced Pedro Pires; Pires defeated Neves in the leadership election, winning 68% of the vote. In May 2000, Neves—then serving as President of the Santa Catarina Town Council—announced that he would seek the PAICV presidency again at the June 2000 party congress; Pires was leaving the PAICV presidency in anticipation of his candidacy in the next year's national presidential election.

After he became prime minister, he established diplomatic relations with the People's Republic of China. In 2002, he signed a "special treaty" with the European Union, announced on 15 November 2005. In 2007, he called for a special relationship with the European Union due to the archipelago's proximity to the other islands of Macaronesia, which are regions of Spain and Portugal. A meeting with the Community of Portuguese Language Countries (CPLP) was held in November 2002. He also met Alamara Nhassé, Prime Minister of Guinea-Bissau. He held additional portfolio of Minister of Finance from 2003 to 2004.

In August 2005, he visited Brazil, where he toured six states and had an audience with President Lula da Silva. A topic of discussion was investment in Cape Verde, including in the University of Cape Verde, the first public university in the archipelago.

He won the 2006 parliamentary election on 22 January with 52.28% of the vote, with his party taking 41 seats. and on 7 March, he served his second term as prime minister. The World Bank and the IMF judged the country favorably on its economic and financial policies.

While acknowledging the harmful effects of slavery and colonialism on Africa, Neves said in December 2006 that African leaders were primarily responsible for the continent's present-day problems, and that they "must assume their responsibility to develop a clear strategy for Africa's future that takes advantage of all of its human capabilities and natural resources."

On 2 January 2007, he voiced his intentions to give Cape Verde a special status with ECOWAS.

A new government under Neves was announced on 27 June 2008, with six ministers joining the government and four ministers leaving it. Three of the new ministers were women, making it the first government in Cape Verde with a female majority (eight out of 15 portfolios).

On 6 February 2011, he was elected to his third term, with 52.68% over MpD and 38 out of 72 seats, thus reinforcing his party's influence in the Cape Verdean parliament.

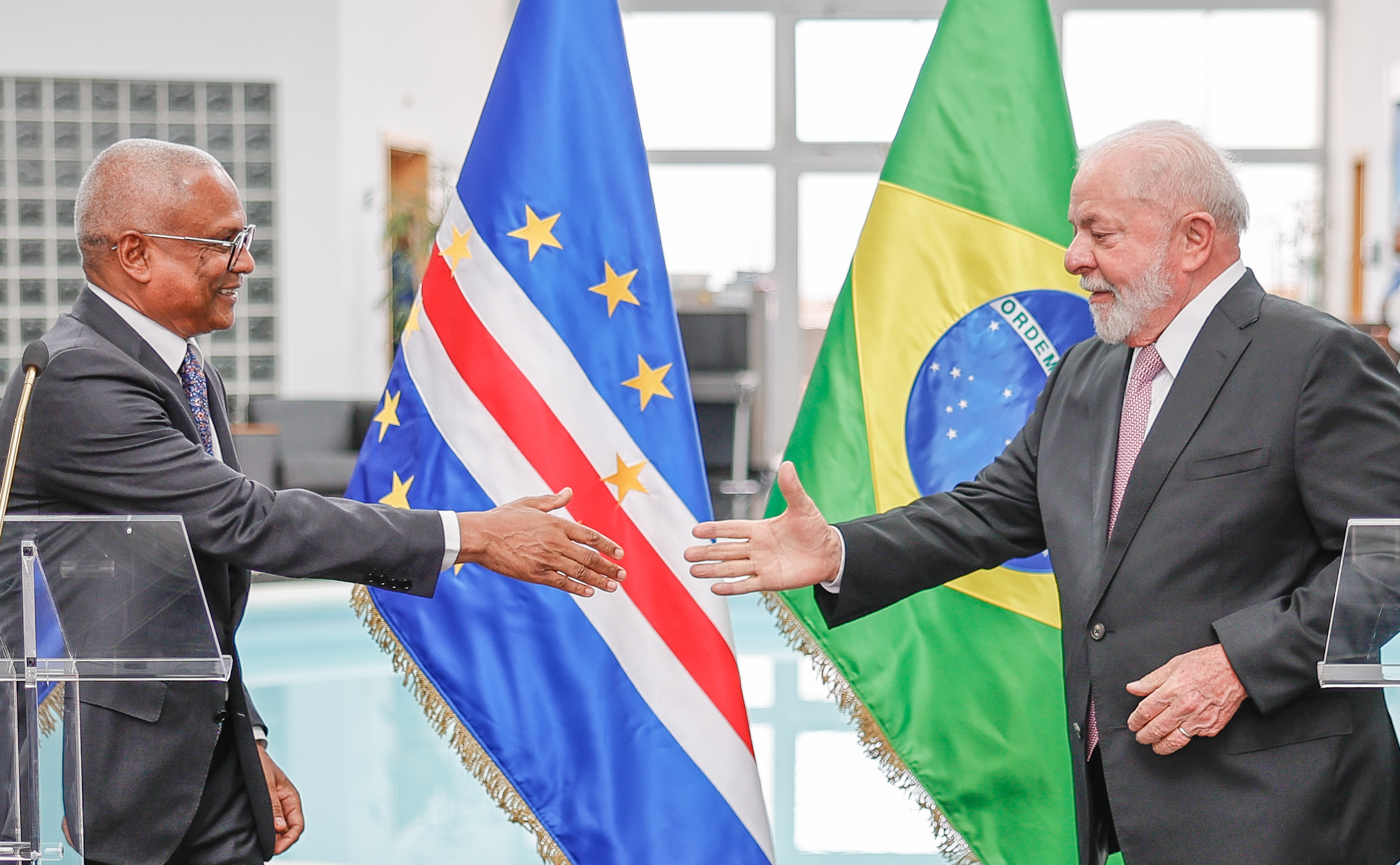
Neves with Brazilian President Luiz Inácio Lula da Silva on 19 July 2023

He visited a trading conference, the 4th Global Review of Aid for Trade in from 8 to 10 July 2013.

On 6 September 2014, he announced another government. Janira Hopffer Almada succeeded Neves as president of the parliamentary section of the PAICV party. After the 2016 parliamentary elections on 22 April, he was succeeded by Ulisses Correia e Silva as prime minister.

In 2021, Neves won the presidential election in the first round on 17 October. According to the first results published on an official website, he won 51.5% of the vote, fulfilling an absolute majority necessary to be elected in the first round. He was reelected in 2026 with a majority of 63.8% in the first round on 15 November.

=== As a writer ===
Neves is also author of books and some news articles. Some of these were published in other African countries and in parts of Europe and in Brazil. He wrote:

- Ensaios sobre la Administrativa de la Ciência Política (Essays on the Administrative of Political Sciences)
- A Teória de la Administração Pública em Cabo Verde (A Theory on Public Administration in Cape Verde)
- Princípios sobre a Administração Pública em Cabo Verde no Século XXI (Principles on Public Administration in Cape Verde in the 21st Century)
- O Estado e a Administração Pública em Cabo Verde (The State and the Public Administration in Cape Verde)
- Administração Pública no Concelho do Santa Catarina (Public Administration in the Municipality of Santa Catarina)
- O Estado na Era da Modernização no Cabo Verde. (The State in the Modernization Age in Cape Verde)
- Uma Agenda de Transformação para Cabo Verde (A Transformation Agenda for Cape Verde)
- Cabo Verde - Gestão das Impossibilidades (Cape Verde - Management of Impossibilities)
- Um Futuro a Construir, em co-autoria com Francisco Pinto Balsemão. (A Future to Build), with Francisco Pinto Balsemão as the co-author

== Honours ==
=== Foreign honours ===
- Luxembourg:
  - Knight of the Order of the Gold Lion of the House of Nassau (23 May 2023)
- Portugal:
  - Grand Collar of the Order of Prince Henry (28 July 2022)
- Senegal:
  - Grand Cross of the National Order of the Lion (2022)

== Notes ==
Political offices
Preceded by Gualberto do Rosário	Prime Minister of Cape Verde; 2001–2016	Succeeded by Ulisses Correia e Silva
Preceded by Jorge Carlos Fonseca	President of Cape Verde; 2021–present	Incumbent
