= List of presidents of Cape Verde =

President of the Republic of Cabo Verde
- Presidente da República de Cabo Verde (Portuguese)
- National emblem of Cape Verde

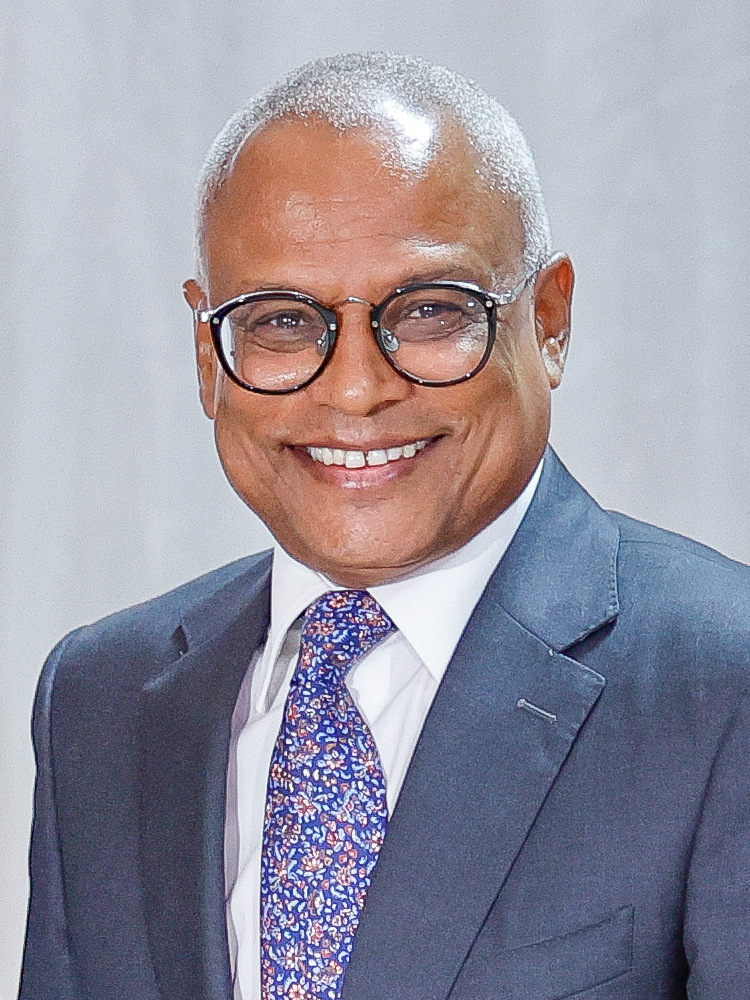
- Incumbent; José Maria Neves since 9 November 2021
- Executive branch of the Government of Cape Verde
- Type: Head of state Commander-in-chief
- Residence: Presidential Palace, Praia
- Term length: Five years, renewable once
- Constituting instrument: Constitution of Cape Verde (1980)
- Formation: 8 July 1975; 51 years ago
- First holder: Aristides Pereira
- Website: presidencia.cv

This article lists the presidents of Cape Verde, an island country in the Atlantic Ocean off the coast of West Africa, since the establishment of the office of president in 1975. Aristides Pereira was the first person to hold the office, taking effect on 8 July 1975. The incumbent is José Maria Neves, having taken office on 9 November 2021.

== Term limits ==
As of 2021, there is a two-term limit for the president in the Constitution of Cape Verde. The first president for whom the term limits applied was Monteiro in 2001.

== List of officeholders ==
Political parties

African Party for the Independence of Guinea and Cape Verde (PAIGC)
African Party for the Independence of Cape Verde (PAICV)
Movement for Democracy (MpD)

| No. | Portrait | Name (Birth–Death) | Term of office | | | Political party | Elected | Ref. |
| No. | Portrait | Name (Birth–Death) | Took office | Left office | Time in office | Political party | Elected | Ref. |
|---|---|---|---|---|---|---|---|---|
| 1 | | Aristides Pereira (1923–2011) | 8 July 1975 | 22 March 1991 | 15 years, 257 days | PAIGC (until 1981) | 1975 | |
| 1 | | Aristides Pereira (1923–2011) | 8 July 1975 | 22 March 1991 | 15 years, 257 days | PAICV (from 1981) | 1981 | |
| 1 | | Aristides Pereira (1923–2011) | 8 July 1975 | 22 March 1991 | 15 years, 257 days | PAICV (from 1981) | 1986 | |
| 2 | | António Mascarenhas Monteiro (1944–2016) | 22 March 1991 | 22 March 2001 | 10 years | MpD | 1991 | |
| 2 | | António Mascarenhas Monteiro (1944–2016) | 22 March 1991 | 22 March 2001 | 10 years | MpD | 1996 | |
| 3 | | Pedro Pires (born 1934) | 22 March 2001 | 9 September 2011 | 10 years, 171 days | PAICV | 2001 | |
| 3 | | Pedro Pires (born 1934) | 22 March 2001 | 9 September 2011 | 10 years, 171 days | PAICV | 2006 | |
| 4 | | Jorge Carlos Fonseca (born 1950) | 9 September 2011 | 9 November 2021 | 10 years, 61 days | MpD | 2011 | |
| 4 | | Jorge Carlos Fonseca (born 1950) | 9 September 2011 | 9 November 2021 | 10 years, 61 days | MpD | 2016 | |
| 5 | | José Maria Neves (born 1960) | 9 November 2021 | Incumbent | 4 years, 357 days | PAICV | 2021 | |
| — | | Janira Hopffer Almada (born 1978); Acting President | 15 September 2026 | Incumbent | 47 days | PAICV | — | |

== Latest election ==
| Candidate | Party | Votes | % |
|---|---|---|---|
| José Maria Neves | African Party for the Independence of Cape Verde | 95,803 | 51.73 |
| Carlos Veiga | Movement for Democracy | 78,474 | 42.37 |
| Casimiro de Pina | Independent | 3,343 | 1.81 |
| Fernando Rocha Delgado | Independent | 2,516 | 1.36 |
| Helio Sanches | Independent | 2,119 | 1.14 |
| Gilson Alves | Independent | 1,558 | 0.84 |
| Joaquim Monteiro | Independent | 1,378 | 0.74 |
| Total | | 185,191 | 100.00 |
| Valid votes | | 185,191 | 96.90 |
| Invalid/blank votes | | 5,928 | 3.10 |
| Total votes | | 191,119 | 100.00 |
| Registered voters/turnout | | 398,865 | 47.92 |
Source: CNE

== See also ==
- Politics of Cape Verde
- List of prime ministers of Cape Verde
- List of colonial governors of Cape Verde
