= José Maria Neves Cabinet =

- Cabinet of Cape Verde
- Date formed: 22 September 2014
- Date dissolved: 22 April 2016

People and organisations
- Head of state: José Maria Neves
- Head of government: Prime Minister
- Deputy head of government: President
- No. of ministers: 40
- Total no. of members: 72
- Opposition party: Movement for Democracy (MpD)
- Opposition leader: Ulisses Correia e Silva

History
- Predecessor: 5th José Maria Neves Cabinet
- Successor: Ulisses Correia e Silva Cabinet

The 6th José Maria Neves government lasted from 22 September 2014 to 22 April 2016.

== Composition ==
Party key	Movement for Democracy
Party key	African Party for the Independence of Cape Verde
Party key	Democratic and Independent Cape Verdean Union

Cabinet of Cape Verde:22 September 2014–22 June 2016
Portrait	Portfolio	Incumbent
	Prime Minister of Cape Verde	José Maria Neves
	Vice Prime Minister; Minister of Health	Cristina Fontes Lima
	Minister of Finance and Plan	Cristina Monteiro Duarte
	Minister of National Defence and Parliamentary Affairs	Rui Semedo
	Minister of Foreign Affairs	Jorge Tolentino
	Minister of the Presidency of the Council of Ministers and Secretary General of the Social Communications	Démis Lobo Almeida
	Minister of Internal Affairs	Marisa do Nascimento Morais
	Minister of Justice	José Lopes Correia
	Minister of Infrastructures and Maritime Economy	Sara Duarte Lopes
	Minister of the Environment, Housing and Town and Country Planning	Emanuel Garcia da Veiga
	Minister of Youth	Janira Hopffer Almada
	Minister of Toruism, Investments and Business Development	Leonesa Fortes
	Minister of Education and Sport	Fernanda de Brito Marques
	Minister of Rural Development	Eva Verona Teixeira Ortet
	Minister of Higher Education, Science and Innovation	António Leão de Aguiar Correia e Silva
	Minister of the Communities	Fernanda Tavara Fernandes
	Minister of Culture	Mário Lúcio Sousa
	Secretary of State of Foreign Affairs	Maria Jesus Mascarenhas
	Secretary of State for Public Administration	Romeu Fonseca Modesto
	Secretary of State for Finances	Esana Carvalho
Ex officio member
	President of the National Assembly	Basílio Ramos
