= 2026 Cape Verdean parliamentary election =

- 17 May 2026

All 72 seats in the National Assembly 37 seats needed for a majority
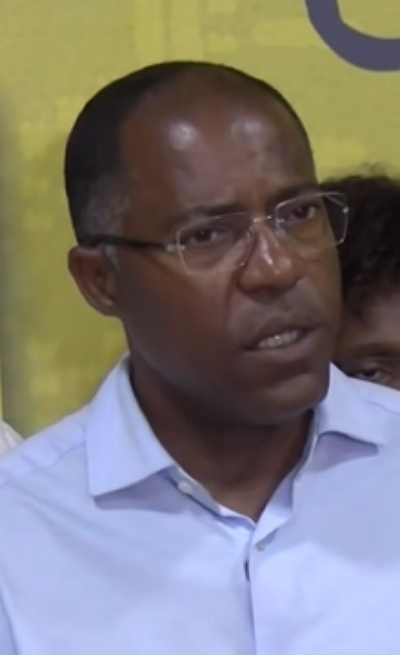

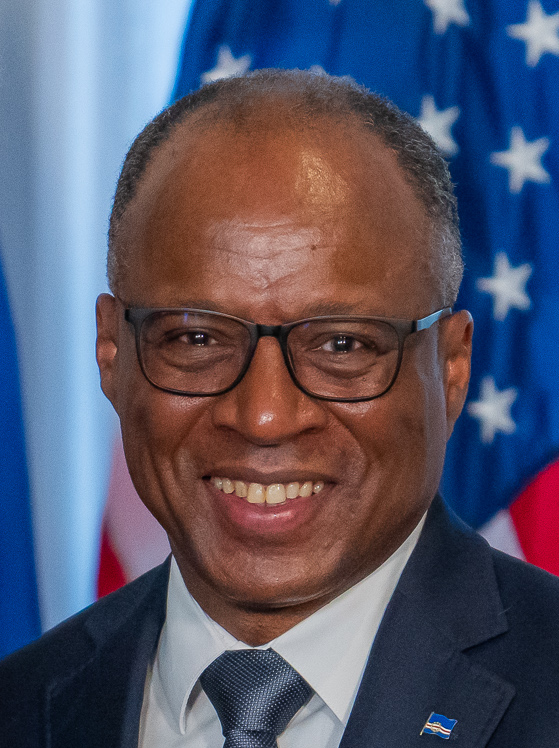

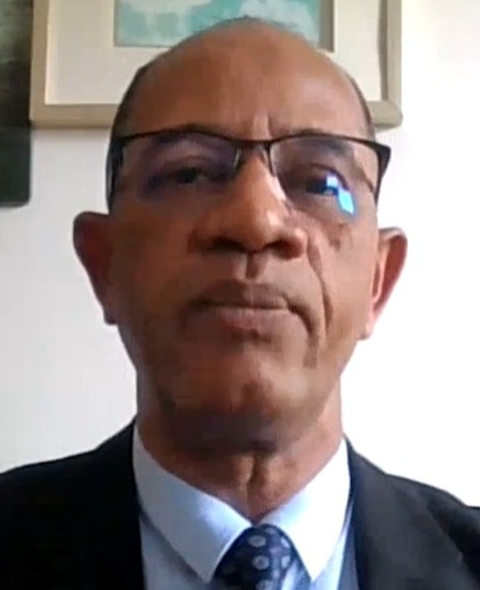
	First party	Second party	Third party
Leader	Francisco Carvalho	Ulisses Correia e Silva	João Santos Luís
Party	PAICV	MpD	UCID
Last election	30 seats	38 seats	4 seats
Seats won	37	33	2
Seat change	▲7	▼5	▼2
Popular vote	90,660	84,458	9,812
Percentage	48.04%	44.75%	5.20%
- Results by constituency
Prime Minister before election
Ulisses Correia e Silva
MpD
Elected Prime Minister
Francisco Carvalho
PAICV

Parliamentary elections were held in Cape Verde on 17 May 2026 to elect all 72 members of the National Assembly. The African Party for the Independence of Cape Verde (PAICV) won a majority of seats, unseating the Movement for Democracy (MpD). PAICV leader Francisco Carvalho was named prime minister–designate of Cape Verde.

== Background ==
The previous legislative elections of April 2021 — held during the COVID-19 pandemic — resulted in a majority for the Movement for Democracy (MpD), led by then-Prime Minister Ulisses Correia e Silva. Despite a decline in its percentage of the vote, the MpD managed to retain an absolute majority of seats, while the African Party for the Independence of Cape Verde (PAICV) led by Janira Hopffer Almada gained one seat after a marginal decrease in votes, and the Democratic and Independent Cape Verdean Union (UCID) benefited from a small increase in votes and took one more seat.

Held six months later, the October presidential election was won in the first round by José Maria Neves, former prime minister (2001–2016) from the PAICV. With over 51% of the vote, he defeated MpD candidate Carlos Veiga, who was also a former head of government. This victory established a power-sharing arrangement with Correia e Silva, also from the MpD.

In December 2024, the local elections saw the PAICV win 14 municipalities—including the capital, Praia. This was the first time the party had come out on top in municipal elections since those of February 2000. Despite the MpD's defeat, its national leadership announced on 12 January 2025 that it would renew its support for Correia e Silva for a new term in the 2026 legislative elections. On 25 May of the same year, the mayor of Praia, Francisco Carvalho, was elected as president of the PAICV. He was then considered to be the party's candidate for prime minister in 2026.

On 19 January 2026, President Neves announced legislative elections for 17 May following consultations with the various political parties; the presidential decree convening the election was published on 9 February. The 2026 presidential election is scheduled for 15 November for the first round, with a potential second round on 29 November, that is, six months after the legislative elections.

== Electoral system ==
The 72 members of the National Assembly are elected from 13 multi-member constituencies ranging in size from 2 to 19 seats, with 3 of the 13 multi-member constituencies are for diaspora voters in Africa, the Americas and Europe, Asia & Australia. The elections are held using closed list proportional representation, with seats allocated using the d'Hondt method.

== Parties ==
The MpD, PAICV, the UCID, the People Work and Solidarity (PTS), and the People's Party all contested the election.

Parliamentary parties		Ideology	Leader	Results in 2021
Movement for Democracy; Movimento para Democracia	MpD	Center to center-right – Liberalism, social liberalism, Christian democracy	Ulisses Correia e Silva (Prime Minister)	50.02% of the vote, 40 members of parliament
African Party for the Independence of Cape Verde; Partido Africano da Independência de Cabo Verde	PAICV	Left-wing – Social democracy, democratic socialism, left-wing nationalism	Francisco Carvalho	39.55% of the vote, 30 members of parliament
Democratic and Independent Cape Verdean Union; União caboverdiana independente e democrática	UCID	Centre-right – Conservatism, Christian democracy	João Santos Luís	9.01% of the vote, 4 members of parliament

== Campaign ==
The central issues of the campaign were the cost of living, poverty, and youth unemployment. The election was set against a rise in populism and polarisation as well as declining trust in democracy. Of the five parties running, only the MpD and PAICV were considered able to win a majority in the parliament. The incumbent MpD, who had been in power for 10 years at the time of the election, campaigned on a promise of stability. They defended their record in office and presented themselves as able to defend Cape Verdean democracy. The opposition PAICV campaigned for change and accused the MpD of not fulfilling promises for young people. The leader of the PAICV also stated his openness to reviewing the Constitution of Cape Verde and strengthening the justice system.

Two debates were held before the election: one on 28 April and one on 8 May. In the 28 April debate the leaders of all political parties standing in the election were invited, but the PAICV and PTS did not participate. At the time, the leader of the PAICV Francisco Carvalho was travelling around the country campaigning. A second debate was held on 8 May in which all five party leaders participated. The debate lasted for three hours and was hosted by the public radio station RTC. The debate was conducted in Cape Verdean Creole.

== Conduct ==
In April 2026, as the start of the official electoral campaign approached, the PAICV denounced repeated violations of the electoral code by the government of Ulisses Correia e Silva, which it accused of using state resources for partisan purposes, while the National Elections Commission (CNE) was criticised for its inaction in the face of these complaints. The government denounced the PAICV's complaints, stating that it was raised "with the aim of influencing the political game". On the other hand, the MpD also denounced Francisco Carvalho's decision not to resign as mayor of Praia but only to step aside by appointing a temporary replacement, as the electoral law prohibits the mayor and municipal councillors from standing in the constituency where they work. The MpD saw this manoeuvre as a "way to get around the law".

== Results ==
Provisional results indicated that the PAICV was guaranteed to win at least 33 seats and was on track to win an absolute majority of 37 seats. The MpD followed in second with 30 seats called so far, while the UCID secured third place with two seats. The abstention rate was 53.3%, revealing that more than half of Cape Verdeans did not vote in the election. While the PTS did not secure any parliamentary seats, votes for the PTS doubled from the previous election. The People's Party also did not secure any parliamentary seats, coming in fifth place in the popular vote.

Party	Votes	%	Seats	+/–
African Party for the Independence of Cape Verde	90,660	48.04	37	+7
Movement for Democracy	84,458	44.75	33	−5
Democratic and Independent Cape Verdean Union	9,812	5.20	2	−2
People Work and Solidarity	3,268	1.73	0	0
People's Party	529	0.28	0	0
Total	188,727	100.00	72	0
Valid votes	188,727	97.62		
Invalid votes	1,893	0.98		
Blank votes	2,709	1.40		
Total votes	193,329	100.00		
Registered voters/turnout	416,096	46.46		
Source: CNE

== List of elected MPs ==
Name	Party	Constituency
Abraão Aníbal Fernandes Barbosa Vicente	MpD	Santiago Sul
Adelaide Lopes de Brito	PAICV	Maio
Adélsia de Jesus Mendes Almeida	PAICV	Santiago Sul
Adilson da Graça Jesus	PAICV	São Vicente
Alberto Pereira Rodrigues	PAICV	America
Ana Paula Dias Santos Silves Ferreira	PAICV	Sal
Ana Paula Elias Curado da Moeda	PAICV	Santiago Sul
Angelino Gomes Coelho	MpD	Santiago Norte
Anilda Ineida Monteiro Tavares	MpD	Santiago Norte
Austelino Tavares Correia	MpD	Santiago Norte
Bertalino Borges Moreira	PAICV	Santiago Sul
Carla Santos de Carvalho	PAICV	Santiago Norte
Carla Solange Fortes Lima dos Santos	PAICV	Santiago Sul
Carlos Alberto dos Santos Tavares	PAICV	Santiago Sul
Carlos Andrade Monteiro	PAICV	Sal
Carlos Jorge Duarte Santos	MpD	Sal
Carlos Manuel do Canto Sena Monteiro	MpD	Santiago Sul
Carlos Tavares Rodrigues	PAICV	Santiago Norte
Celso Hermínio Soares Ribeiro	MpD	Santiago Norte
Clóvis Isildo da Lomba Barbosa da Silva	PAICV	Brava
Damião da Cruz Gomes Medina	MpD	Santo Antão
Dircilena Ludovina Évora Almeida Évora	MpD	Sal
Edson Liver Mendes Gomes	MpD	Santiago Norte
Elisângela Fernandes Semedo	PAICV	Santiago Norte
Emanuel Alberto Duarte Barbosa	MpD	Europa and Rest of the World
Emelena Freitas Alfama	PAICV	Santiago Sul
Eneida Isabel Brito Gomes da Graça Morais	MpD	São Nicolau
Eveline Nair Monteiro Ramos	PAICV	Santiago Norte
Fernando Elísio Leboucher Freire de Andrade	MpD	Santiago Sul
Fernando Jorge Neves da Graça	MpD	Maio
Filipe Alves Gomes dos Santos	MpD	Fogo
Francisco Avelino Vieira de Carvalho	PAICV	Santiago Sul
Francisco Correia Pereira	PAICV	Europe and Rest of the World
Francisco Natalino Fortes Dias Sanches	MpD	Santiago Norte
Giséle Fernande Antoinette Joséphine Lopes	PAICV	Africa
Glenda Cristina Fernandes Teixeira	MpD	São Vicente
Irene Nadir Fortes Ferreira Bento	MpD	São Vicente
Isa Filomena Pereira Soares da Costa	MpD	Santiago Sul
Ivone Delgado Cardoso	MpD	Brava
Janine Tatiana Santos Lélis	MpD	Santiago Sul
Janira Isabel Fonseca Hopffer Almada	PAICV	Santiago Sul
Joana Gomes Rosa Amado	MpD	Santiago Sul
João António Furtado Brito	PAICV	Santiago Norte
João do Carmo Brito Soares	PAICV	São Vicente
João Santos Luís	UCID	São Vicente
Joice Helena Spencer Pimenta Lima	PAICV	São Vicente
Jorge Pedro Maurício dos Santos	MpD	Santo Antão
José Manuel da Luz da Cruz Monteiro	PAICV	Santo Antão
José Ulisses de Pina Correia e Silva	MpD	Santiago Sul
Lídia Cristina da Cruz Brito Lima de Melo	MpD	São Vicente
Lúcia de Jesus Alves Garcia	PAICV	Santiago Norte
Lúcia Maria Mendes Gonçalves dos Passos	MpD	Santiago Sul
Luís António Nunes de Pina	PAICV	Fogo
Luís Carlos dos Santos Silva	MpD	Santiago Sul
Luís Joaquim Gonçalves Pires	PAICV	Fogo
Magui Arlene Ramos Almeida	PAICV	São Nicolau
Manuel Graciano Moreno Rocha	PAICV	Santiago Norte
Manuel Lopes de Brito	PAICV	Santiago Sul
Manuela Barbosa Lopes	PAICV	Fogo
Marcos Andrade Mendes	MpD	Boa Vista
Maria Alves Gomes	PAICV	America
Marízia Rosângela Brito Lima Oliveira	PAICV	Boa Vista
Orlando Pereira Dias	MpD	Africa
Paulo Augusto Rocha	MpD	São Vicente
Rosa Lopes Rocha	PAICV	Santo Antão
Sandra Elisa da Silva Galina Rodrigues	MpD	Santo Antão
Vander Paulo Silva Gomes	MpD	São Vicente
Vanuza Francisca Correia Teixeira Barbosa	MpD	Fogo
Vladmir Antero Delgado Silves Ferreira	PAICV	Santiago Sul
Wanderleya Soares Nascimento	PAICV	Santo Antão
Zilda Helena Pinheiro Pires de Oliveira	UCID	São Vicente

== Aftermath ==
PAICV candidate Magui Almeida celebrated the party winning the island of São Nicolau for the first time in its history, while UCID candidate Elton Sequeira conceded the party's defeat and also acknowledged how the UCID was building strength on the island. UCID leader João Santos Luís said that he was disappointed that the party lost half of its parliamentary representation, blaming the lower turnout for the loss. On Sal, MpD candidate Carlos Santos remarked that the party continued to lead on the island, while UCID candidate Aldirley Gomes and PAICV candidate Carlos Monteiro stated their concerns about the low turnout and alleged vote buying during the campaign. People's Party leader Amândio Vicente similarly denounced vote buying and the two-party system, stating that smaller parties still had lack of representation in the National Assembly. PTS leader Jónica Brito acknowledged the doubling of votes for the PTS and the low turnout, stating that Cape Verdeans were not satisfied with the two-party system of MpD and PAICV.

PAICV leader Francisco Carvalho declared that Cape Verdeans voted for a change of management and perspective for the future of the country, while also accusing the MpD of alleged vote buying over the campaign. PAICV deputy leader Janira Hopffer Almada added that the victory for PAICV represented Cape Verdeans choosing a platform of inclusion and shared prosperity. Carvalho also announced plans for growth and a "New Cape Verde" as well as emphasising the role of all the islands of the country in governance as opposed to simply ruling from Praia.

MpD coordinator Rui Figueiredo Soares expressed surprise at the results of the election, stating that the party was counting on retaining the absolute majority in the National Assembly. As a result of the MpD's loss, prime minister Ulisses Correia e Silva conceded to PAICV and announced his resignation from the party leadership, while also stating that the MpD will assume opposition.
