= List of ambassadors of Cape Verde to the United States =

Coordinates: 38.924957°N 77.067811°W

Ambassador of Cape Verde to United States
- Incumbent; Carlos Wahnon Veiga since November 14, 2016
- Inaugural holder: Raúl Querido Várela
- Formation: July 19, 1976

The Cape Verdean ambassador in Washington, D. C. is the official representative of the Government in Praia to the Government of the United States.

== List of representatives ==
Diplomatic agrément	Diplomatic accreditation	Ambassador	Observations	List of prime ministers of Cape Verde	List of presidents of the United States	Term end
July 5, 1975			Cape Verde attains independence from Portugal	Pedro Pires	Gerald Ford	
July 5, 1975			The Government of Pedro Pires recognized the government of Gerald Ford.	Pedro Pires	Gerald Ford	
July 2, 1976	July 19, 1976	Raúl Querido Várela	nascido 29 Dez 1925, Santa Catarina, Santiago, Cape Verde - Antepassados e parentes de Jorge, de Garda e de seus	Pedro Pires	Gerald Ford	
June 9, 1978		Viriato de Barros	Chargé d'affaires	Pedro Pires	Jimmy Carter	
July 24, 1980	August 22, 1980	Jose Luis Fernandes Lopes		Pedro Pires	Jimmy Carter	
August 8, 1991	September 5, 1991	Carlos Alberto Santos Silva		Carlos Veiga	George H. W. Bush	
February 8, 1995	March 20, 1995	Corentino Virgilio Santos		Carlos Veiga	Bill Clinton	
October 19, 1998	October 27, 1998	Amilcar Spencer Lopes		Carlos Veiga	Bill Clinton	
October 18, 2001	November 8, 2001	José Brito		José Maria Neves	George W. Bush	
August 16, 2007	September 18, 2007	Fátima Veiga		José Maria Neves	George W. Bush	
June 11, 2014	July 14, 2014	José Luís Fialho Rocha		José Maria Neves	Barack Obama	
November 14, 2016		Carlos Wahnon Veiga		Ulisses Correia e Silva	Donald Trump	
2020		José Luís Livramento				

- Cape Verde–United States relations
