= Piaget =

Piaget (French pronunciation: [pjaʒɛ]) may refer to:

== People with the surname ==
- Édouard Piaget (1817–1910), Swiss entomologist
- Jean Piaget (1896–1980), Swiss developmental psychologist
- Paul Piaget (disambiguation), several people
- Solange Piaget Knowles (born 1986), American recording artist, actress, model and DJ

== Other uses ==
- Piaget's theory of cognitive development, a theory about the nature and development of human intelligence
- Piaget SA, a Swiss watchmaker and jeweler
- Piaget Building, a building in New York City, US
- Jean Piaget University of Angola, a university in based in Luanda, Angola
- Jean Piaget University of Cape Verde, a university in Praia, Cape Verde, with a smaller second location in Mindelo, Cape Verde
- Instituto Piaget, a Portuguese private institution of higher education
- Piaget Belgian Open, a former men's golf tournament in Belgium

== See also ==
- Paget (disambiguation)
