= Jean Piaget University =

Jean Piaget University may refer to:

- Jean Piaget University of Angola
- Jean Piaget University of Cape Verde
