= Livramento =

Livramento may refer to:

== Places ==
=== Brazil ===
- Livramento, Paraíba
- Livramento de Nossa Senhora, Bahia
- Nossa Senhora do Livramento, Mato Grosso, Brazil
- Nossa Senhora do Livramento, Cape Verde
- Santana do Livramento, Rio Grande do Sul

=== Portugal ===
- Livramento (Ponta Delgada), Azores

== People ==
=== Politics ===
- José Luís Livramento, Cape Verde politician

=== Sports ===
- Dailon Livramento (born 2001), Cape Verde football player
- Tino Livramento (born 2002), English football player
