= Eliza Clívia =

Brazilian singer (1979–2017)

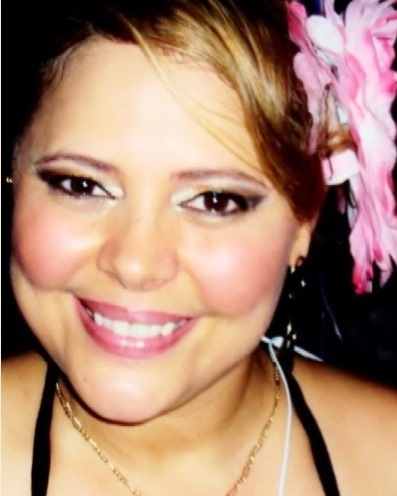
- Eliza Clívia in 2012
- Born: Eliza Clívia Angelino Maranhão; November 14, 1979; Livramento, Paraíba, Brazil
- Died: June 16, 2017 (aged 37); Aracaju, Sergipe, Brazil
- Occupation: Singer
- Years active: 1997–2017
- Spouse: Jaílson Santos (2006–2016)
- Partner: Sérgio Ramos (2017) (her death)

Eliza Clívia (November 14, 1979 – June 16, 2017) was a Brazilian singer of electronic forró.

== Biography ==
Influenced by her accordionist father, Eliza began her singing career in the city of Monteiro (PB) where she joined the Big Banda group, which later changed the name to Laços de Amor. In 2003, she joined Cavaleiros do Forró, where she remained for 10 years, during which time she participated in the recording of nine CDs and six DVDs. In 2013 it was announced that she would leave the band together with Jaílson Santos (she was married to him until 2016).

In 2013, Eliza and Jaílson announced their return to the stages in the Forró Cavalo de Aço, where it remained during five years, next to Marcelo Jubão and Neto Araújo. In 2017 she started her solo career.

== Death ==
Eliza died in the afternoon of June 16, 2017, at the age of 37, after an automobile accident at the intersection of Maruim and Arauá streets, Aracaju Center, Sergipe. Her car hit an urban transport bus. Besides Eliza and the driver, her boyfriend Sergio Ramos da Silva, also died in the accident. He was a musician and the manager of the singer.

She is buried in Cemitério da Saudade in Livramento, Paraíba.

== Discography ==
=== Cavaleiros do Forró ===
CDs

- 2003 : 4 Estilos – Vol. 3
- 2004 : Nossa História, Nosso Acústico
- 2005 : Meio a Meio – Vol. 4
- 2006 : No Reino dos Cavaleiros – Vol. 5
- 2007 : Forrozada – Volume 6
- 2008 : Beber e Amar – Vol. 7
- 2010 : Cavaleiros do Forró – Volume 8
- 2011 : Ao Vivo em Aracaju
- 2012 : Cavaleiros Universitário

DVDs

- 2005 : O Filme ao vivo em Natal
- 2006 : O Filme 2 – No Reino dos Cavaleiros
- 2007 : Cavaleiros Elétrico – Ao Vivo em Feira de Santana
- 2007 : Ao Vivo em Caruaru
- 2008 : Volume 4: Beber e Amar – Ao Vivo em Maceió
- 2009 : Cavaleiros do Forró — 8 Anos
- 2011 : Volume 5 – Ao Vivo em Aracaju
- 2011 : Cavaleiros do Forró — 10 Anos

=== Forró Cavalo de Aço ===
CDs

- 2013 : Cavalo de Aço: A História Continua
- 2014 : Cavalo de Aço: Promocional 2014
- 2015 : Cavalo de Aço: Promocional 2015

DVDs

- 2013 : Cavalo de Aço: Ao Vivo em Lagoa de Pedras
- 2014 : Cavalo de Aço: Ao Vivo em Campo Redondo
- 2014 : Cavalo de Aço: Ao Vivo no Forró Caju 2014
- 2015 : Cavalo de Aço: Ao Vivo em Lagoa de Pedras

== See also ==
- Cavaleiros do Forró
