= Manuel Inocêncio Sousa =

Cape Verdean politician

Minister of Foreign Affairs
- In office 2001–2002
- President: Pedro Pires
- Preceded by: Rui Alberto de Figueiredo Soares
- Succeeded by: Fátima Veiga

Personal details
- Born: 22 June 1951 (age 74) Mindelo, São Vicente, Portuguese Cape Verde
- Party: PAICV
- Occupation: Politician

Manuel Inocêncio Sousa (born 22 June 1951) is a Cape Verdean politician. Sousa was Minister of Foreign Affairs of Cape Verde from 2001 to 2002 and subsequently Minister of Infrastructure, Transports and Sea.

== Biography ==
Manuel Inocêncio Sousa was born in Mindelo on the island of São Vicente on 22 June 1951. He obtained a degree in civil engineering and also has a master's degree in sanitary engineering.

He became a member of PAICV in 1988 in the government of the African Party for the Independence of Cape Verde (PAICV). In 1988 he became a member of the National Directorate, the Political Commission, and the Permanent Commission within PAICV. From 1991 to 2001, he was deputy of the National Assembly. Afterwards he was Foreign Minister of Cape Verde from 2001 to 2002 he succeeded Rui Alberto de Figueiredo Soares and was succeeded by Fátima Veiga. In 2010 he became one of three vice-presidents of PAICV after José Maria Neves's support of him. He became known for attempting to confront the conservative wing of the party led by Pedro Pires in order for him to fall in line with support, after he supported the candidacy of Aristides Lima. He stood unsuccessfully as the PAICV's candidate in the 2011 presidential election on 12 March, He was considered a favorite of the party leader Neves. In the first round on 7 August, he was second with 32.47% behind Fonseca with 37.76% and ahead of Lima by 27.8%, in the second round, he lost to Fonseca with 45.84% of the vote.

He is also the president of CV Telecom since 2012 after running for president.

Political offices
Preceded by Rui Alberto de Figueiredo Soares	Foreign Minister of Cape Verde; 2001–2002	Succeeded by Fátima Veiga
