= Jorge Borges (politician) =

Cape Verdean politician

Foreign Minister of Cape Verde
- In office 2011–2014
- President: Jorge Carlos Fonseca
- Preceded by: José Brito
- Succeeded by: Jorge Tolentino

Personal details
- Born: 17 April 1952 (age 74) São Vicente, Cape Verde
- Occupation: Politician

Jorge Borges (born 17 April 1952 in São Vicente, Cape Verde) is a Cape Verdean politician. He served as the minister of foreign affairs and communities and minister of defence from 2011 to 2014. He succeeded José Brito and was succeeded by Jorge Tolentino.

== See also ==
- Foreign relations of Cape Verde

Preceded by José Brito	Foreign Minister of Cape Verde; 2011–2014	Succeeded by Jorge Tolentino
