= José Filomeno Monteiro =

Cape Verde politician (1955–2025)

Minister of Foreign Affairs
- In office 9 October 2024 – 29 October 2025
- Preceded by: Rui Alberto de Figueiredo Soares
- Succeeded by: José Luís Livramento

Personal details
- Born: José Filomeno de Carvalho Dias Monteiro; 1 September 1955
- Died: 8 December 2025 (aged 70) Praia, Cape Verde
- Party: Movement for Democracy

José Filomeno de Carvalho Dias Monteiro (1 September 1955 – 8 December 2025) was a Cape Verde politician who was Minister of Foreign Affairs from 2024 to 2025. He was previously ambassador to Belgium, the Netherlands, Hungary and the European Union. He was a Member of Parliament for the Movement for Democracy (MPD) from 2001 to 2006 and later from 2011 to 2016.

On 9 December 2025, it was announced that Monteiro had died at the age of 70 at the Agostinho Neto Hospital in Praia following a long illness.
