= Janira Hopffer Almada =

Cape Verdean politician

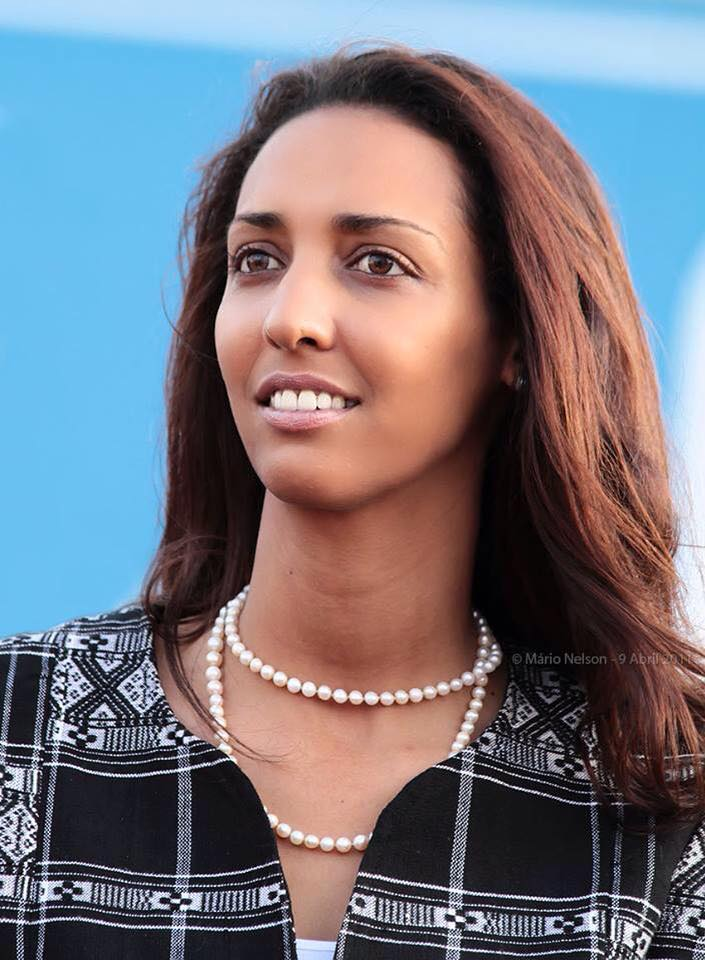

Acting President of Cape Verde
- In office 15 September 2026 – 15 November 2026
- Prime Minister: Francisco Carvalho
- Preceded by: José Maria Neves
- Succeeded by: José María Neves

8th President of the National Assembly
- Incumbent
- Assumed office 18 June 2026
- President: José Maria Neves
- Prime Minister: Francisco Carvalho
- Preceded by: Austelino Correia

President of the African Party for the Independence of Cape Verde
- In office 14 December 2014 – 18 April 2021
- Preceded by: José Maria Neves
- Succeeded by: Rui Semedo

Personal details
- Born: Janira Isabel Fonseca Hopffer Almada; 27 September 1978 (age 48) Praia, Cape Verde
- Party: African Party for the Independence of Cape Verde
- Education: University of Coimbra

Janira Isabel Fonseca Hopffer Almada (born 27 September 1978) is a lawyer and politician from Cape Verde who served as the president of the African Party for the Independence of Cape Verde (PAICV) from 2014 to 2021. She is the current President of the National Assembly, the first woman to hold that position.

== Early life and education ==
Almada was born on 27 September 1978 in Praia, Santiago Island. Her father is a lawyer and PAICV Minister of Justice David Hopffer Almada. She has a degree in law and a graduate degree in business law from the University of Coimbra in Portugal.

== Career ==
Almada is a lawyer and worked as an associate at her father's firm, D. Hopffer Almada and Associates. She is a member of the Cape Verde Bar Association and was a teacher at the Jean Piaget University of Cape Verde from 2003 to 2006.

Almada was Municipal Representative in the 2008 municipal elections and was elected to parliament in 2011. She became Minister of Youth, Employment, and Human Resources Development.

Almada was elected leader of the PAICV on 14 December 2014 with 51.24% of the votes, succeeding José Maria Neves, becoming the party's youngest, as well as first female, president. She led the party to the 2016 elections; after the MpD party won a landslide victory, she announced her resignation. However, she decided to run again at the next party convention, and won reelection as the party president.

In August 2016, Almada was invited to a congress held by the Popular Movement for the Liberation of Angola (MPLA) in Angola as a delegate, both parties linked to the struggle against colonialism and for independence. Meetings were held between the participants of PAICV, MPLA and the Portuguese Socialist Party (PS) whose president is Carlos César and some others.

Almada resigned from the PAICV's leadership following another loss for her party during the 2021 elections. The PAICV regained power in the 2026 elections, and she was appointed President of the National Assembly on 18 June 2026. From 15 September 2026 to 15 November 2026, Almada served as Cape Verde’s acting president during the re-election campaign of president José Maria Neves.
