= Austelino Correia =

Cape Verdean politician

Austelino Correia MP
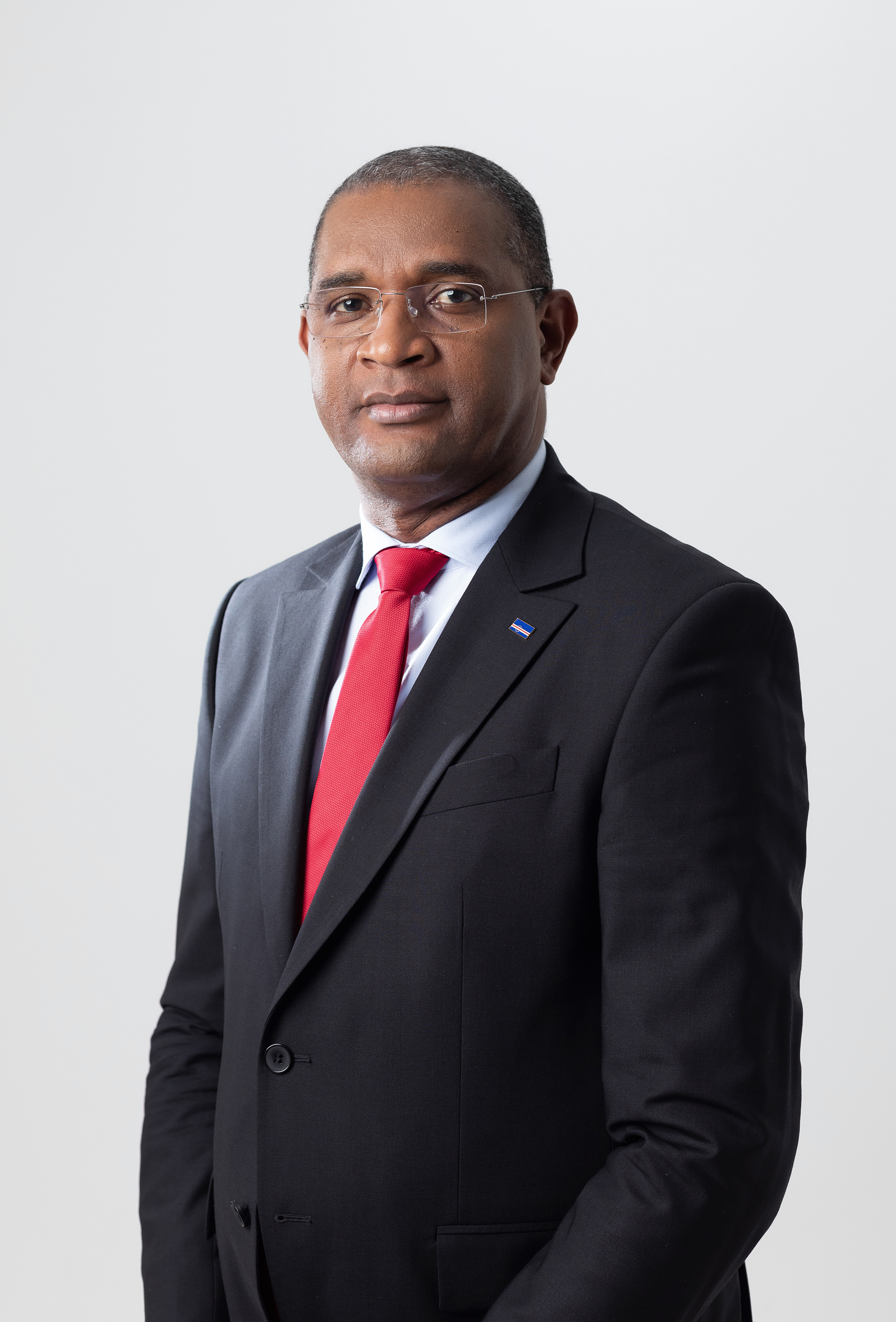
- Official portrait, 2024

7th President of the National Assembly
- In office 19 May 2021 – 18 June 2026
- President: Jorge Carlos Fonseca; José Maria Neves
- Prime Minister: Ulisses Correia e Silva
- Preceded by: Jorge Santos
- Succeeded by: Janira Hopffer Almada

Personal details
- Born: Austelino Tavares Correia; 8 August 1968 (age 57)
- Party: Movement for Democracy
- Education: Jean Piaget University of Cape Verde

Austelino Tavares Correia (born 8 August 1968) is a Cape Verdean politician who served as the 7th President of the National Assembly from 2021 to 2026. He is a member of the assembly representing Santiago North as a member of the Movement for Democracy. Prior to his presidency of the assembly he was vice president and acting president of Cape Verde for ten hours in 2016.

== Early life ==
Austelino Tavares Correia was born on 8 August 1968. He graduated from Jean Piaget University of Cape Verde after attending from 2003 to 2008.

== Career ==
Correia was elected to the National Assembly as a member of the Movement for Democracy representing Santiago North.

Correia was elected vice president of the assembly. On 21 November 2016, Correia was acting president of Cape Verde for ten hours as both President Jorge Carlos Fonseca and President of the National Assembly Jorge Santos were outside of the country. Correia was elected president of the assembly by a vote of 64 to 4 with no candidates in opposition to him on 19 May 2021.

Correia led Cape Verde's delegation to the Inter-Parliamentary Union in 2018. On 15 May 2024, Correia led a delegation, which included members of the cabinet and parliament, to Senegal. In 2025, he led a delegation to Luxembourg, one of Cape Verde's major international partners.

Janira Hopffer Almada was selected to replace Correia as president on 18 June 2026.

== Political positions ==
Correia recognises Western Sahara as a part of Morocco. In 2024, he praised that state of democracy among member states of the Community of Portuguese Language Countries as "quite acceptable" and called for less interference in Guinea-Bissau's internal affairs.

== Works cited ==
=== News ===
- "Austelino Correia chefia delegação nacional à assembleia-geral da União Inter-parlamentar". Expresso das Ilhas. 17 March 2018. Archived from the original on 1 July 2025.
- "Austelino Correia eleito presidente da Assembleia Nacional de Cabo Verde". Rádio e Televisão de Portugal. 19 May 2021. Archived from the original on 19 May 2021.
- "Cabo Verde com três presidentes da República e do Parlamento diferentes numa semana". Rádio e Televisão de Portugal. 25 November 2016. Archived from the original on 2 July 2025.
- "Le Pdt de l'Assemblée nationale du Cap-Vert réitére le soutien de son pays à l'intégrité territoriale du Maroc". SNRT. 14 June 2023. Archived from the original on 1 July 2025.
- "Presidente do parlamento de Cabo Verde pede menos ingerência nos assuntos de Bissau". Rádio e Televisão de Portugal. 24 July 2024. Archived from the original on 2 July 2025.
- De Burgo, Henry (25 March 2025). "Grão-Duque convidado para os 50 anos da independência de Cabo Verde". Contacto. Archived from the original on 1 July 2025.
- Santos, Odair (18 June 2026). "Janira Hopffer Almada eleita presidente do parlamento cabo-verdiano". Radio France Internationale. Archived from the original on 19 June 2026.
- Sene, Dieyna (14 May 2024). "Diplomatie: M. Austélino Tavares Correia, Le Président de l'Assemblée nationale du Cabo-Verde en visite officielle au Sénégal du 15 au 19 mai 2024". Lactuacho. Archived from the original on 1 July 2025.

=== Web ===
- "Cabo Verde". Inter-Parliamentary Union. Archived from the original on 1 July 2025.
- "Deputado Nacional". Movement for Democracy. Archived from the original on 2 July 2025.
- "Licenciado pela UniPiaget eleito novo presidente da Assembleia Nacional". Jean Piaget University of Cape Verde. Archived from the original on 1 July 2025.
