= Francisco Carvalho =

Prime Minister of Cape Verde since 2026

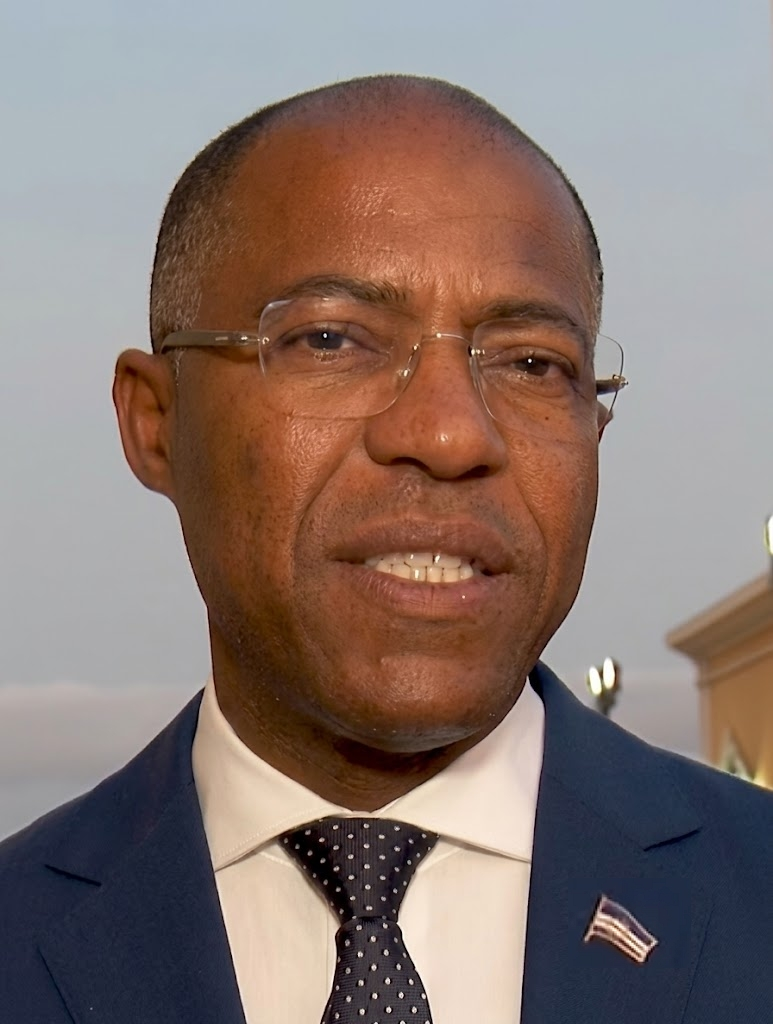
- Carvalho in 2026

Prime Minister of Cape Verde
- Incumbent
- Assumed office 19 June 2026
- President: José Maria Neves
- Preceded by: Ulisses Correia e Silva

President of the African Party for the Independence of Cape Verde
- Incumbent
- Assumed office 25 May 2025
- Preceded by: Rui Semedo

Mayor of Praia
- In office 20 November 2020 – 19 June 2026
- Preceded by: Óscar Santos
- Succeeded by: Bequeline Morais Silva

Personal details
- Born: Francisco Avelino Vieira de Carvalho; 4 December 1970 (age 55) Fogo, Portuguese Cape Verde
- Party: PAICV
- Education: NOVA University Lisbon

Francisco Avelino Vieira de Carvalho (Note: Portuguese pronunciation: [fɾɐ̃ˈsiʃku ɐvɨˈlinu ˈvjejɾɐ dɨ kɐɾˈvaʎu].) (born 4 December 1970) is a Cape Verdean politician and the current prime minister of Cape Verde since 2026. A member of the African Party for the Independence of Cape Verde, which he leads, he has also served as mayor of the municipality of Praia since 2020. In the 2026 parliamentary election, Carvalho's party secured a majority in the National Assembly.

== Early life ==
Carvalho was born on 4 December 1970, in Fogo, Cape Verde. He holds a bachelor's degree in sociology and a doctorate in Migration, Ethnic Minorities and Trans-nationalism, both from the NOVA University Lisbon. In 2002, Carvalho established the Association of Young Cape Verdean Researchers at university in Lisbon and became its first president. He had moved back to Cape Verde by 2008, when he led a research project on urban violence in the country's cities.

== Mayor of Praia ==
In October 2020, he was elected President of the City Council of the municipality of Praia, equivalent to mayor, representing the African Party for the Independence of Cape Verde, and he took office on 20 November. During Cape Verde's response to the COVID-19 pandemic, Carvalho was criticised by then-prime minister Ulisses Correia e Silva of non-cooperation with government vaccination programmes after he did not participate in a visit around the city with the Silva to promote vaccination. He hosted the 28th Festival de Gamboa in 2022, the first since before the COVID pandemic, and presented the awards there.

Carvalho was re-elected in 2024, with over 25,000 votes. Shortly after the election, he was pressured to resign by then-Minister of Culture Abraão Vicente, who was contesting the municipal election, to resign. In response, he asserted that he had been elected by the people of Praia and Vicente had only been appointed by the prime minister. In response to complaints about poor garbage collection in Praia in the summer of 2025, Carvalho promised to improve the sanitation system in the city. A scandal arose in December 2025 when police forcibly entered the Praia City Hall to seize documents and cordon off areas of the building. The national Attorney General's office had launched an investigation against Carvalho's administration and subsequently threatened suspension of the mayor. However, Carvalho avoided suspension and instead denounced the ruling MpD for an abuse of power.

Carvalho first announced his candidacy for president of the PAICV in January 2025. On 25 May 2025, he was elected president of the party, receiving 62% of the vote. He stated in April that he would not officially resign as mayor of Praia but would appoint a substitute while he is campaigning in the election. Following his election victory in 2026, Carvalho criticised Ulisses Correia e Silva's performance as mayor of Praia before him.

== Prime Minister ==
In the 2026 parliamentary election, Carvalho's party secured a majority in the National Assembly, positioning him as the prime minister–designate of Cape Verde. He was sworn in by President José Maria Neves on 19 June 2026.

== Political positions ==
Carvalho supports free public higher education and universal health care, among other humanitarian and safety net programs. During the 2026 election campaign, he put emphasis on improving inter-island transportation and the role of all the islands in the governance of the country.

== Notes ==
Political offices
Preceded by Ulisses Correia e Silva	Prime Minister of Cape Verde; 2026–	Succeeded by Incumbent
