= People Work and Solidarity =

People Work and Solidarity (PTS)
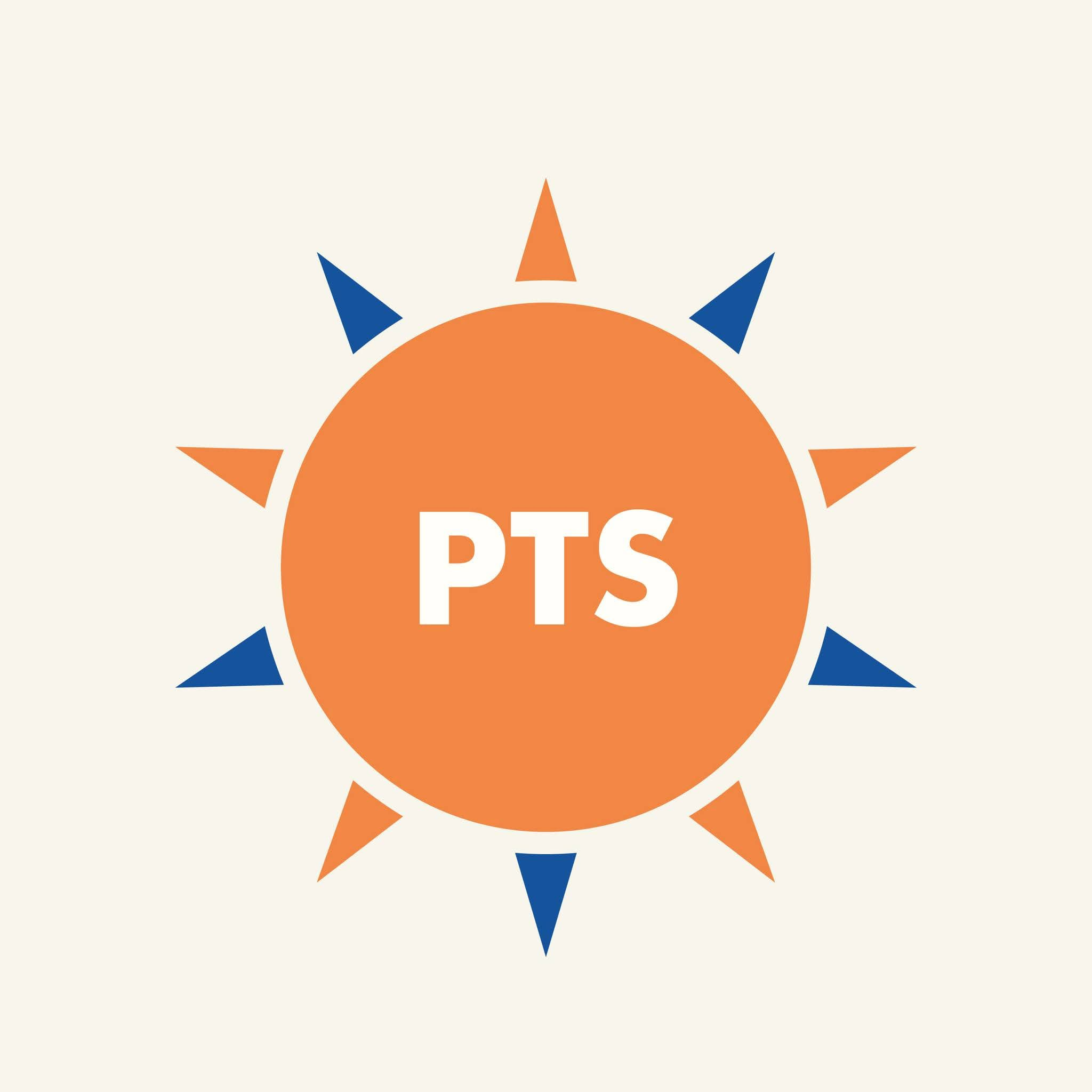
- Abbreviation: PTS
- President: Jónica Brito Tavares
- Secretary: Jailson Gonçalves da Silva
- Vice-president: Jailson de Aguiar
- Founder: Onésimo Silveira
- Founded: November 10, 2000; 25 years ago (registration)
- Headquarters: Praia
- Ideology: Social democracy
- Political position: Centre-left
- Colours: Orange, Blue and White
- Slogan: Cabo Verde na Korason
- National Assembly: 0 / 72

Website
- https://ptsoficial.cv/

People Work and Solidarity (Portuguese: Pessoas Trabalho e Solidariedade, PTS) is a political party in Cape Verde, originally registered as the Labour and Solidarity Party on 10 November 2000. The current name appears in the party statutes deposited with the Constitutional Court of Cape Verde, in the 2021 version, while maintaining the acronym PTS.

The party was founded by Onésimo Silveira, a former mayor of São Vicente, diplomat, writer and Cape Verdean political figure. Without parliamentary representation since its creation, PTS has participated in Cape Verdean legislative elections, presenting itself as an alternative to the political dominance of the Movement for Democracy (MpD) and the African Party for the Independence of Cape Verde (PAICV).

== History ==
=== Foundation and early years ===
PTS was registered with the Constitutional Court of Cape Verde on 10 November 2000, under the name Partido do Trabalho e da Solidariedade. In the same year, it joined the Democratic Alliance for Change (ADM), a coalition formed by the Independent and Democratic Cape Verdean Union (UCID), the Democratic Convergence Party (PCD) and PTS, registered on 26 November 2000.

The creation of the party was associated with Onésimo Silveira, one of the most relevant political figures from São Vicente in the period following Cape Verde's democratic opening. In addition to his party activity, Silveira was a writer, diplomat, former Cape Verdean ambassador to Portugal and the first elected mayor of São Vicente in the multiparty period.

=== Electoral participation ===
The party has participated in different legislative elections without obtaining representation in the National Assembly of Cape Verde. In 2016, it ran under the leadership of José Augusto Fernandes, presenting itself as a political force focused on defending the most disadvantaged social sectors.

In the 2011 legislative elections, PTS obtained 1,040 votes, without electing deputies to the National Assembly. In 2016, it ran only in the Santiago Sul constituency, obtaining 94 votes. In 2021, it expanded its electoral presence to six constituencies and obtained 2,088 votes, remaining without elected deputies.

=== Reorganisation of 2021 ===
The reorganisation of PTS in 2021 took place in a context of rapprochement between the party and figures from independent candidacies that had participated in the 2020 municipal elections. In Praia, the independent group Liderança União Trabalho e Amor (LUTA), led by Carlos Lopes, known as Romeu di Lurdes, obtained 866 votes, corresponding to 2.3%, finishing third in the municipality without electing municipal representatives. In Tarrafal of Santiago, Cláudio Sousa was a candidate for the municipal council for Movimento Independente Tarrafal (MIT), a citizens' group that obtained 1,157 votes in the 2020 municipal elections.

In the 2021 legislative elections, Cláudio Sousa assumed the interim leadership of PTS and was the party's lead candidate for the Santiago Norte constituency.

In August 2021, PTS held a national congress in the city of Praia to elect new bodies, revise its statutes and update the organisation's political identity. Carlos Lopes was elected party president, succeeding José Augusto Fernandes.

The reorganisation marked the change from the name Partido do Trabalho e da Solidariedade to Pessoas Trabalho e Solidariedade, while retaining the acronym PTS. The change sought to associate the party's identity with the centrality of people, work and solidarity, while preserving the historical continuity of the acronym. Carlos Lopes's leadership was recognised by outgoing president José Augusto Fernandes, who validated the legality of the national congress.

José Augusto Fernandes died in October 2021, and the party publicly expressed sorrow over the death of its former leader.

=== Reactivation in 2026 ===
After the death of Carlos Lopes, PTS entered a new process of internal reorganisation. In March 2026, the party leadership announced its political reactivation ahead of the legislative elections of 17 May that year.

The new leadership came to be headed by Jónica Brito Tavares, with Jailson de Aguiar as vice-president and Jailson Gonçalves da Silva as secretary-general.

== 2026 legislative election ==
In the 2026 legislative elections, PTS ran in six constituencies:

- Santiago Norte;
- Santiago Sul;
- São Vicente;
- Americas;
- Africa;
- Europe and the Rest of the World.

The candidacy brought together 67 candidates, with a notable presence of young people and women.

The 2026 campaign was marked by a critical stance toward Cape Verdean bipartisanship and by the presentation of the party as a political alternative to the country's two largest parties, PAICV and MpD. The electoral slogan used was “Cabo Verde no Coração”, associated with proposals on political renewal, domestic production, inclusion of the diaspora, inter-island transport, education, health, housing and social justice.

In São Vicente, the party presented Jailson D’Aguiar as lead candidate, defending greater political representation for the island in the National Assembly. The local candidacy invoked the continuity of the political values associated with Onésimo Silveira, the party's founder.

In the final results proclaimed by the National Electoral Commission, PTS obtained 3,268 votes, corresponding to 1.73% of valid votes, without electing deputies. The election was won by PAICV, followed by MpD and UCID, which retained parliamentary representation.

Although it did not win parliamentary seats, the party increased its vote compared with the 2021 legislative elections. Cape Verdean media highlighted the electoral rise of PTS and its assertion in urban constituencies, although the party remained without representation in the National Assembly.

== Political orientation ==
PTS has centred its political discourse on the value of people, work and solidarity, with emphasis on issues such as social justice, youth inclusion, housing, health, inter-island transport, domestic production and participation of the diaspora in national development.

During the 2026 legislative campaign, the party leadership presented the fight against bipartisanship as one of the central axes of its political intervention. PTS also defended the need to bring parliamentary representation closer to peripheral communities, young people and social groups with less access to political decision-making.

In June 2026, after the fire at Ponta Belém, in the city of Praia, the party defended holding a national debate on safety, protection of traders and conditions in markets and informal trading spaces in Cape Verde.

== Symbol and colours ==
The PTS symbol consists of a circle and two crossed stars forming ten points, using the colours orange, blue and white. The circular shape represents the sun, while the stars symbolise the presence of PTS among the Cape Verdean population and the sea that connects the islands.

== Electoral results ==
=== Legislative elections ===
Year	Pos.	Votes	%	+/-	Seats	+/-	Status
2011	4th	1,040	0.46	▲	0 / 72		No parliamentary representation
2016	6th	94	0.05	▼	0 / 72		No parliamentary representation
2021	4th	2,088	0.94	▲	0 / 72		No parliamentary representation
2026	4th	3,268	1.73	▲	0 / 72		No parliamentary representation

== See also ==
- Politics of Cape Verde
- National Assembly (Cape Verde)
- Onésimo Silveira
