= Cavaleiros do Forró - O Filme ao vivo em Natal =

O Filme ao vivo em Natal

Live album by Cavaleiros do Forró
- Released: 2005
- Recorded: November 28, 2004
- Genre: Forró
- Length: 87:18
- Label: Independent
- Producer: Alex Padang

Cavaleiros do Forró chronology
O Filme ao vivo em Natal	O Filme 2 - No Reino dos Cavaleiros

O Filme ao vivo em Natal is the first live album by the Brazilian band Cavaleiros do Forró, released in 2005. The album was recorded during a single concert performed on November 28, 2004, at Estádio Machadão in Natal, Rio Grande do Norte.

Cavaleiros do Forró was the first forró band to record a DVD in a football stadium.

== Track listing ==
1. Abertura
2. Alô
3. Se réi pra la
4. Vá dar trabalho a outro
5. O Esporte da Mulher (O Karatê)
6. Bebo, rico e brabo
7. Avise a ela
8. Mar de Doçura
9. A vontade que eu tenho
10. A música do dia
11. Pra sempre
12. Acústico:
13. Minha história
14. Os Outros
15. Você vai ver
16. Abertura II
17. Frete
18. Ciúme
19. Mulher eletricista
20. Doce desejo
21. Iô Iô
22. Penitência
23. Só você
24. Homenagem Vaqueiros:
25. Sonho de vaquejada
26. Com a corda toda

== Certifications ==
Region	Certification	Sales/shipments
Brazil - DVD	2× Platinum	250,000
