= José Luís Jesus =

Cape Verdean politician

Minister of Foreign Affairs
- In office 1998–1999
- President: António Mascarenhas Monteiro
- Preceded by: Amílcar Spencer Lopes
- Succeeded by: Rui Alberto de Figueiredo Soares

Personal details
- Born: September 20, 1950 (age 76) Ribeira Grande, Santo Antão, Cape Verde
- Education: University of Lisbon; St. John's University
- Occupation: Politician

José Luís Jesus (born September 20, 1950) is a former Cape Verdean politician. He was foreign minister of the country from 1998-1999.

== Biography ==
He was born in Ribeira Grande, in the north of Santo Antão, one of the northernmost Cape Verdean communities. In 1978, he headed abroad to the University of Lisbon in Portugal not long after independence of his nation. Later in 1985, he took courses in international law, political sciences and politics at St. John's University in New York City. From 1979 to 1982, he headed a delegation of his country at the third UN conference on maritime law. He also served as chairmen of the Group of African States at the United Nations in 1986. He became Foreign Minister from 1998 to 1999. He was later Cape Verdean ambassador to Israel, Portugal and Spain from 1994 to 1996.

Since October 1, 1999, he has been judge at the International Tribune in Hamburg. Later, he was president of the International Tribunal for the Law of the Sea (ITLOS) from 2008 to 2011. He succeeded the German jurist Rüdiger Wolfrum and was succeeded by the Japanese Shunji Yanai.

== Publications ==
- Intervention in the domestic affairs on humanitarian grounds and international law. In: Volkmar Götz (Hrsg.): Liber amicorum Günther Jaenicke - zum 85. Geburtstag. Springer, Berlin 1998, ISBN 3-540-65125-X, p. 149.
- Rocks, new-born islands, sea level rise and maritime space. In: Jochen Abr. Frowein (Hrsg.): Verhandeln für den Frieden - Negotiating for peace - Liber Amicorum Tono Eitel. Springer, Berlin 2003, ISBN 3-540-40073-7, p. 579.
- Protection of foreign ships against piracy and terrorism at sea. In: International journal of marine and coastal law. Vol. 18, 2003-3, ISSN 0927-3522, p. 363.

Political offices
Preceded by Amílcar Spencer Lopes	Foreign Minister of Cape Verde; 1998-1999	Succeeded by Rui Alberto de Figueiredo Soares

Preceded by Rüdiger Wolfrum	President of the International Tribunal for the Law of the Sea; 2008-2011	Succeeded by Shunji Yanai
