= António do Espírito Santo Fonseca =

Cape Verdean politician

President of the National Assembly of Cape Verde
- In office 30 January 1996 – 13 February 2001
- President: António Mascarenhas Monteiro
- Preceded by: Amilcar Spencer Lopes
- Succeeded by: Aristides Lima

Personal details
- Born: April 26, 1951 (age 75) Lombo Branco, Santo Antão, Cape Verde
- Occupation: Politician

António do Espírito Santo Fonseca (born April 26, 1951) is a former Cape Verdean politician and was the 3rd president of the National Assembly from 1996 to 2001. He succeeded Amílcar Spencer Lopes and was succeeded by Aristides Raimundo Lima.

Preceded by Amílcar Spencer Lopes	President of the National Assembly of Cape Verde; 1991–1996	Succeeded by Aristides Lima
