= Víctor Borges =

Cape Verdean politician

Victor Borges

Foreign Minister of Cape Verde
- In office 2004 – 27 June 2008
- President: Pedro Pires
- Preceded by: Fátima Veiga
- Succeeded by: José Brito

Personal details
- Born: 24 May 1955 (age 70); Assomada, Santiago, Portuguese Cape Verde
- Political party: PAICV
- Occupation: Politician

Víctor Manuel Barbosa Borges (born 24 May 1955 in Assomada, Santa Catarina, Santiago) is a Cape Verdean politician. In April 2004, he visited Paris, France. He made another visit to France and met Brigitte Girardin on October 7, 2005. On October 30, 2006, he made his third visit to Paris and signed the Partnership Document. In November 2007, he signed a Special Partnership with the European Union. Borges visited Paris again in 2008 and met with Alain Joyandet, Secretary of State for Cooperation and Francophony and Brice Hortefeux, Minister for Immigration, Integration, National Identity and Development Solidarity. After four years as Minister of Foreign Affairs, he was replaced and left out of the government that was named on 27 June 2008.

Preceded by Fátima Veiga	Foreign Minister of Cape Verde; 2004-2008	Succeeded by José Brito
