= Silvino Manuel da Luz =

Cape Verdean politician and diplomat

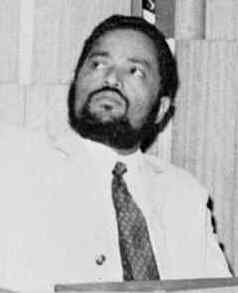

Foreign Minister of Cape Verde
- In office 1981–1991
- President: Aristides Pereira
- Preceded by: Abílio Duarte
- Succeeded by: Jorge Carlos Fonseca

Personal details
- Born: 17 February 1939 (age 87)
- Party: PAICV
- Occupation: Politician

Silvino Manuel da Luz (born 1939) is a former Cape Verdean politician and diplomat. He was born on 17 February 1939 in São Vicente, Cape Verde. Da Luz was the second foreign minister of his country from 1981 to 1991. He succeeded Abílio Duarte and was succeeded by Jorge Carlos Fonseca.

Preceded by Abílio Duarte	Foreign Minister of Cape Verde; 1981-1991	Succeeded by Jorge Carlos Fonseca
