= Eva Verona Teixeira Ortet =

Cape Verdean politician

Eva Verona Teixeira Ortet is a former member of the Pan-African Parliament from Cape Verde.

She is member of the African Party for the Independence of Cape Verde (PAICV).

In the early to mid 2010s, she returned to Cape Verde. From September 2014 to June 22, 2016, she was Minister of Rural Development during the 6th José Maria Neves Cabinet.
