= Jónica Brito =

Cape Verdean politician

Jónica Brito Tavares
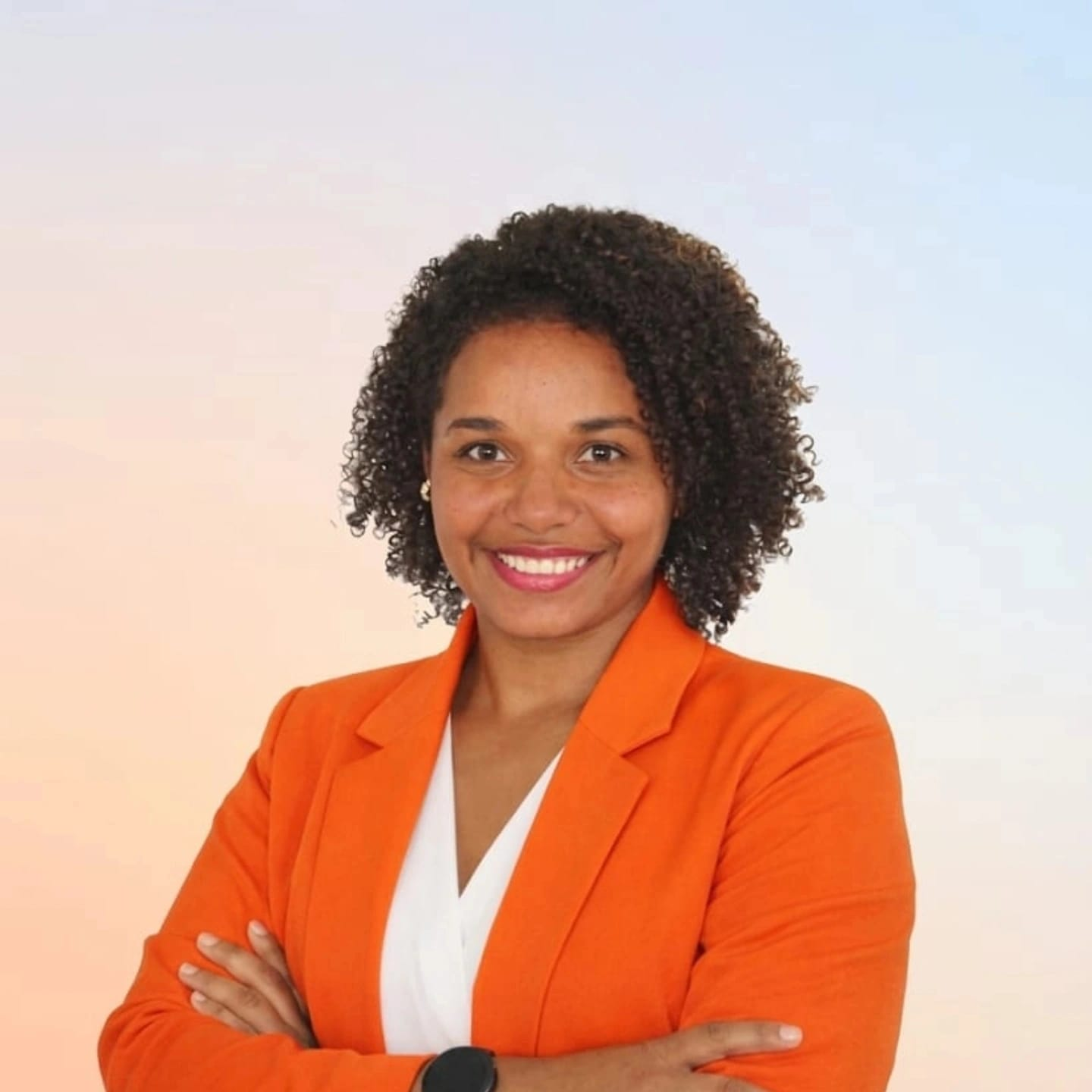
- Brito in 2026.

President of People Work and Solidarity
- In office 2026–present

Vice-president of People Work and Solidarity
- In office 2021–2026

Technical consultant at the Ministry of Industry, Trade and Energy
- Incumbent
- Assumed office 2023

Personal details
- Born: Jónica Brito Tavares; 14 January 1994 (age 32) Praia, Santiago Island, Cape Verde
- Party: PTS
- Education: University of Cape Verde
- Occupation: Politician
- Profession: Technical consultant

Jónica Brito Tavares, publicly known as Jónica Brito (Praia, 14 January 1994), is a Cape Verdean politician and technical consultant. A member of People Work and Solidarity (PTS), she assumed the presidency of the party in 2026, after having served as vice-president of the organisation between 2021 and 2026.

== Early life and career ==
Born in the city of Praia, on the island of Santiago, Jónica Brito Tavares has higher education in the field of International Relations and Diplomacy. In 2021, she was linked to the Faculty of Social Sciences, Humanities and Arts of the University of Cape Verde, in the context of the lists of candidates admitted to the election of student representatives to the University Council.

She completed a degree in International Relations and Diplomacy, a background connected to part of her professional career in Cape Verdean public administration. In 2025, she was selected for the second edition of the master's programme in Applied Economics at the University of Cape Verde.

== Professional career ==
Jónica Brito Tavares developed professional activity in the field of technical consultancy, linked to the sectors of industry, trade and the digital economy. In 2023, she began providing technical consultancy services to the Ministry of Industry, Trade and Energy of Cape Verde through a service contract.

As part of her duties, she took part in international technical capacity-building initiatives related to e-commerce and economic development. In 2023, she attended the Legal Aspects of E-commerce course, promoted by the United Nations Conference on Trade and Development (UNCTAD) through the TrainForTrade programme, and co-presented the case study E-Commerce in Cabo Verde – Strategies and Regulations.

In 2025, she participated in the TrainForTrade SIDS Conference Singapore 2025, a UNCTAD initiative aimed at small island developing states, within the areas of trade, digitalisation and economic development.

== Political career ==
=== Entry into politics ===
Before joining the national leadership of PTS, Jónica Brito Tavares took part in the 2020 municipal electoral cycle, joining the list of LUTA, Liderança União Trabalho e Amor, for the Municipal Assembly of Praia.

=== Vice-presidency of PTS ===
At the 4th National Congress of the then Labour and Solidarity Party, held in August 2021, she was elected vice-president of the party. The congress was part of the internal reorganisation process of the political force, which adopted the name People Work and Solidarity, while retaining the acronym PTS.

In the 2021 legislative elections, she was part of the PTS list for the Santiago Sul constituency, as the second effective candidate. The party obtained 2,065 votes nationally and did not elect any deputies.

=== Presidency of PTS ===
In 2026, in the context of the reorganisation of PTS following the death of Carlos Manuel Lopes, known as Romeu de Lourdes, Jónica Brito Tavares assumed leadership functions in the party. In January of that year, she took part in an audience with the President of the Republic of Cape Verde dedicated to setting the calendar for the 2026 legislative and presidential elections.

The new party leadership was defined at a National Council meeting held in February 2026, in the city of Praia. The structure came to include Jónica Brito Tavares as president, Jailson de Aguiar as vice-president and Jailson Gonçalves da Silva as secretary-general. Her public presentation as president of PTS was reported by Radiotelevisão Caboverdiana in March 2026.

=== 2026 legislative elections ===
In the 2026 legislative elections, Jónica Brito Tavares headed the PTS list for the Santiago Sul constituency. The party presented candidacies in six constituencies, including national and diaspora constituencies.

During the campaign, PTS presented itself as a political alternative to the dominance of the Movement for Democracy (MpD) and the African Party for the Independence of Cape Verde (PAICV). The party's public intervention focused on issues such as social justice, housing, health, employment, inter-island transport, youth, the informal sector, domestic production and the inclusion of the diaspora in national development.

During the electoral period, Jónica Brito Tavares participated in television interviews and debates, including an interview broadcast by Radiotelevisão Caboverdiana in April 2026 and a debate promoted by the same broadcaster in May of the same year.

In the final results proclaimed by the National Electoral Commission, PTS obtained 3,268 votes, corresponding to 1.73% of valid votes, without electing deputies to the National Assembly of Cape Verde.

== See also ==
- People Work and Solidarity
- Politics of Cape Verde
- National Assembly (Cape Verde)
