= Minister of Foreign Affairs (Cape Verde) =

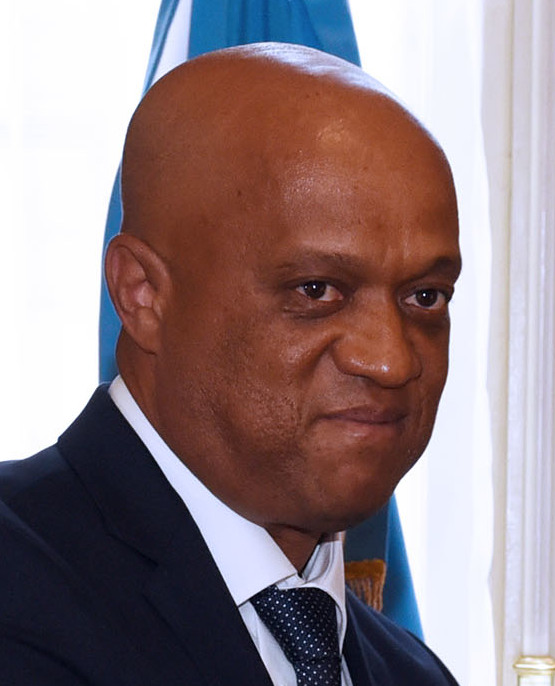
Luís Filipe Tavares, the current Minister of Foreign Affairs of Cape Verde

This is a list of foreign ministers of Cape Verde.

- 1975–1981: Abílio Duarte
- 1981–1991: Silvino Manuel da Luz
- 1991–1993: Jorge Carlos Fonseca
- 1993–1995: Manuel Casimiro de Jesus Chantre
- 1995–1996: José Tomás Veiga
- 1996–1998: Amílcar Spencer Lopes
- 1998–1999: José Luís Jesus
- 1999–2001: Rui Alberto de Figueiredo Soares
- 2001–2002: Manuel Inocêncio Sousa
- 2002–2004: Fátima Veiga
- 2004–2008: Víctor Borges
- 2008–2011: José Brito
- 2011–2014: Jorge Borges
- 2014–2016: Jorge Tolentino
- 2016–2021: Luís Filipe Tavares
- 2021–2024: Rui Alberto de Figueiredo Soares
- 2024–2025: José Filomeno Monteiro
- 2025-Present: José Luís Livramento

== Sources ==
- Rulers.org – Foreign ministers A–D
