= Sinagoga =

- Settlement
- Coordinates: 17.178°N 25.032°W
- Country: Cape Verde
- Island: Santo Antão
- Municipality: Ribeira Grande
- Civil parish: Nossa Senhora do Rosário
- Elevation: 16 m (52 ft)

Population (2010)
  - Total: 603
- ID: 11106

Sinagoga is a settlement in the northeastern part of the island of Santo Antão, Cape Verde. It is situated on the coast, 4 kilometers east of Ribeira Grande and 18 km north-northeast of the island capital Porto Novo. It is situated on the national road connecting Ribeira Grande and Pombas (EN1-SA02).

Its name means "synagogue" in Portuguese. The village was founded by Jewish Miguelist immigrants from the Azores who came to Santa Antao in aftermath of the Liberal Wars in Portugal. Surnames of Jewish origin can still be found in the area.

== Climate ==
Sinagoga has a hot desert climate. The annual rainfall is 291 millimeters. The average annual temperature is 23.4 °C (74.1 °F).

Climate data for Sinagoga, 0 metres ASL
Month	Jan	Feb	Mar	Apr	May	Jun	Jul	Aug	Sep	Oct	Nov	Dec	Year
Mean daily maximum °C (°F)	23.3 (73.9)	23.1 (73.6)	23.6 (74.5)	24.1 (75.4)	24.9 (76.8)	25.6 (78.1)	26.4 (79.5)	27.4 (81.3)	27.6 (81.7)	27.4 (81.3)	26.4 (79.5)	24.3 (75.7)	25.3 (77.5)
Daily mean °C (°F)	21.4 (70.5)	21.2 (70.2)	21.5 (70.7)	21.9 (71.4)	22.7 (72.9)	23.6 (74.5)	24.3 (75.7)	25.4 (77.7)	25.8 (78.4)	25.5 (77.9)	24.4 (75.9)	22.6 (72.7)	23.4 (74.1)
Mean daily minimum °C (°F)	19.6 (67.3)	19.3 (66.7)	19.5 (67.1)	19.8 (67.6)	20.6 (69.1)	21.7 (71.1)	22.3 (72.1)	23.5 (74.3)	24.1 (75.4)	23.7 (74.7)	22.5 (72.5)	21.0 (69.8)	21.5 (70.7)
Average rainfall mm (inches)	14 (0.6)	5 (0.2)	1 (0.0)	0 (0)	0 (0)	0 (0)	11 (0.4)	44 (1.7)	128 (5.0)	44 (1.7)	26 (1.0)	18 (0.7)	291 (11.3)

== See also ==
- List of villages and settlements in Cape Verde
