= Lombo Branco =

- Settlement
- Location within Cape Verde
- Coordinates: 17.168°N 25.038°W
- Country: Cape Verde
- Island: Santo Antão
- Municipality: Ribeira Grande
- Civil parish: Nossa Senhora do Rosário

Population (2010)
  - Total: 422
- ID: 11102

Lombo Branco is a settlement in the northeastern part of the island of Santo Antão, Cape Verde. It is situated 4 km southeast of Ribeira Grande and 17 km north of the island capital Porto Novo.

A notable person who was born in Lombo Branco is António do Espírito Santo Fonseca, who was president of the National Assembly from 1996 to 2001.

== See also ==
- List of villages and settlements in Cape Verde
