= Nossa Senhora do Rosário (Ribeira Grande) =

- Civil parish
- Coordinates: 17.16°N 25.06°W
- Country: Cape Verde
- Island: Santo Antão
- Municipality: Ribeira Grande

Population (2010)
  - Total: 7,361
- ID: 111

Nossa Senhora do Rosário is a freguesia (civil parish) of Cape Verde. It covers the eastern part of the municipality of Ribeira Grande, on the island of Santo Antão.

== Settlements ==
The freguesia consists of the following settlements (population at the 2010 census):

- Fajã Domingas Benta (pop: 693)
- Lombo Branco (pop: 422)
- Lugar de Guene (pop: 717)
- Monte Joana (pop: 138)
- Pinhão (pop: 751)
- Ribeira Grande (pop: 2,564, city)
- Ribeira Grande rural (pop: 1,112)
- Sinagoga (pop: 603)
- Xoxo (pop: 361)
