= João Santos Luís =

Cape Verdean politician

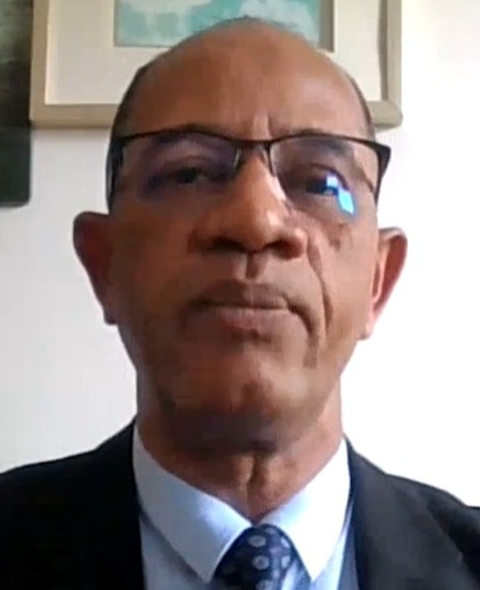

Member of the National Assembly
- Incumbent
- Assumed office 12 October 2022
- Preceded by: Amadeu Oliveira
- Constituency: São Vicente
- In office 11 March 2011 – 18 April 2021
- Constituency: São Vicente

Leader of Democratic and Independent Cape Verdean Union
- Incumbent
- Assumed office 27 March 2022
- Preceded by: António Delgado Monteiro

Personal details
- Born: 19 December 1964 (age 61) São Vicente, Cape Verde
- Party: Democratic and Independent Cape Verdean Union
- Education: University of Mindelo

João dos Santos Luís (São Vicente, 19 December 1964) is a Cape Verdean politician who has served as president of the Democratic and Independent Cape Verdean Union (UCID), the country's third-largest political party, since March 2022. He was a deputy in the National Assembly of Cape Verde from 2011 to 2021, and again since 2022. He was also a member of the São Vicente Municipal Assembly between 2008 and 2012. Before his political career, he worked in the port sector.

== Biography ==
João dos Santos Luís was born in São Vicente, Cape Verde, the son of Augusto Ambrósio Luís and Antónia Maria Fortes, in a family of humble origins. At the age of thirteen he dropped out of school to work at JAPCV (now ENAPOR), but resumed his education at the age of twenty and completed secondary school in 1992. In 2001 he graduated in Maritime Transport Management, Ports and Logistics in Portugal. He later obtained a master's degree in Development Management and International Cooperation from the University of Mindelo in 2010. He developed his professional career in the port sector: he was head of the ENAPOR delegation in Santo Antão from 1996 to 1999, and director of the office of port delegations from 2004 to 2012.

In December 2003, Santos Luís joined the UCID, which was beginning to grow as a political party based in São Vicente. He rose quickly through the ranks, becoming the party's Executive Secretary in 2004. In the 2008 local elections he was elected a member of the São Vicente Municipal Assembly, where he led the UCID bench. In 2009 he was elected vice-president of the party under the leadership of António Delgado Monteiro, a position he held until 2022.

Running as second on the UCID list in the 2011 parliamentary elections, Santos Luís was elected deputy for the São Vicente electoral district, a position in which he was re-elected in 2016. In the 2021 elections he was placed fifth on the UCID list of deputies for São Vicente. The list won 4 seats, so he narrowly failed to be re-elected. On 27 March 2022, Monteiro stepped down as UCID leader during the party's 18th Congress and endorsed Santos Luís as his successor. He was elected unopposed with 135 votes out of 148 delegates present.

Santos Luís took over the leadership of the UCID amid a scandal that shook the party after its deputy Amadeu Oliveira, a lawyer, was detained on charges of helping his client Arlindo Teixeira escape while under house arrest awaiting trial. On 28 July 2022, Oliveira was removed from office by a vote of the National Assembly, which allowed Santos Luís to take his place as deputy on 12 October of the same year.

Santos Luís led the UCID in the 2026 parliamentary elections, the first in which the party competed without Monteiro's leadership. His campaign focused on regional decentralisation and criticism of the two-party system between the PAICV and the MpD. However, the party suffered its first loss of votes in a parliamentary election since democratisation, losing more than half the votes obtained in 2021 and securing only two seats in São Vicente (one of them held by Santos Luís). Santos Luís accepted the result, although he criticised "dirty tactics" by the two main parties and blamed the UCID's poor performance on high abstention.
