= Dulce Almada Duarte =

Cape Verdean linguist and resistance fighter (1933–2019)

- Born: Maria Dulce de Oliveira Almada Duarte; 1933; Mindelo, São Vicente, Cape Verde
- Died: 2019 (aged 85–86)
- Occupation: writer

Maria Dulce de Oliveira Almada Duarte (1933–2019) was a Cape Verdean linguist who was a member and resistance fighter of the African Party for the Independence of Guinea and Cape Verde.

== Biography ==
=== Early life and education ===
Duarte was born in 1933 on the island of São Vicente. She later studied Romance languages at the University of Coimbra. She supported the idea of anticolonialism and supported the independence struggle in Cape Verde and Portuguese Guinea (now Guinea-Bissau).

=== Struggle for resistance ===
She returned to Cape Verde in 1959, but only briefly, as she was not allowed to travel to Portuguese Guinea. Duarte then went to France, where she attended the University of Caen. She later traveled to Algeria, Morocco, Senegal, and finally Guinea, where she joined the African Party for the Independence of Guinea and Cape Verde (PAIGC) directly.

In the struggle for independence, she took on a variety of tasks. She gave a radio interview and co-produced a Portuguese-language radio program intended to demoralize colonial troops and support the resistance fighters. She also wrote a number of articles for the PAIGC publication Libertação (Liberation) and translated the works of Amílcar Cabral into French. She also worked with her future husband, Abílio Duarte, who was likewise a PAIGC fighter.

=== After independence ===
After independence, she worked in different government departments including the Ministry of Culture and Education.

Later, she focused on her original discipline in Romance language and linguistics and published numerous works in Cape Verdean Creole. According to her own statement, she supported the officialization of the Cape Verdean Creole.

== Works ==
- Cabo Verde. Contribuição para o estudo do dialecto falado no seu arquipélago (1961). Lisbon: Junta de Investigações do Ultramar, Issue 55 of Estudos de ciências políticas e sociais.
- Bilinguismo ou Diglossia [Bilingualism or Diglossia] (1998). Praia, Cabo Verde : Spleen.
