= Abílio Duarte =

Cape Verdean nationalist and politician

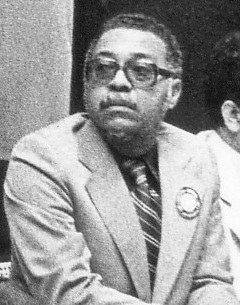

Foreign Minister of Cape Verde
- In office 1975–1981
- President: Aristides Pereira
- Succeeded by: Silvino Manuel da Luz

President of the National Assembly of Cape Verde
- In office 4 July 1975 – 25 February 1991
- President: Aristides Pereira
- Succeeded by: Amílcar Spencer Lopes

Personal details
- Born: 16 February 1931 Praia, Santiago Island, Portuguese Cape Verde
- Died: 20 August 1996 (aged 65)
- Party: PAICV
- Occupation: Politician

Abílio Augusto Monteiro Duarte (16 February 1931 – 20 August 1996) was a Cape Verdean nationalist and early political leader in the independence era.

== Biography ==
He was born in Praia, at the time colonial capital of Cape Verde.

He was educated at Liceu Gil Eanes in Mindelo.

He took part in resistance of colonial rule starting in 1953 and wrote articles related to nationalism including the review Claridade. In February 1956, along with other writers from Angola and Mozambique, he took part in the First Congress of Black Writers in Paris. In 1957, he went to Dakar, Senegal with the militants helping their independence movement in Senegal, later he visited Bissau together with other nationalists. He worked with and was later married to Dulce Almada.

After Cape Verde became independent, Duarte was the President of the National Assembly from 1975 to 1991, and he was the first foreign minister of newly independent Cape Verde from 1975 to 1981, he was succeeded by Silvino Manuel da Luz. He was also President of the People's National Assembly from 1975 to 1991, he was succeeded by Amilcar Spencer Lopes.

He died in August 1996.

== Legacy ==
One of the streets named in Cape Verde is the one in the south of Mindelo.

A secondary school is named after him in Palmarejo in the southwest of Praia located on Avenida Santo Antão, opened in the mid-1990s. Adjacent is the main campus of the University of Cape Verde.

Preceded by Position created	Foreign Minister of Cape Verde; 1975-1981	Succeeded by Silvino Manuel da Luz
Preceded by Position created	President of the National Assembly of Cape Verde; 1975-1991	Succeeded by Amilcar Spencer Lopes
