= Amílcar Spencer Lopes =

Cape Verdean politician (born 1948)

President of the National Assembly of Cape Verde
- In office 25 February 1991 – 30 January 1996
- President: Aristides Pereira; António Mascarenhas Monteiro
- Preceded by: Abílio Duarte
- Succeeded by: António do Espírito Santo Fonseca

Minister of Foreign Affairs
- In office 1996–1998
- President: António Mascarenhas Monteiro
- Prime Minister: Carlos Veiga
- Preceded by: José Tomás Veiga
- Succeeded by: José Luís de Jesus

Personal details
- Born: September 8, 1948 (age 78) Ribeira Brava, São Nicolau, Cape Verde
- Party: MPD
- Education: Faculdade de Direito da Universidade de Lisboa (FDUL)
- Occupation: Politician, Diplomat and Lawyer

Amílcar Spencer Lopes (born September 8, 1948) is a Cape Verdean politician and was the 2nd President of the National Assembly from 1991 to 1996. He succeeded Abílio Duarte and was succeeded by António do Espírito Santo Fonseca. After, he became Minister of Foreign Affairs succeeding José Tomás Veiga. He had the position up to 1998 and was succeeded by José Luís de Jesus. He also held an ambassadorship to the United States for eight days in 1998.

Preceded by Abílio Duarte	President of the National Assembly of Cape Verde; 1991–1996	Succeeded by António do Espírito Santo Fonseca
Preceded by José Tomás Veiga	Foreign Minister of Cape Verde; 1996–1998	Succeeded by José Luís de Jesus
