= Paul Piaget =

Paul Piaget may refer to:

- Paul Piaget (rowing) (1905–?), Swiss rowing coxswain
- Paul Piaget (actor) (1934–1985), Spanish actor
