= Jorge Santos =

Cape Verdean politician

Jorge Santos MP
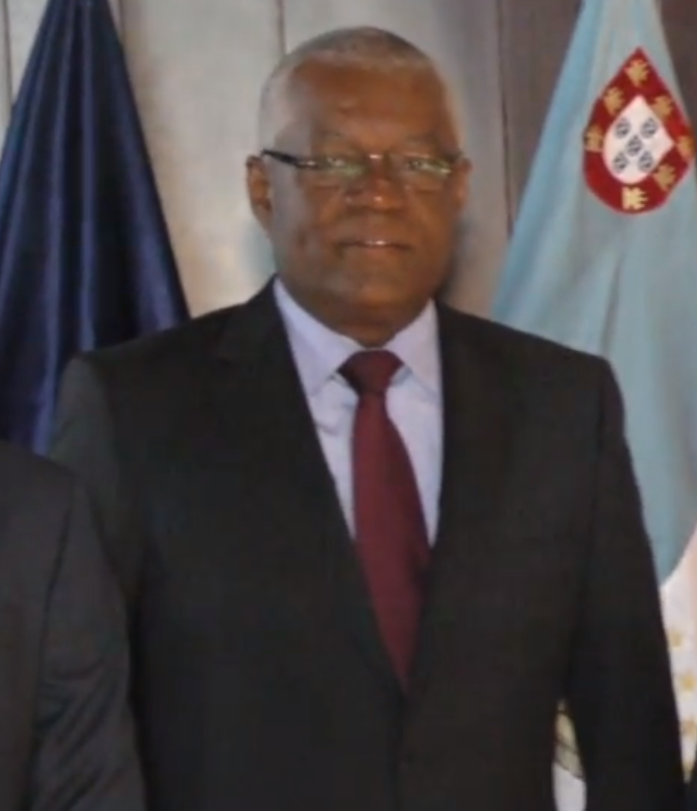

6th President of the National Assembly of Cape Verde
- In office 20 April 2016 – 19 May 2021
- President: Jorge Carlos Fonseca
- Prime Minister: Ulisses Correia e Silva
- Preceded by: Basílio Ramos
- Succeeded by: Austelino Tavares Correia

Personal details
- Born: Jorge Pedro Maurício dos Santos; 15 March 1962 (age 64) Overseas Province of Cabo Verde, Cabo Verde
- Party: Movement for Democracy

Jorge Pedro Maurício dos Santos (born March 15, 1962) is a Cape Verdean politician who served as president of the National Assembly of Cape Verde from 2016 to 2021.

== Political career ==
Jorge Santos is a member of the Movement for Democracy party. Previously Jorge Santos was mayor of the municipality of Ribeira Grande de Santo Antao. After that he served as the second vice president of the National Assembly and Chairman of Movement for Democracy between 2006 and 2009.

Preceded by Basílio Ramos	National Assembly of Cape Verde; 2016-2021	Succeeded by Austelino Tavares Correia
