= Fátima Veiga =

Cape Verdean politician and diplomat

Maria de Fátima da Veiga
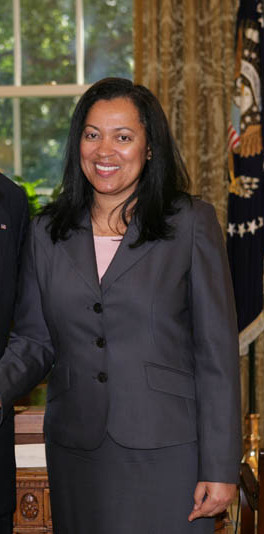

Ambassador of Cape Verde to Cuba
- In office 2001–2002

Minister of Foreign Affairs
- In office 2002–2004
- President: Pedro Pires
- Preceded by: Manuel Inocêncio Sousa
- Succeeded by: Víctor Borges

Ambassador of Cape Verde to the United States

Ambassador of Cape Verde to France
- Incumbent
- Assumed office 2014
- Preceded by: José Armando Filomeno Ferreira Duarte

Personal details
- Born: 22 June 1957 (age 69) Mindelo, São Vicente, Portuguese Cape Verde

Maria de Fátima da Veiga (born June 22, 1957) is a Cape Verdean politician and diplomat. Veiga was the foreign minister from 2002 to 2004. She was the first female foreign minister in Cape Verde's history.

Veiga was born on the island of São Vicente. She later attended some higher education institutes including the University of Aix-en-Provence in the south of France, the German Foundation in Berlin, the Prague and in Brazil. In 1980, she started to work for the Cape Verdean Ministry of External Affairs. Between 2001 and 2002, she was the Ambassador of Cape Verde to Cuba. When she was a foreign minister, she visited Paris from January 9 to 12, 2002.

For a few years in 2007 she was the Ambassador of Cape Verde to the United States. She presented her credentials to President George Bush on August 16, 2007.

Since February 20, 2014, she is the Capeverdean ambassador to France. She succeeded José Armando Filomeno Ferreira Duarte who was the longest serving ambassador to France.

== Notes ==
Political offices
Preceded by Manuel Inocêncio Sousa	Foreign Minister of Cape Verde; 2002–2004	Succeeded by Víctor Borges
Preceded by José Armando Filomeno Ferreira Duarte	Capeverdean Ambassador to France; 2014–present	Succeeded by Incumbent
