= Aristides Lima =

Cape Verdean politician (born 1955)

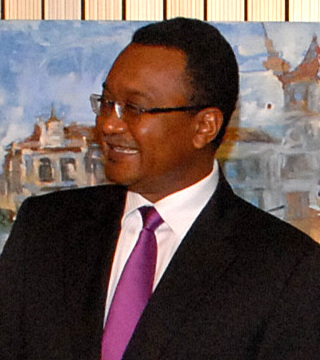

President of the National Assembly of Cape Verde
- In office 13 February 2001 – 11 March 2011
- President: António Mascarenhas Monteiro; Pedro Pires
- Preceded by: António do Espírito Santo Fonseca
- Succeeded by: Basílio Mosso Ramos

Personal details
- Born: Aristides Raimundo Lima; August 31, 1955 (age 70) Boa Vista, Cape Verde
- Party: PAICV
- Occupation: Politician

Aristides Raimundo Lima (born August 31, 1955) is a former Cape Verdean politician and was the 4th president of the National Assembly from 2001 to 2011.

== Biography ==
Aristides Lima was born in the island of Boa Vista. He later studied at the São José Seminary near Ponta Temerosa in Praia and at Liceu Gil Eanes in São Vicente island in 1974.

In 1976, he completed a course at the School of Journalism in Friedrichshagen, Berlin and worked as a journalist at Voz di Povo from 1976 to 1978. In 1983, he went to the University of Leipzig. From 1999 to 2000, he attended the University of Mannheim and later at Heidelberg where he graduated in law. He later attended at the Amílcar Cabral Institute and the National Historic Archives.

In 1985, he became member of the PAICV, he took part in elections in 1991, 1996, 2001 and in 2006.

At a party congress in August 1993, he replaced Pedro Pires and Lima became General Secretary of PAICV.

From 2001 to 2011, he was president of the National Assembly of Cape Verde. He succeeded António do Espírito Santo Fonseca and was succeeded by Basílio Mosso Ramos.

In 2004, he awarded the Order of Merit of the Federal Republic of Germany.

He ran for elections in 2011 as a PAICV member, he was third and received 44,648 votes or 27.71% in the first round.

== Works ==
- "A Importância da Não Reciprocidade e do Tratamento Preferencial dos Países em Vias de Desenvolvimento nas Relações Internacionais e especialmente no Direito Internacional Público, na Perspectiva dos Países em Vias de Desenvolvimento", University of Leipzig,1983
- Reforma política em Cabo Verde [Political Reform in Cape Verde], Praia, 1991
- "Grundzüge des Politischen Reformprozesses in Kapverden", 1992
- Estatuto jurídico-constitucional do Chefe de Estado [Judicial-Constitutional Statute of the Head of State], University of Heidelberg, 2000 (2004)
- Constituição, democracia e direitos humanos: discursos de representação e outros textos [Constitution, Democracy and Human Rights: Speeches of Representation in Other Texts] (February 2004)
- O recurso constitucional alemão e o recurso de ampara Cabo-Verdiano uma análise comparativa (September 2004)
- No Parlamento ao serviço da nação e dos boavistenses [Boa Vistans in Parliament for the Service of the Nation], Alfa-Comunicações, Praia, 2005

Preceded by António do Espírito Santo Fonseca	President of the National Assembly of Cape Verde; 2001–2011	Succeeded by Basílio Mosso Ramos
