= José Brito (Cape Verdean politician) =

Cape Verdean politician

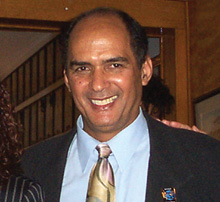
- José Brito

Foreign Minister of Cape Verde
- In office 27 June 2008 – 2011
- President: Pedro Pires
- Preceded by: Víctor Borges
- Succeeded by: Jorge Borges

Personal details
- Born: 19 March 1944 (age 82) Dakar, Senegal (then in French West Africa)
- Occupation: Politician

José Brito (born 19 March 1944) is a Cape Verdean politician.

== Biography ==
Brito was born in Dakar, Senegal (then a French colony) to Cape Verdean parents. Later in his years, he moved to Cape Verde.

Brito holds a bachelor of science in mathematics and master of sciences in physics and chemistry at the University of Abidjan in the Ivory Coast and a high diploma studies in chemical engineering at the Institut français du pétrole in France in 1969. He held a position of a Technical Manager of the Oil Refinery of Abidjan (SIR) (1969-1975) and Minister of Planning and Foreign Aid of the Republic of Cabo Verde (1977-1991). From 1992 to 1996, Brito managed the program “African Futures” in Abidjan financed by UNDP. Brito worked as vice-president of governmental relations for Ocean Energy, Oil Company in Texas, USA from 1997 to 2001.

From 2001 to 2006, he served as Cape Verde's ambassador to the United States, Canada, and Mexico, before taking up the position of Minister of Economy, Growth and Competitiveness from 2006 to 2008. He was the Minister of Foreign Affairs of the nation of Cabo Verde from 2008 to 2011. Brito is currently the co-founder and managing partner of Bonako, a business development and advisory firm in Cape Verde. He is also co-founder and co-director of the Africa Innovation Summit, a platform for promoting innovation in Africa.

== See also ==
- Foreign relations of Cape Verde

Preceded by Víctor Borges	Foreign Minister of Cape Verde; 2008-2011	Succeeded by Jorge Borges
