= Cavaleiros do Forró =

Brazilian Forró band

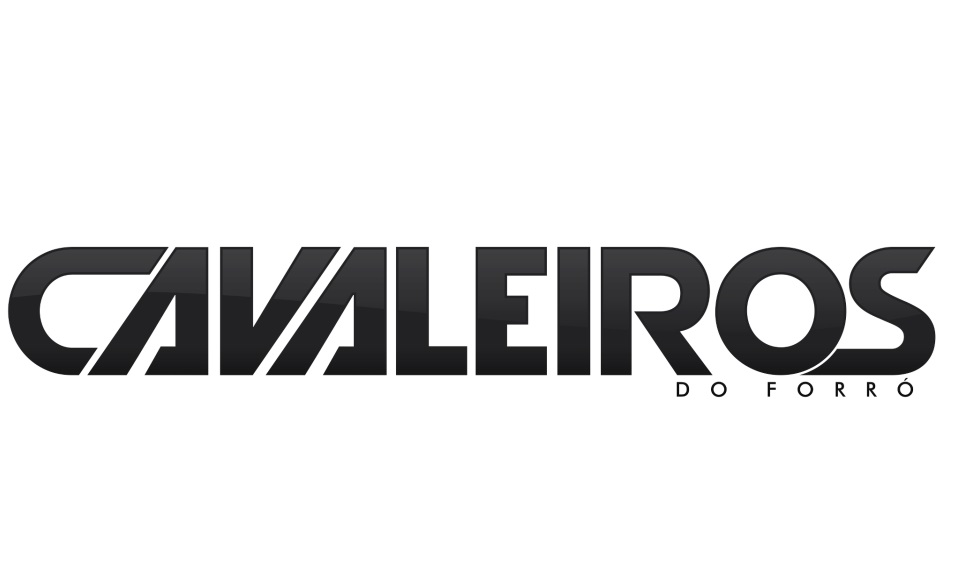

Background information
- Origin: Natal, Rio Grande do Norte
- Genres: Forró
- Years active: 2001–present
- Label: Independent record label
- Members: Jaílson Santos; Ramon Costa
- Website: cavaleirosdoforro.com

Cavaleiros do Forró is a Brazilian Forró band formed in Natal, Rio Grande do Norte, in 2004. The group has sold more than 2.5 million albums.

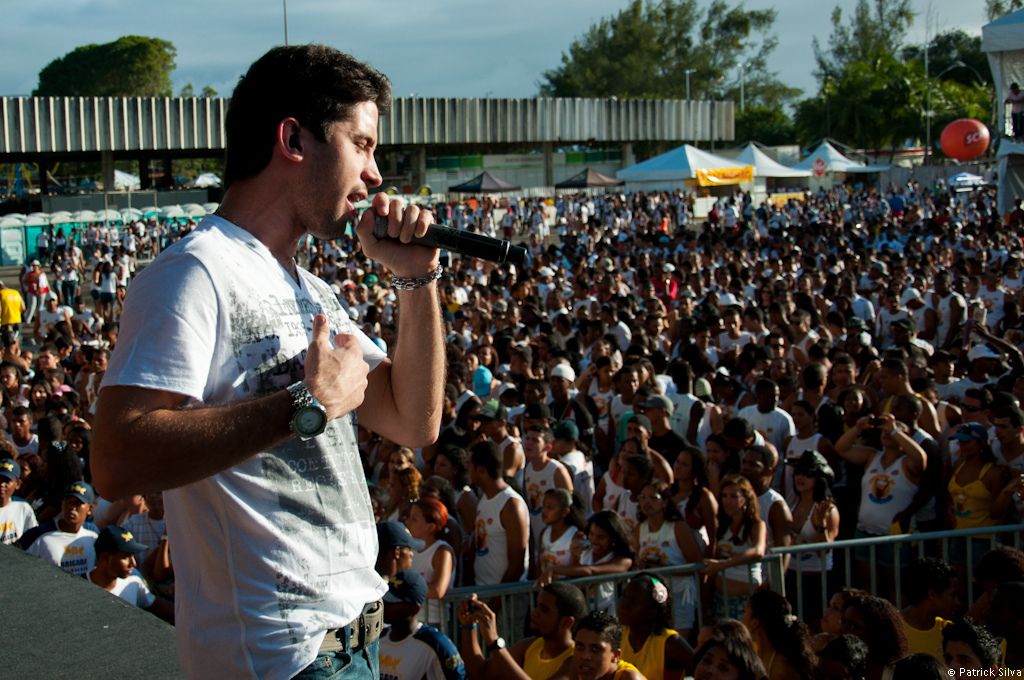
Cavaleiros do Forró in 2011 Choppada de Medicina

== Discography ==
Year	Album	Sales	Certification (Sales/shipments)
2001	Botando Pressão – Vol. 1: Released: November 2001; Record label: Independent record label	—	—
2002	O Karatê – Vol. 2: Released: 2002; Record label: Independent record label	—	—
2003	4 Estilos – Vol. 3: Released: 2003; Record label: Independent record label	—	—
2004	Nossa História, Nosso Acústico: Released: 2004; Record label: Independent record label	—	—
2005	Meio a Meio - Vol. 4: Released: 2005; Record label: Independent record label	—	—
2005	O Filme ao vivo em Natal: Released: 2005; Record label: Independent record label	250,000	2× Platinum
2006	No Reino dos Cavaleiros – Vol. 5: Released: January 2006; Record label: Independent record label	—	—
2006	O Filme 2 - No Reino dos Cavaleiros: Released: April 22, 2006; Record label: Independent record label	150,000	Platinum
2007	Forrozada - Volume 6: Released: 2007; Record label: Independent record label	500,000	2× Diamond
2007	Ao Vivo em Caruaru: Released: August 26, 2007; Record label: Independent record label	150,000	Diamond
2007	Cavaleiros Elétrico – Ao Vivo em Feira de Santana: Released: August 26, 2007; Record label: Independent record label	50,000	Platinum
2008	Beber e Amar - Vol. 7: Released: 2008; Record label: Independent record label	—	—
2008	Cavaleiros do Forró – Ao Vivo em Maceió: Released: 2008; Record label: Independent record label	—	—
2010	Cavaleiros do Forró - Volume 8: Released: 2010; Record label: Independent record label	—	—
2011	Ao vivo em Aracajú: Released: August 2011; Record label: Independent record label	—	—
2012	Cavaleiros Universitário: Released: December 2011; Record label: Independent record label	—	—
2014	12 Anos – Uma Nova História "Ao Vivo": Released: 2014; Record label: Independent record label	140,000	—
