= Contacto (Luxembourg) =

Portuguese-language newspaper in Luxembourg

- Type: Weekly
- Publisher: Mediahuis
- Founded: 1970
- Language: Portuguese language
- Headquarters: Luxembourg
- Circulation: 8,000
- Website: www.jornal-contacto.lu

Contacto (Portuguese pronunciation: [kõˈtaktu], lit. 'Contact') is a Portuguese language weekly tabloid newspaper in Luxembourg published by the Mediahuis group. The newspaper was founded in 1970. As of the early 2000s, it was the largest Portuguese newspaper in the country, with a weekly circulation of around 8,000.

The paper caters to the large Lusophone community in Luxembourg, primarily Portuguese and Cape Verdean Luxembourgers.
