= José Luís Livramento =

Cape Verde politician

Minister of Foreign Affairs
- Incumbent
- Assumed office 29 October 2025
- Preceded by: José Filomeno Monteiro

José Luís do Livramento Monteiro Alves de Brito is a Cape Verdean politician who has been Minister of Foreign Affairs since 2025. He replaced José Filomeno Monteiro who stood down due to ill health.

== Career ==
Between 1995 and 1999, he was Minister of Education, Science and Culture, Minister of Education, Youth and Sports, and Secretary of State for the Economy, in addition to serving as a National Deputy. He served as Cape Verdean Ambassador to the United States for five years.
