= Basílio Ramos =

Cape Verdean politician

Basílio Ramos MP
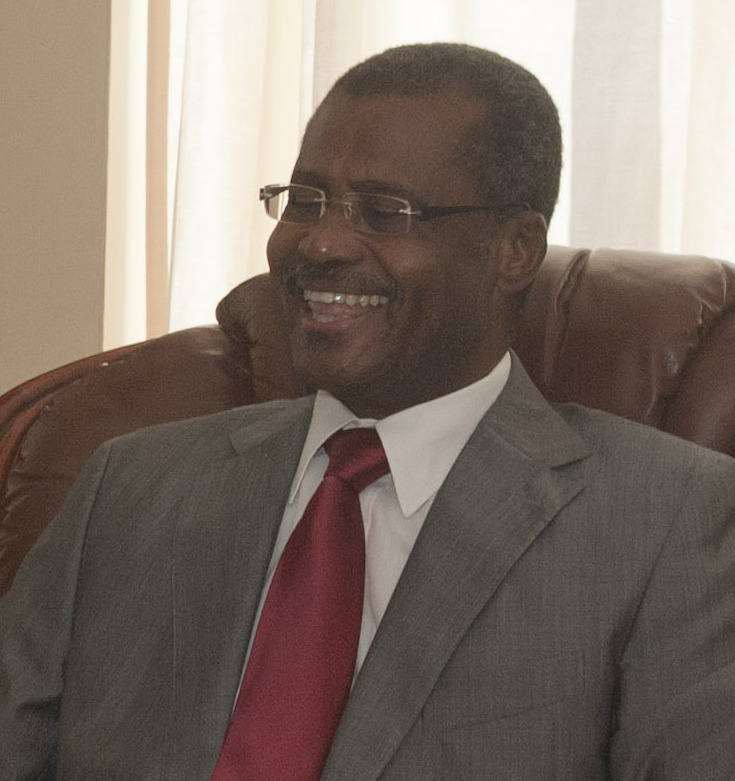
- Basílio Ramos in 2012

5th President of the National Assembly of Cape Verde
- In office 11 March 2011 – 20 April 2016
- President: Pedro Pires; Jorge Carlos Fonseca
- Prime Minister: José Maria Neves
- Preceded by: Aristides Lima
- Succeeded by: Jorge Pedro Mauricio dos Santos

Personal details
- Born: Basílio Mosso Ramos; 17 January 1952 (age 74) Sal Island, Overseas Province of Cabo Verde, Cabo Verde
- Party: African Party for the Independence of Cape Verde
- Education: Catholic University of Louvain

Basílio Mosso Ramos (born January 17, 1952) is a Cape Verdean politician who was the 5th president of the National Assembly of Cape Verde from 2011 to 2016.

He came to politics as a PAICV member.

He went to several European universities including the Catholic University of Louvain (or Leuven) where he studied sociology and later received his alma mater and the University of Lisbon.

He was the Cape Verdean deputy and minister of Health in 2002. He later became the 5th president of the National Assembly from 11 March 2011 to 20 April 2016. He succeeded Aristides Lima and was succeeded by Jorge Pedro Mauricio dos Santos.

Political offices
| Preceded by Aristides Lima | President of the National Assembly of Cape Verde; 2011-2016 | Succeeded by Jorge Pedro Mauricio dos Santos |
