= Rui Semedo =

Cape Verdean politician (born 1956)

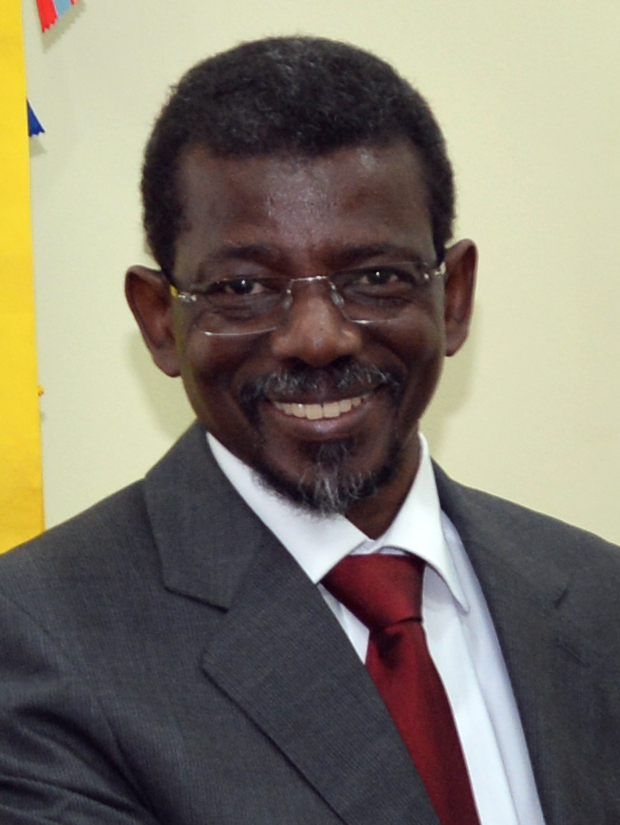
- Semedo in 2015

President of the African Party for the Independence of Cape Verde
- In office 20 December 2021 – 25 May 2025
- Preceded by: Janira Hopffer Almada
- Succeeded by: Francisco Carvalho

Personal details
- Born: Rui Mendes Semedo; 7 October 1956 (69 years) Cape Verde
- Party: African Party for the Independence of Cape Verde

Rui Mendes Semedo (born 7 October 1956) is a professor and politician from Cape Verde who served as the president of the African Party for the Independence of Cape Verde (PAICV) from December 2021 to May 2025.

Semedo served as Minister of Parliamentary Affairs from 2011 to 2014, and Minister of National Defense from 2014 to 2016.
