= Rui Alberto de Figueiredo Soares =

Cape Verdean politician (born 1956)

Minister of Foreign Affairs
- In office 1999–2002
- President: António Mascarenhas Monteiro; Pedro Pires
- Preceded by: José Luís de Jesus
- Succeeded by: Manuel Inocêncio Sousa

Personal details
- Born: 1956 (age 68–69)
- Occupation: Politician

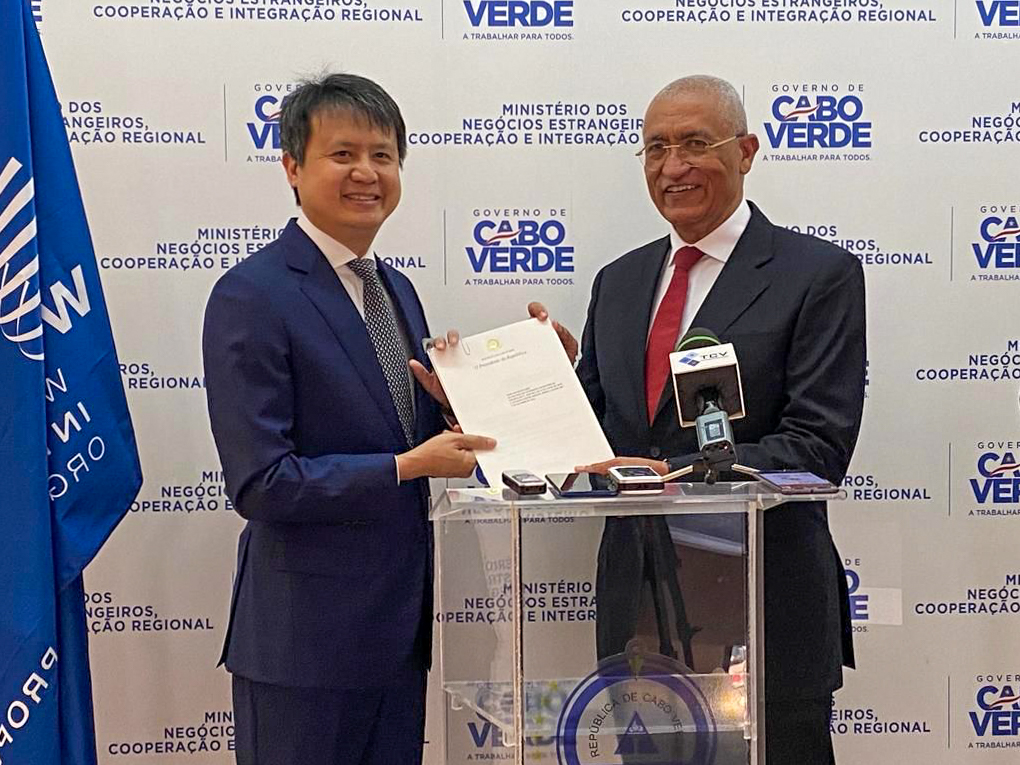
Rui Alberto de Figueiredo Soares, Cabo Verde's Minister of Foreign Affairs, Cooperation and Regional Integration in April 2022

Rui Alberto de Figueiredo Soares (born 1956) is a Cape Verdean politician. Figueiredo Soares served as foreign minister of Cape Verde under President António Mascarenhas Monteiro from 12 August 1999 – 2002. He was elected to the National Assembly from São Vicente under the Movement for Democracy in the 2006 parliamentary election.

Political offices
Preceded by José Luís de Jesus	Foreign Minister of Cape Verde; 1999–2002	Succeeded by Manuel Inocêncio Sousa
