= Abraão Vicente =

Cape Verdean politician

Abraão Aníbal Fernandes Barbosa Vicente
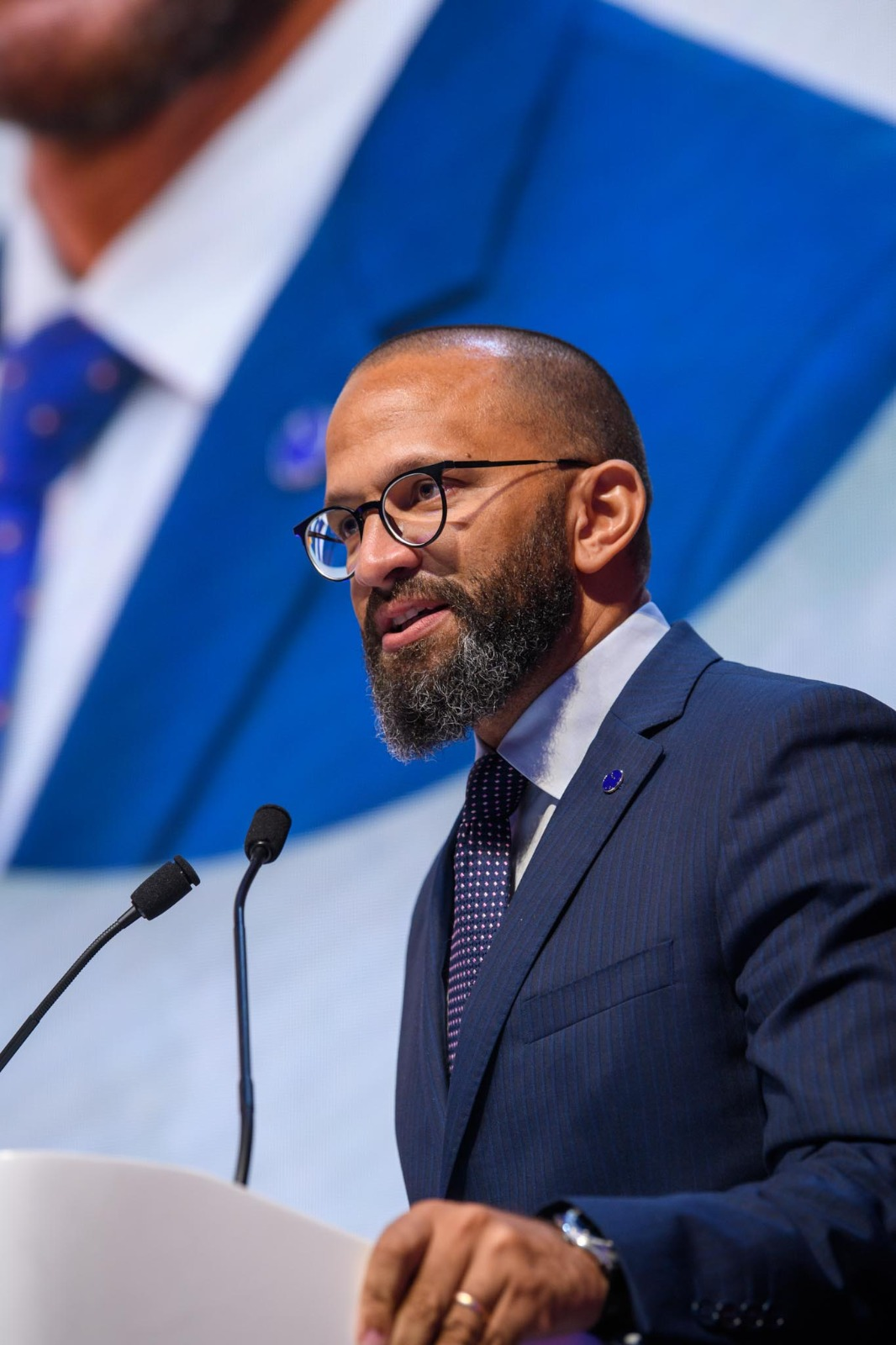
- Vicente speaking at the EurAfrica Forum in Lisbon, August 2023.

Member of the National Assembly (2011 – present).

Minister of Culture and Creative Industries (April 2016 – August 2024).

Minister of the Sea (6 December 2021 – August 2024).

President of the National Commission of UNESCO of Cape Verde (2016 – 2021).

Personal details
- Born: February 26, 1980 (age 46) Assomada, Santa Catarina, Santiago Island, Cape Verde
- Party: MpD
- Spouse: Stephanie Barbosa Vicente (m. 2018)
- Children: 4
- Education: NOVA University Lisbon (Degree in Sociology)
- Occupation: Member of Parliament
- Profession: Sociologist, politician and public thinker, writer, visual artist and communicator. Founder and host of the podcast “Os Bastidores do Sucesso”.

Abraão Aníbal Fernandes Barbosa Vicente (born 26 February 1980, Assomada) is a Cape Verdean politician, sociologist, writer and visual artist. He was Minister of Culture and Creative Industries between 2016 and 2024 and also held the portfolio of the Sea from December 2021 to August 2024. He is currently a member of parliament for the MpD.

== Early life and education ==
He was born in Assomada, in the municipality of Santa Catarina, on the island of Santiago. He studied in Assomada and later in the city of Praia and, at the age of eighteen, moved to Lisbon, where he graduated in Sociology at the NOVA University Lisbon.

== Professional career ==
Before entering politics, he presented television programmes such as Casa da Cultura (2006–2008) and 180 Graus (2008–2009) on TCV, and was a journalist, columnist and editor of the newspaper A Nação (2008–2010). He was also presenter of the magazine Nha Terra Nha Cretcheu, broadcast on RTP África.

== Political activity ==
He was elected member of parliament in 2011 and re-elected in 2021.

In April 2016 he took office as Minister of Culture and Creative Industries, also overseeing the media sector until 2021. On 6 December 2021 he was appointed Minister of the Sea, accumulating functions until 7 August 2024, the date of his dismissal published in the Official Bulletin.

During his tenure at the Ministry of Culture and Creative Industries he promoted the Bolsa de Acesso à Cultura (BA-Cultura) programme, focused on access for children and young people to arts education, and oversaw the project for the rehabilitation and expansion of the National Centre for Art, Crafts and Design (CNAD), inaugurated in 2022 in Mindelo.

In the field of cultural heritage, Cape Verde saw morna inscribed on the UNESCO Representative List of the Intangible Cultural Heritage of Humanity in 2019, a process led by the Cape Verdean state through the Ministry of Culture and Creative Industries.

== Published works ==
- O trampolim (short stories), Kankan Studio, 2010.
- e de repente a noite (poetry), Kankan Studio, 2011.
- Traços Rosa Choque (chronicles), Lua de Marfim, 2012.
- 1980 Labirintos (prose poetry), Lua de Marfim, 2013.
- Amar 100 Medo: cartas improváveis & outras letras (poetry), self-published, 2014.
- A Feiticeira de Fonte Lima (children's book), Plátano Editora, 2017.
- Contributor in the collection Dez Contos para Ler Sentado (Caminho, 2012).

== Personal life ==
He married Stephanie Barbosa Vicente in 2018. He is father of four children; the Portuguese press reported the birth of a daughter, Nina Vicente, from his relationship with singer Lura, joining a son, Martin Vicente.
