= Livramento, Paraíba =

Coordinates: 7°22′26″S 36°56′45″W

- Municipality
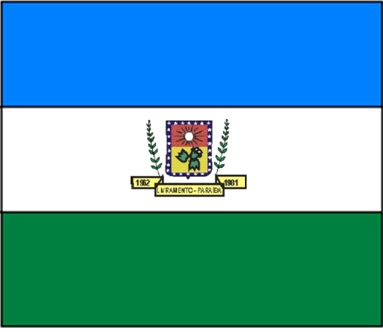
- Flag Coat of arms
- Interactive map of Livramento, Paraíba
- Country: Brazil
- Region: South
- State: Paraíba
- Mesoregion: Boborema

Population (2020)
  - Total: 7,265
- Time zone: UTC−3 (BRT)

Livramento (Central northeastern portuguese pronunciation: [livɾɐˈmẽtu]) is a municipality in the state of Paraíba in the Northeast Region of Brazil.

== See also ==
- List of municipalities in Paraíba
