= Jean Piaget University of Angola =

University based in Luanda, Angola

Coordinates: 8.908°S 13.401°E

- Universidade Jean Piaget de Angola
- Type: Private
- Established: 2000; 26 years ago
- Location: Viana, Luanda

The Jean Piaget University of Angola (Portuguese: Universidade Jean Piaget de Angola) is a private university based in Luanda, Angola, with campuses in the Benguela province. It is named after the Swiss philosopher Jean Piaget.

== History ==
The university was founded in 1999.

As of 2005, the university had 815 enrolled students and is one of seven state recognized universities, both private and public, in the country.

== Faculties offered ==
It currently offers the following faculties:

- Law
- Economics and Management
- Computer sciences
- Sociology
- Civil engineering
- Nursing
- Medicine
- Electromec engineering
- Petroleum sciences

The university currently has 17 undergraduate and 5 postgraduate courses.

== Planned expansion ==
An estimated 8 million USD are planned to be spent in an upcoming university expansion project that will add four buildings with three floors each, in an area of 35 hectares to accommodate 2,500 students.

== See also ==
- Jean Piaget University of Cape Verde
