= Jorge Tolentino =

Cape Verdean defence minister

Jorge Tolentino (born 1963) is a Cape Verdean politician, writer, diplomat and lawyer. He served as the Minister of Defense and Minister of Foreign Affairs.

== Background and education ==
Tolentino was born in Mindelo, St. Vicente Island, Cape Verde. He received a bachelor’s degree in Law from the University of Coimbra in Portugal.

== Career ==
Tolentino has held various positions in the government. He was an Advisor to the former President of Cape Verde Antonio Mascarenhas Monteiro. He has represented Cape Verde in Finland, Spain, Czech Republic and Germany. He is also an Author and he holds positions in the Cape Verdean Writers Association.
