= Jean Piaget University of Cape Verde =

Private university in Cape Verde

- Universidade Jean Piaget de Cabo Verde
- Type: Private university
- Established: 7 May 2001; 25 years ago
- Rector: Wlodzimierz Szymaniak (interim)
- General Administrator: Rosely Rocha
- Academic staff: 380
- Students: about 2,000
- Location: Praia, Cape Verde; 14.9215°N 23.5375°W
- Website: unipiaget.edu.cv
- Location within Cape Verde

The Jean Piaget University of Cape Verde (Portuguese: Universidade Jean Piaget de Cabo Verde) is a private university in Cape Verde. It was established on 7 May 2001, and now has about 2,000 students and 380 academic staff.

The main campus is in the capital city Praia (Palmarejo subdivision) on the island of Santiago, with a smaller second location in Mindelo on the island of São Vicente, opened in 2005. Jean Piaget University offers both undergraduate and graduate degrees, as well as continuing education courses.

== Faculties ==
- Science and Technology
- Health Science and Environment
- Political Science
- Economy and Commerce

=== Praia Campus ===
- Architecture
- Biology
- Civil Construction Engineering
- Clinical Analyses and Public Health
- Communications Sciences
- Countability, Auditory and Business Enterprises
- Electotechnical Engineering and Industrial Management
- Ecology and Development
- Ecology and Management
- Educational Sciences
- Hotel and Touristic Management
- Management Information
- Nursing
- Pharmaceutical Sciences
- Physiotherapy
- Public Administration and Autarchy
- Social Services
- Sociology
- Systems and Informative Engineering
- Tradition and Multicultural

=== Mindelo Campus ===
- Architecture
- Educational Sciences
- Management Information
- Public Administration and Autarchy
- Social Services
- Systems and Informative Engineering

=== High Professional Studies Course ===
- Development on Web and Mobile Applications
- Masotherapy
- Health Community and Endemic Control

== Rectors ==
- Marco Ribeiras Limas (in 2012)
- Osvaldo Borges (in 2013 and 2014)
- Jorge Sousa Brito (2014–2017)
- Wlodzimierz Szymaniak (since 2017)

== See also ==
- University of Cape Verde
- Jean Piaget University of Angola – sister campus on the African mainland
