= List of female justice ministers =

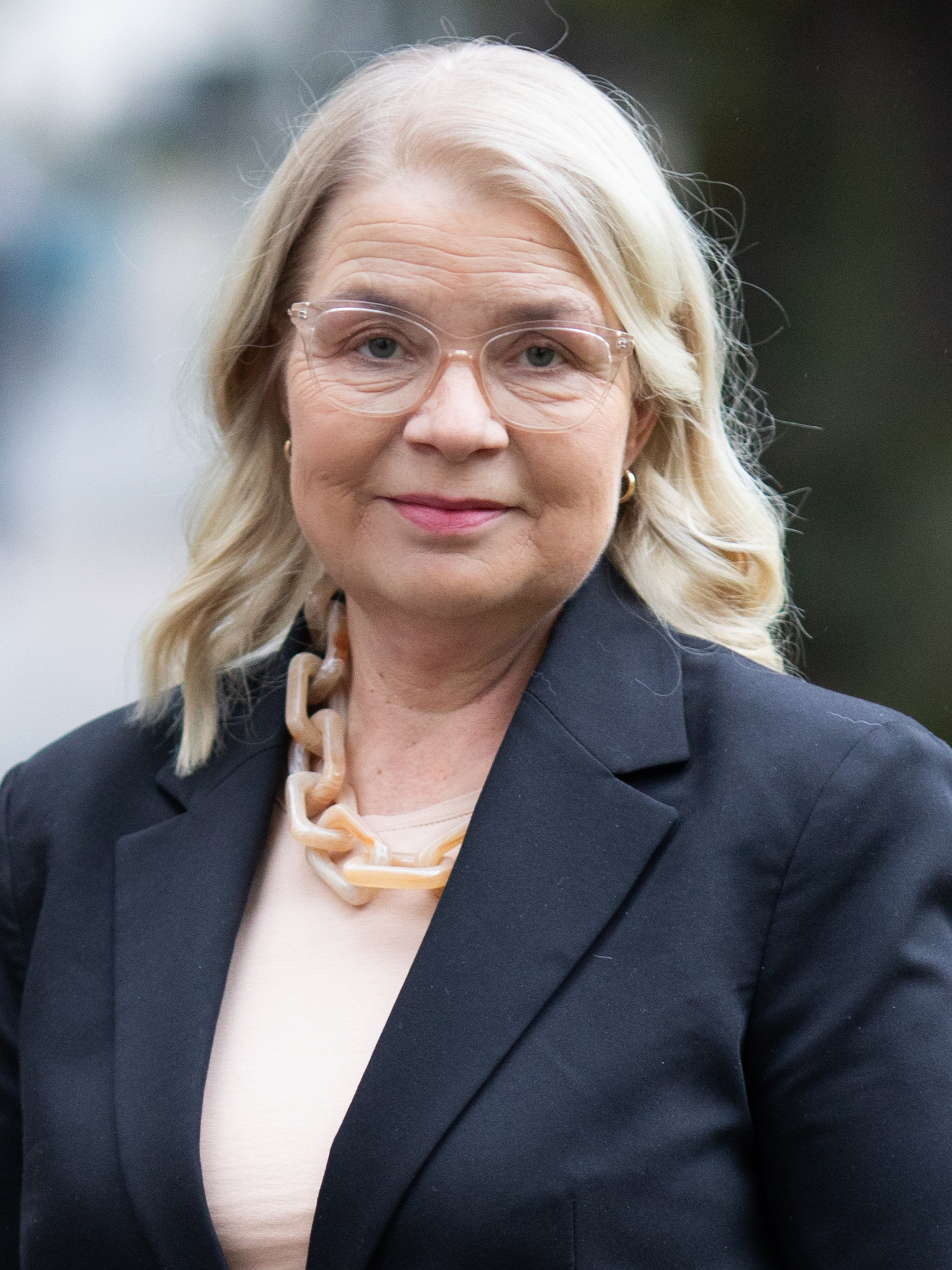
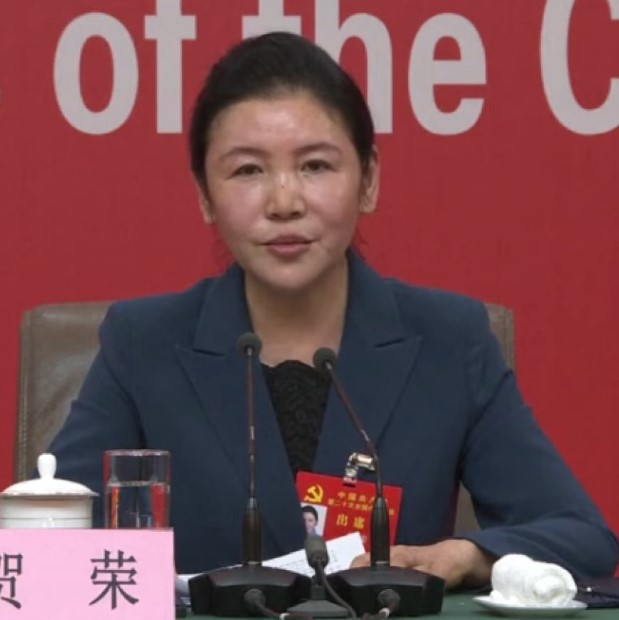
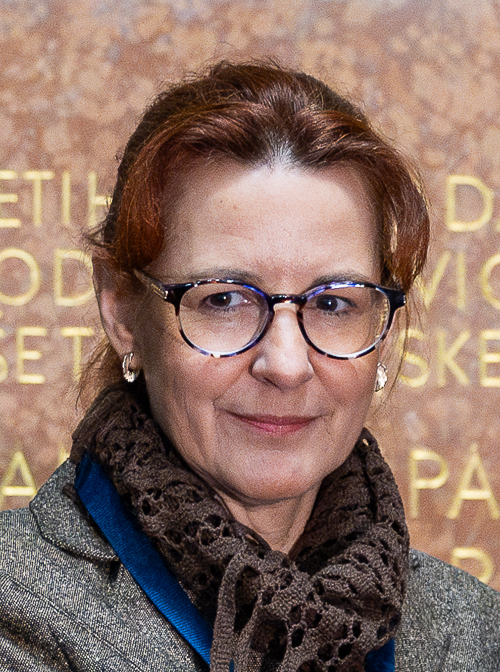
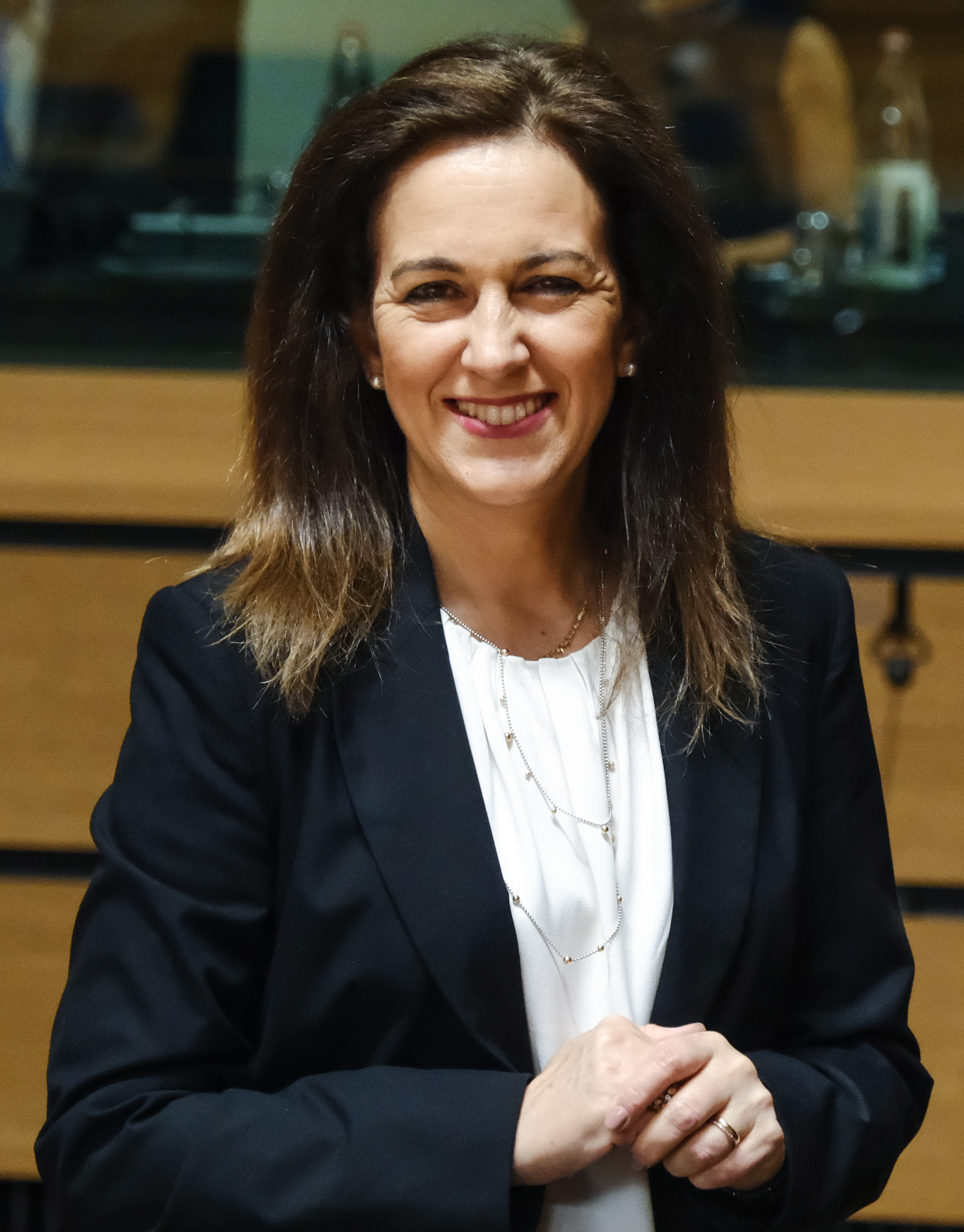
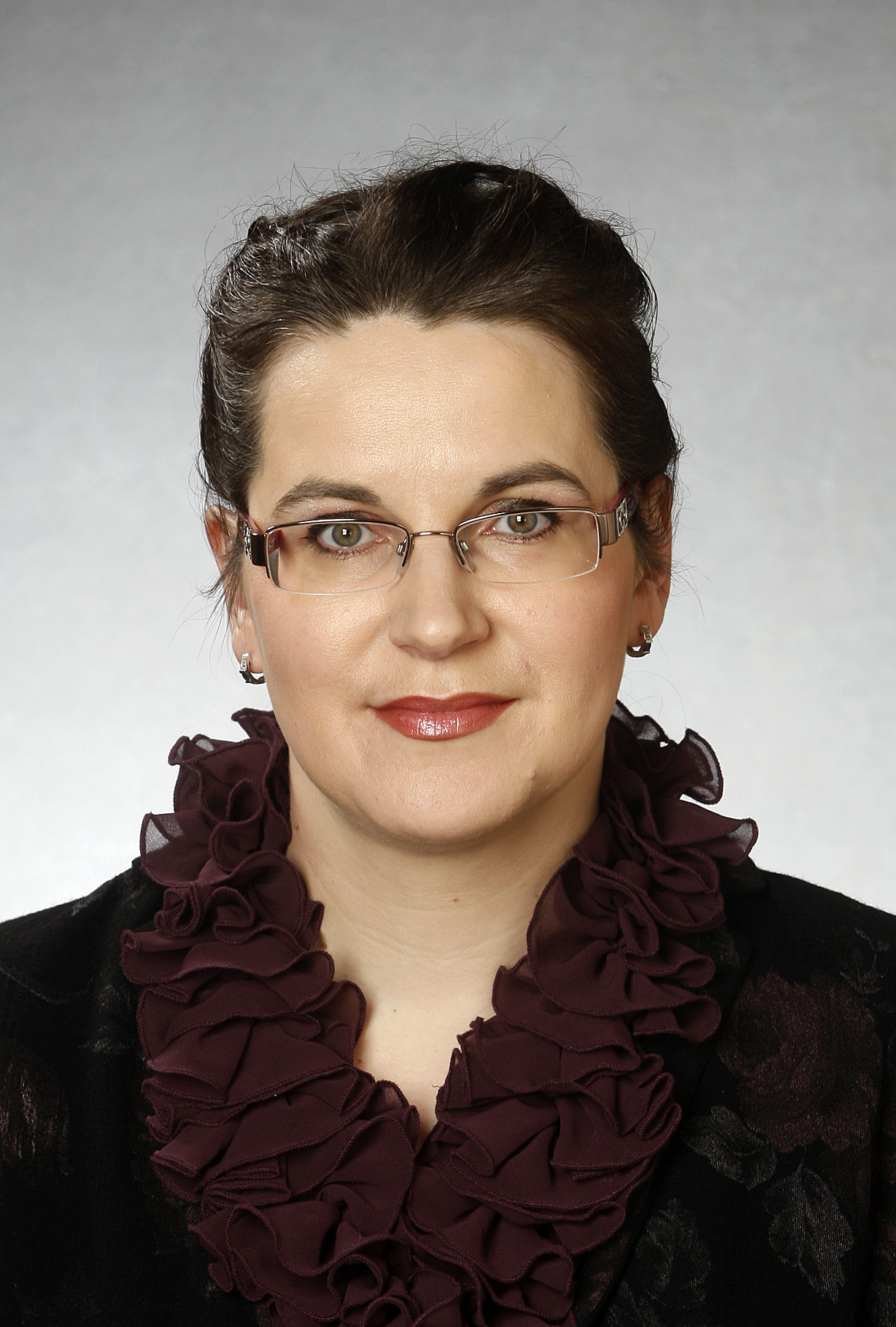
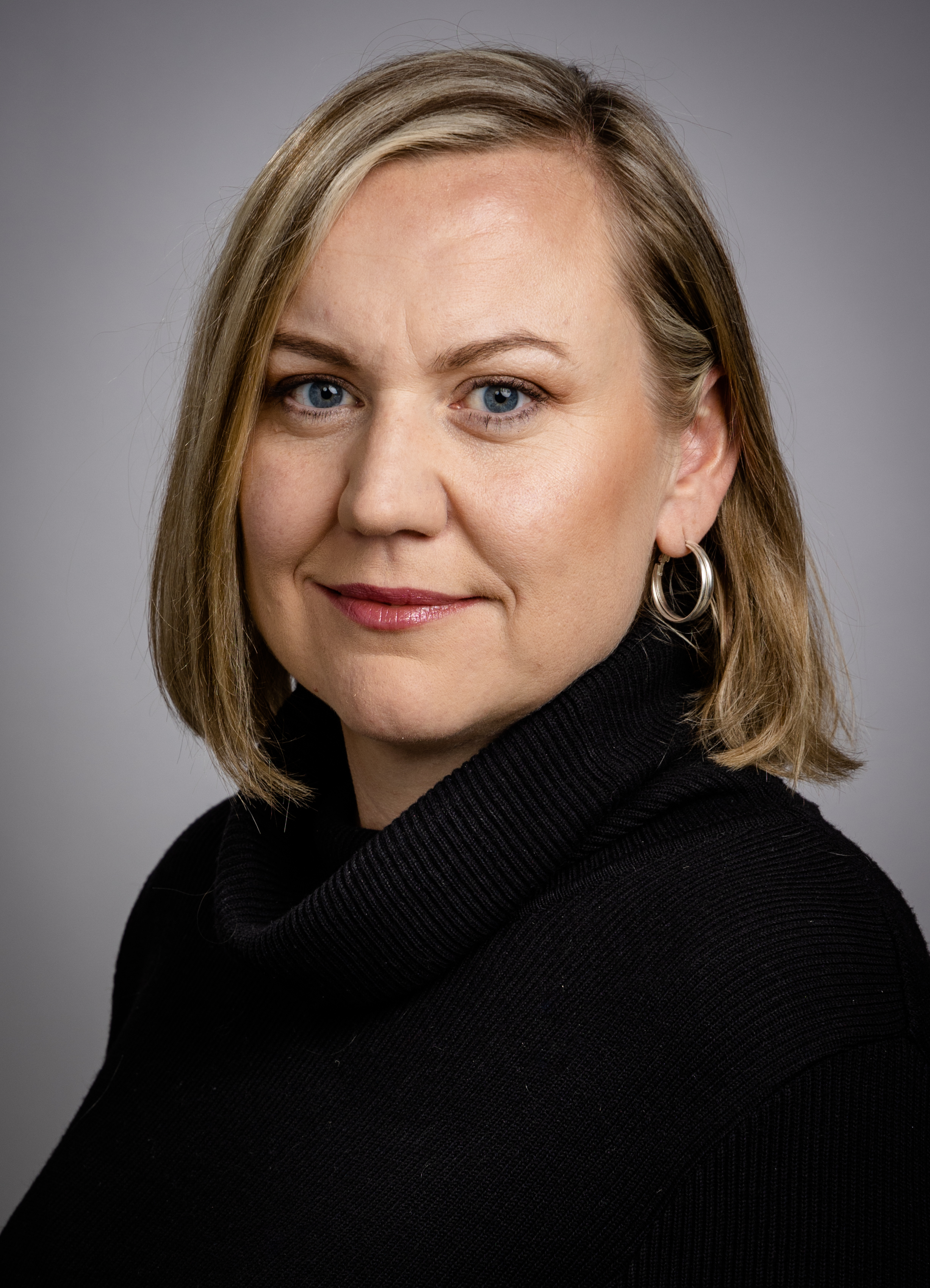
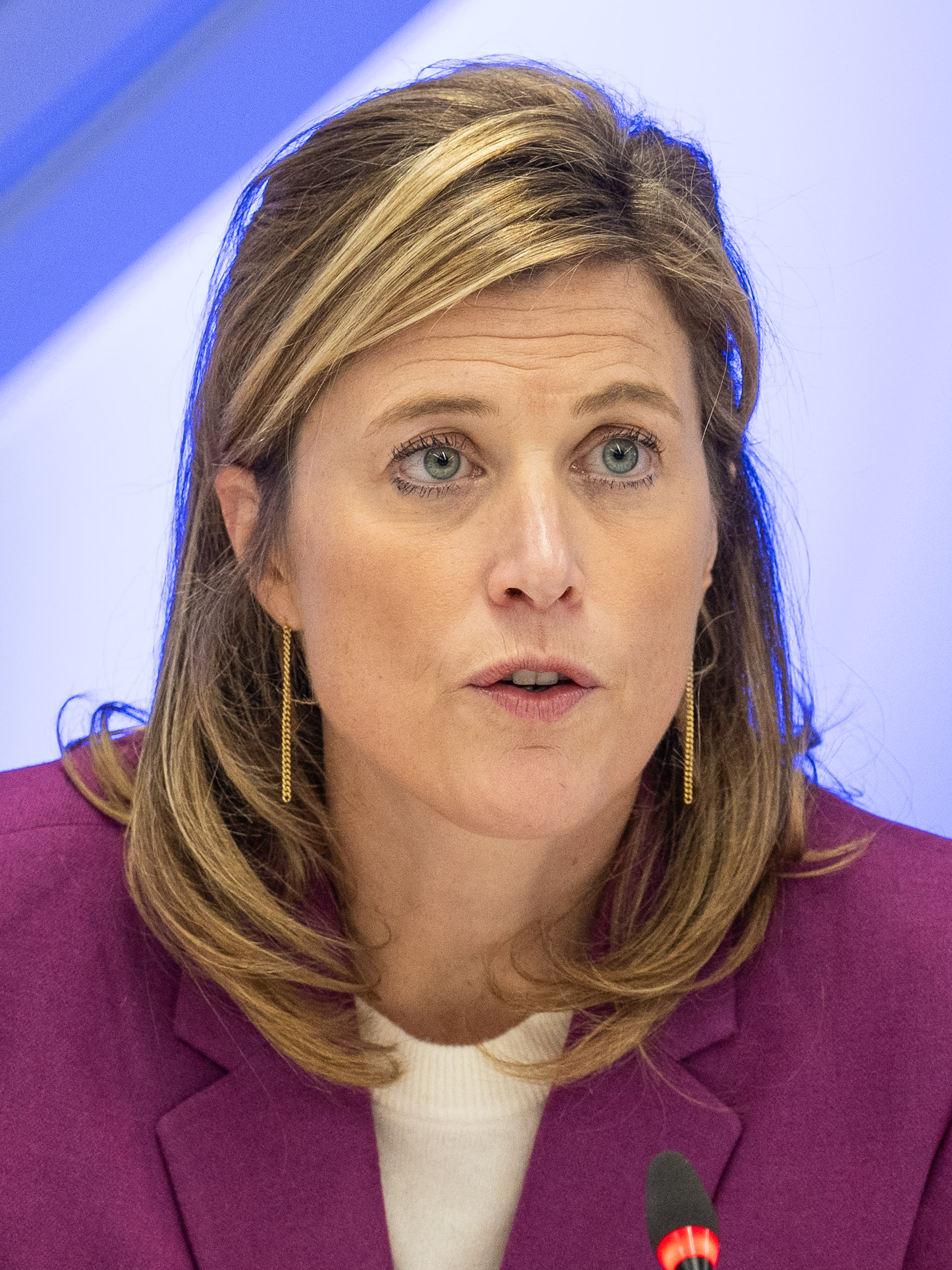
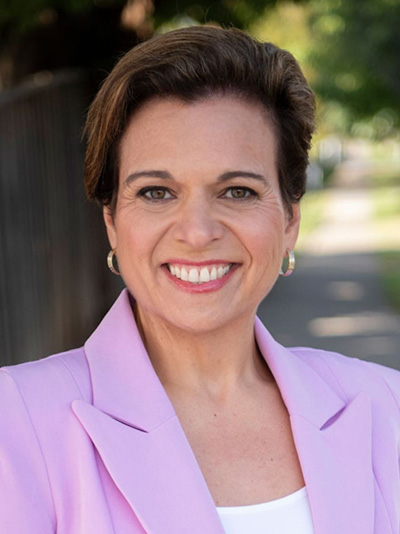
Incumbent female justice ministers of various countries
- Top row, from left to right:
  - Leena Meri, Minister of Justice of Finland
  - He Rong, Minsiter of Justice of China
  - Andreja Katič, Minister of Justice of Slovenia
- Middle row, from left to right:
  - Rita Júdice, Minister of Justice of Portugal
  - Astri Aas-Hansen, Minister of Justice and Public Security of Norway
  - Liisa Pakosta, Minister of Justice and Digital Affairs of Estonia
- Bottom row, from left to right:
  - Þorbjörg Sigríður Gunnlaugsdóttir, Minister of Justice of Iceland
  - Annelies Verlinden, Minister of Justice of Belgium
  - Michelle Rowland, Attorney-General of Australia

Worldwide, 272 women have overseen a ministry of justice or analogous government agency (Note: Specific names for the governmental agency in charge of administration of justice vary by country. For example, this body is called the Department of Justice in the United States. Likewise, this agency is called the Office of the Attorney General in Myanmar.) responsible for executing a country's legal system. (Note: Not all countries have a ministry of justice, as is the case with Monaco.) Of that number, 146 women have been in charge of ministries of justice or analogous agencies in Europe, 39 have been in North America, 27 women have been in Africa, 27 women have been in Asia, 18 women have been in South America, and 12 women have been in Oceania.

Adriana Olguín became the first female justice minister worldwide upon becoming Chile's minister of justice and human rights on 29 July 1952. Five years later, Ho Jong-suk became the first female justice minister in Asia, serving in this role in North Korea. In 1960, Stella Soulioti became the first female European justice minister as Minister of Justice and Public Order of Cyprus. North America would see the first woman serve in such a role when Yolanda Myers de Vásquez assumed charge of El Salvador's Public Ministry in 1967. Twenty-nine years later, Hawa Sisay-Sabally became Minister of Justice of The Gambia, the first such minister in Africa. Finally, Hilda Lini became the first minister of justice in Oceania in 1996 upon becoming Minister of Justice of Vanuatu.

Norway is the country with the most female justice ministers, with 15 ministers of justice and public security. In contrast, various countries, such as Lebanon and Samoa, have only had one female justice minister or equivalent political officeholder.

The totals for this list include only female justice ministers or equivalents of sovereign states. Acting justice ministers, as well as administrators of justice of dependent territories and subnational entities, are excluded from this article.

== African ministers ==
The following list includes all women who have served as national justice ministers or analogous governmental officials in Africa. Politicians are listed based on the starting dates of their tenures.

denotes an incumbent justice minister or equivalent officeholder

Name	Image	Country	Title	Mandate start	Mandate end	Term length
Hawa Sisay-Sabally		Gambia	Minister for Justice	April 1996	31 July 1998	2 years, 121 days
Fatou Bensouda	Portrait of Fatou Bensouda	Gambia	Minister for Justice	31 July 1998	March 2000	1 year, 214 days
Januaria Moreira		Cape Verde	Minister of Justice and Labor	1999	2001	2 years, 0 days
Antonieta Rosa Gomes		Guinea-Bissau	Minister of Justice	19 February 2000	19 March 2001	1 year, 28 days
Cristina Fontes Lima		Cape Verde	Minister of Justice and Labor	2001	2006	5 years, 0 days
Alda Alves de Melo dos Santos		São Tomé and Príncipe	Minister of Justice, Public Administration and Human Rights	2002	2002	364 days
Hyacinthe Wodobodé		Central African Republic	Minister of Justice and Human Rights	12 December 2003	2 September 2004	265 days
Brigitte Mabandla		South Africa	Minister of Justice and Constitutional Development	29 April 2004	25 September 2008	1 year, 149 days
Martha Karua	Portrait of Martha Karua	Kenya	Minister of Justice	2005	6 April 2009	4 years, 95 days
Mary Nagu	Portrait of Mary Nagu	Tanzania	Minister of Justice and Constitutional Affairs	2006	2008	2 years, 0 days
Carmelita Pires		Guinea-Bissau	Minister of Justice	13 April 2007	2 January 2009	1 year, 264 days
Carmelita Pires		Guinea-Bissau	Minister of Justice	3 July 2014	13 October 2017	3 years, 102 days
Marie Saine-Firdaus		Gambia	Minister for Justice	14 September 2007	19 March 2010	2 years, 186 days
Marisa Helena Morias		Cape Verde	Minister of Justice and Labor	2008	2011	3 years, 0 days
Betty Mould-Iddrisu		Ghana	Attorney General	7 January 2009	3 January 2011	1 year, 361 days
Edite Tenjua		São Tomé and Príncipe	Minister of Justice, Public Administration and Human Rights	2012	2014	2 years, 0 days
Marietta Brew Appiah-Oppong	Portrait of Marietta Brew Appiah-Oppong	Ghana	Attorney General	14 February 2013	7 January 2017	3 years, 328 days
Amie Joof		Gambia	Minister for Justice	25 May 2013	27 August 2013	94 days
Mama Fatima Singhateh	Portrait of Mama Fatima Singhateh	Gambia	Minister for Justice	27 August 2013	27 August 2014	1 year, 0 days
Mama Fatima Singhateh	Portrait of Mama Fatima Singhateh	Gambia	Minister for Justice	12 January 2015	17 January 2017	2 years, 5 days
Ilza Amado Vaz	Portrait of Ilza Amado Vaz	São Tomé and Príncipe	Minister of Justice, Public Administration and Human Rights	2014	2018	4 years, 0 days
Asha-Rose Migiro	Portrait of Asha-Rose Migiro	Tanzania	Minister of Justice and Constitutional Affairs	20 January 2014	5 November 2015	1 year, 289 days
Janine Lélis	Portrait of Janine Lélis	Cape Verde	Minister of Justice and Labor	22 May 2016	20 May 2021	4 years, 363 days
Gloria Akuffo		Ghana	Attorney General	21 January 2017	6 January 2021	3 years, 351 days
Aimée Zebeyoux		Ivory Coast	Minister of Justice and Human Rights	2018	2021	3 years
Priscilla Schwartz		Sierra Leone	Attorney General and Minister of Justice	11 June 2018	7 July 2020	2 years, 26 days
Jeanine Nibizi		Burundi	Minister of Justice	28 June 2020	7 September 2022	2 years, 72 days
Leïla Jaffel		Tunisia	Minister of Justice	11 October 2021	Incumbent	4 years, 352 days

== Asian ministers ==
The following list includes all women who have served as national justice ministers or analogous governmental officials in Asia. Politicians are listed based on the starting dates of their tenures.

denotes an incumbent justice minister or equivalent officeholder

Name	Image	Country	Title	Mandate start	Mandate end	Term length
Ho Jong-suk	Portrait of Ho Jong-suk	North Korea	Minister of Justice	1957	1957	2 months
Ritsuko Nagao		Japan	Minister of Justice	11 January 1996	7 November 1996	301 days
Yeh Chin-fong		Taiwan	Minister of Justice	1 February 1999	20 May 2000	1 year, 109 days
Mayumi Moriyama	Portrait of Mayumi Moriyama	Japan	Minister of Justice	16 April 2001	19 November 2003	2 years, 217 days
Ana Pessoa Pinto	Portrait of Ana Pessoa Pinto	East Timor	Minister of Justice	20 May 2002	2003	226 days
Merceditas Gutierrez		Philippines	Secretary of Justice	27 November 2002	15 January 2003	49 days
Merceditas Gutierrez		Philippines	Secretary of Justice	24 December 2003	31 August 2004	251 days
Kang Kum-sil	Portrait of Kang Kum-sil	South Korea	Minister of Justice	27 February 2003	29 July 2004	1 year, 153 days
Chieko Nōno	Portrait of Chieko Nōno	Japan	Minister of Justice	22 September 2004	31 October 2005	1 year, 39 days
Wu Aiying	Portrait of Wu Aiying	China	Minister of Justice	1 July 2005	24 February 2017	11 years, 238 days
Tzipi Livni	Portrait of Tzipi Livni	Israel	Minister of Justice	29 November 2006	7 February 2007	70 days
Tzipi Livni	Portrait of Tzipi Livni	Israel	Minister of Justice	18 March 2013	4 December 2014	1 year, 261 days
Lucia Freitas Lobato		East Timor	Minister of Justice	8 May 2007	8 August 2012	5 years, 92 days
Agnes Devanadera	Portrait of Agnes Devanadera	Philippines	Secretary of Justice	3 September 2007	15 November 2007	73 days
Agnes Devanadera	Portrait of Agnes Devanadera	Philippines	Secretary of Justice	12 January 2010	8 March 2010	55 days
Wang Ching-feng	Portrait of Wang Ching-feng	Taiwan	Minister of Justice	20 May 2008	12 March 2010	1 year, 296 days
Keiko Chiba	Portrait of Keiko Chiba	Japan	Minister of Justice	16 September 2009	17 September 2010	1 year, 1 day
Leila de Lima	Portrait of Leila de Lima	Philippines	Secretary of Justice	30 June 2010	12 October 2015	5 years, 104 days
Luo Ying-shay	Portrait of Luo Ying-shay	Taiwan	Minister of Justice	30 September 2013	20 May 2016	2 years, 233 days
Midori Matsushima	Portrait of Midori Matsushima	Japan	Minister of Justice	3 September 2014	20 October 2014	47 days
Yōko Kamikawa	Portrait of Yōko Kamikawa	Japan	Minister of Justice	20 October 2014	7 October 2015	352 days
Yōko Kamikawa	Portrait of Yōko Kamikawa	Japan	Minister of Justice	3 August 2017	2 October 2018	1 year, 60 days
Yōko Kamikawa	Portrait of Yōko Kamikawa	Japan	Minister of Justice	16 September 2020	4 October 2021	1 year, 18 days
Ayelet Shaked	Portrait of Ayelet Shaked	Israel	Minister of Justice	14 May 2015	2 June 2019	4 years, 19 days
Thalatha Atukorale	Portrait of Thalatha Atukorale	Sri Lanka	Minister of Justice	25 August 2017	4 August 2020	2 years, 345 days
Masako Mori	Portrait of Masako Mori	Japan	Minister of Justice	31 October 2019	16 September 2020	321 days
Choo Mi-ae	Portrait of Choo Mi-ae	South Korea	Minister of Justice	2 January 2020	27 January 2021	1 year, 25 days
Marie-Claude Najm		Lebanon	Minister of Justice	21 January 2020	10 September 2021	1 year, 232 days
Shiva Maya Tumbahamphe		Nepal	Minister of Law, Justice and Parliamentary Affairs	17 February 2020	25 December 2020	312 days
He Rong	Portrait of He Rong	China	Minister of Justice	24 February 2023	Incumbent	3 years, 216 days
Harini Amarasuriya		Sri Lanka	Minister of Justice	24 September 2024	18 November 2024	55 days
Sobita Gautam		Nepal	Minister of Law, Justice and Parliamentary Affairs	27 March 2026	Incumbent	185 days

== European ministers ==
The following list includes all women who have served as national justice ministers or analogous governmental officials in Europe. Politicians are listed based on the starting dates of their tenures.

denotes an incumbent justice minister or equivalent officeholder

Name	Image	Country	Title	Mandate start	Mandate end	Term length
Hilde Benjamin	Portrait of Hilde Benjamin	East Germany	Minister of Justice	15 July 1953	2 July 1967	13 years, 352 days
Stella Soulioti		Cyprus	Minister of Justice and Public Order	1960	1970	10 years, 0 days
Elisabeth Schweigaard Selmer	Portrait of Elisabeth Schweigaard Selmer	Norway	Minister of Justice and the Police (Note: From 2012 onwards, this position has been known as Minister of Justice and Public Security.)	12 October 1965	3 October 1970	4 years, 356 days
Svetla Daskalova		Bulgaria	Minister of Justice	12 March 1966	8 February 1990	23 years, 333 days
Auður Auðuns		Iceland	Minister of the Interior	10 October 1970	14 July 1971	277 days
Inger Louise Valle		Norway	Minister of Justice and the Police	16 October 1973	8 October 1979	5 years, 355 days
Nathalie Lind		Denmark	Minister of Justice	19 December 1973	13 February 1975	1 year, 56 days
Nathalie Lind		Denmark	Minister of Justice	30 August 1978	26 October 1979	1 year, 57 days
Inkeri Anttila	Portrait of Inkeri Anttila	Finland	Minister of Justice	13 June 1975	30 November 1975	170 days
Colette Flesch	Portrait of Colette Flesch	Luxembourg	Minister of Justice	22 November 1980	20 July 1984	3 years, 241 days
Mona Røkke		Norway	Minister of Justice and the Police	14 October 1981	3 October 1985	3 years, 354 days
Elisabeth Kopp	Portrait of Elisabeth Kopp	Switzerland	Head of the Federal Department of Justice and Police	2 October 1984	12 January 1988	4 years, 102 days
Wenche Frogn Sellæg	Portrait of Wenche Frogn Sellæg	Norway	Minister of Justice and the Police	4 October 1985	9 May 1986	217 days
Helen Bøsterud	Portrait of Wenche Frogn Sellæg	Norway	Minister of Justice and the Police	9 May 1986	16 October 1989	3 years, 160 days
Anna-Greta Leijon	Portrait of Anna-Greta Leijon	Sweden	Minister for Justice	19 October 1987	7 June 1988	232 days
Laila Freivalds	Portrait of Laila Freivalds	Sweden	Minister for Justice	4 October 1988	4 October 1991	3 years, 0 days
Laila Freivalds	Portrait of Laila Freivalds	Sweden	Minister for Justice	7 October 1994	21 September 2000	5 years, 350 days
Else Bugge Fougner		Norway	Minister of Justice and the Police	16 October 1989	3 November 1990	1 year, 18 days
Tarja Halonen	Portrait of Tarja Halonen	Finland	Minister of Justice	1 March 1990	26 April 1991	1 year, 56 days
Kari Gjesteby		Norway	Minister of Justice and the Police	3 November 1990	3 September 1992	1 year, 305 days
Hannele Pokka	Portrait of Hannele Pokka	Finland	Minister of Justice	26 April 1991	30 April 1994	3 years, 4 days
Gun Hellsvik		Sweden	Minister for Justice	4 October 1991	7 October 1994	3 years, 3 days
Sabine Leutheusser-Schnarrenberger	Portrait of Sabine Leutheusser-Schnarrenberger	Germany	Federal Minister of Justice	18 May 1992	17 January 1996	3 years, 244 days
Sabine Leutheusser-Schnarrenberger	Portrait of Sabine Leutheusser-Schnarrenberger	Germany	Federal Minister of Justice	28 October 2009	17 December 2013	4 years, 50 days
Grete Faremo	Portrait of Grete Faremo	Norway	Minister of Justice and the Police	4 September 1992	25 October 1996	4 years, 51 days
Grete Faremo	Portrait of Grete Faremo	Norway	Minister of Justice and the Police	11 November 2011	16 October 2013	1 year, 339 days
Anna Benaki-Psarouda		Greece	Minister of Justice, Transparency and Human Rights	3 December 1992	13 September 1993	284 days
Máire Geoghegan-Quinn	Portrait of Máire Geoghegan-Quinn	Ireland	Minister for Justice	4 January 1993	15 December 1994	1 year, 345 days
Pia Gjellerup		Denmark	Minister of Justice	25 January 1993	29 March 1993	63 days
Anneli Jäätteenmäki	Portrait of Anneli Jäätteenmäki	Finland	Minister of Justice	1 May 1994	13 April 1995	347 days
Winnie Sorgdrager	Portrait of Winnie Sorgdrager	Netherlands	Minister of Justice and Security	22 August 1994	3 August 1998	3 years, 346 days
Nora Owen		Ireland	Minister for Justice	15 December 1994	26 June 1997	2 years, 193 days
Margarita Mariscal de Gante	Portrait of Margarita Mariscal de Gante	Spain	Minister of Justice	6 May 1996	28 April 2000	3 years, 358 days
Anne Holt	Portrait of Anne Holt	Norway	Minister of Justice and the Police	25 October 1996	4 February 1997	102 days
Vlasta Parkanová	Portrait of Vlasta Parkanová	Czech Republic	Minister of Justice	7 January 1997	22 July 1998	1 year, 196 days
Gerd-Liv Valla	Portrait of Gerd-Liv Valla	Norway	Minister of Justice and the Police	4 February 1997	17 October 1997	255 days
Élisabeth Guigou	Portrait of Élisabeth Guigou	France	Minister of Justice	4 June 1997	18 October 2000	3 years, 136 days
Suzanna Stanik		Ukraine	Minister of Justice	21 August 1997	7 May 2002	4 years, 259 days
Aud Inger Aure		Norway	Minister of Justice and the Police	17 October 1997	15 March 1999	1 year, 149 days
Hanna Suchocka	Portrait of Hanna Suchocka	Poland	Minister of Justice	31 October 1997	8 June 2000	2 years, 280 days
Herta Däubler-Gmelin	Portrait of Herta Däubler-Gmelin	Germany	Federal Minister of Justice	27 October 1998	22 October 2002	3 years, 360 days
Ingrīda Labucka		Latvia	Minister of Justice	26 November 1998	16 July 1999	232 days
Ingrīda Labucka		Latvia	Minister of Justice	5 May 2000	7 November 2002	2 years, 186 days
Sólveig Pétursdóttir	Portrait of Sólveig Pétursdóttir	Iceland	Minister of the Interior	28 May 1999	23 May 2003	3 years, 360 days
Valeria Șterbeț		Moldova	Minister of Justice	21 December 1999	19 April 2001	1 year, 119 days
Hanne Harlem		Norway	Minister of Justice and the Police	17 March 2000	19 October 2001	1 year, 216 days
Marylise Lebranchu	Portrait of Marylise Lebranchu	France	Minister of Justice	18 October 2000	6 May 2002	1 year, 200 days
Rodica Stănoiu		Romania	Minister of Justice	28 December 2000	10 March 2004	3 years, 73 days
Ingrid Antičević-Marinović	Portrait of Ingrid Antičević-Marinović	Croatia	Minister of Justice	28 September 2001	23 December 2003	2 years, 86 days
Barbara Piwnik	Portrait of Barbara Piwnik	Poland	Minister of Justice	19 October 2001	6 July 2002	260 days
Lene Espersen	Portrait of Lene Espersen	Denmark	Minister of Justice	27 November 2001	10 September 2008	6 years, 288 days
Celeste Cardona		Portugal	Minister of Justice	6 April 2002	17 July 2004	3 years, 102 days
Brigitte Zypries	Portrait of Brigitte Zypries	Germany	Federal Minister of Justice	22 October 2002	27 October 2009	7 years, 5 days
Karin Gastinger		Austria	Minister of Justice	28 February 2003	11 January 2007	3 years, 317 days
Laurette Onkelinx	Portrait of Laurette Onkelinx	Belgium	Minister of Justice	11 July 2003	21 December 2007	4 years, 163 days
Vesna Škare-Ožbolt	Portrait of Vesna Škare-Ožbolt	Croatia	Minister of Justice	23 December 2003	10 February 2006	2 years, 49 days
Vineta Muižniece	Portrait of Vineta Muižniece	Latvia	Minister of Justice	9 March 2004	2 December 2004	268 days
Monica Macovei	Portrait of Monica Macovei	Romania	Minister of Justice	29 December 2004	5 April 2007	2 years, 97 days
Victoria Iftodi		Moldova	Minister of Justice	8 July 2004	20 September 2006	2 years, 74 days
Victoria Iftodi		Moldova	Minister of Justice	19 March 2018	8 June 2019	1 year, 81 days
Solvita Āboltiņa	Portrait of Solvita Āboltiņa	Latvia	Minister of Justice	2 December 2004	7 November 2006	1 year, 340 days
Leena Luhtanen	Portrait of Leena Luhtanen	Finland	Minister of Justice	23 September 2005	19 April 2007	1 year, 208 days
Lucia Žitňanská	Portrait of Lucia Žitňanská	Slovakia	Minister of Justice	8 February 2006	4 July 2006	55 days
Lucia Žitňanská	Portrait of Lucia Žitňanská	Slovakia	Minister of Justice	8 July 2010	4 April 2012	1 year, 271 days
Lucia Žitňanská	Portrait of Lucia Žitňanská	Slovakia	Minister of Justice	23 March 2016	22 March 2018	1 year, 364 days
Ana Lovrin		Croatia	Minister of Justice	10 February 2006	10 October 2008	2 years, 243 days
Beatrice Ask	Portrait of Beatrice Ask	Sweden	Minister for Justice	6 October 2006	3 October 2014	7 years, 362 days
Maria Berger	Portrait of Maria Berger	Austria	Minister of Justice	11 January 2007	2 December 2008	1 year, 326 days
Tuija Brax	Portrait of Tuija Brax	Finland	Minister of Justice	19 April 2007	22 June 2011	4 years, 64 days
Rachida Dati	Portrait of Rachida Dati	France	Minister of Justice	18 May 2007	23 June 2009	2 years, 36 days
Miglena Tacheva		Bulgaria	Minister of Justice	19 July 2007	27 July 2009	2 years, 8 days
Eveline Widmer-Schlumpf	Portrait of Eveline Widmer-Schlumpf	Switzerland	Head of the Federal Department of Justice and Police	1 January 2008	31 December 2010	2 years, 364 days
Snežana Malović	Portrait of Snežana Malović	Serbia	Minister of Justice	7 July 2008	27 July 2012	4 years, 20 days
Claudia Bandion-Ortner	Portrait of Claudia Bandion-Ortner	Austria	Minister of Justice	15 January 2009	21 April 2011	2 years, 96 days
Ragna Árnadóttir	Portrait of Ragna Árnadóttir	Iceland	Minister of the Interior	1 February 2009	2 September 2010	1 year, 213 days
Aurelia Frick	Portrait of Aurelia Frick	Liechtenstein	Minister of Foreign Affairs, Justice and Culture	25 March 2009	2 July 2019	10 years, 99 days
Daniela Kovářová	Portrait of Daniela Kovářová	Czech Republic	Minister of Justice	8 May 2009	13 July 2010	1 year, 66 days
Michèle Alliot-Marie	Portrait of Michèle Alliot-Marie	France	Minister of Justice	23 June 2009	13 November 2010	1 year, 143 days
Margarita Popova	Portrait of Margarita Popova	Bulgaria	Minister of Justice	27 July 2009	29 November 2011	2 years, 125 days
Simonetta Sommaruga	Portrait of Simonetta Sommaruga	Switzerland	Head of the Federal Department of Justice and Police	1 January 2010	31 December 2018	8 years, 364 days
Beatrix Karl	Portrait of Beatrix Karl	Austria	Minister of Justice	21 April 2011	16 December 2013	2 years, 239 days
Paula Teixeira da Cruz	Portrait of Paula Teixeira da Cruz	Portugal	Minister of Justice	21 June 2011	30 October 2015	4 years, 131 days
Anna-Maja Henriksson	Portrait of Anna-Maja Henriksson	Finland	Minister of Justice	22 June 2011	29 May 2015	3 years, 341 days
Anna-Maja Henriksson	Portrait of Anna-Maja Henriksson	Finland	Minister of Justice	6 June 2019	20 June 2023	4 years, 14 days
Paola Severino	Portrait of Paola Severino	Italy	Minister of Justice	16 November 2011	28 April 2013	1 year, 163 days
Diana Kovatcheva		Bulgaria	Minister of Justice	30 November 2011	21 February 2013	1 year, 83 days
Annemie Turtelboom	Portrait of Annemie Turtelboom	Belgium	Minister of Justice	6 December 2011	25 July 2014	2 years, 231 days
Christiane Taubira	Portrait of Christiane Taubira	France	Minister of Justice	16 May 2012	27 January 2016	3 years, 256 days
Mona Pivniceru		Romania	Minister of Justice	23 August 2012	28 March 2013	217 days
Tea Tsulukiani	Portrait of Tea Tsulukiani	Georgia	Minister of Justice	25 October 2012	1 October 2020	7 years, 342 days
Anna Maria Cancellieri	Portrait of Anna Maria Cancellieri	Italy	Minister of Justice	28 April 2013	22 February 2014	300 days
Octavie Modert	Portrait of Octavie Modert	Luxembourg	Minister of Justice	30 April 2013	4 December 2013	218 days
Olena Lukash	Portrait of Olena Lukash	Ukraine	Minister of Justice	4 July 2013	27 February 2014	238 days
Marie Benešová		Czech Republic	Minister of Justice	10 July 2013	29 January 2014	203 days
Karen Hækkerup	Portrait of Karen Hækkerup	Denmark	Minister of Justice	12 December 2013	10 October 2014	302 days
Baiba Broka	Portrait of Baiba Broka	Latvia	Minister of Justice	22 January 2014	6 August 2014	196 days
Helena Válková		Czech Republic	Minister of Justice	29 January 2014	1 March 2015	1 year, 31 days
Frances Fitzgerald	Portrait of Frances Fitzgerald	Ireland	Minister for Justice	8 May 2014	14 June 2017	3 years, 37 days
Maggie De Block	Portrait of Maggie De Block	Belgium	Minister of Justice	25 July 2014	11 October 2014	78 days
Mette Frederiksen	Portrait of Mette Frederiksen	Denmark	Minister of Justice	10 October 2014	28 June 2015	261 days
Ekaterina Zakharieva	Portrait of Ekaterina Zakharieva	Bulgaria	Minister of Justice	3 January 2015	27 January 2017	2 years, 24 days
Arpine Hovhannisyan	Portrait of Arpine Hovhannisyan	Armenia	Minister of Justice	4 September 2015	11 May 2017	1 year, 249 days
Raluca Prună		Romania	Minister of Justice	17 November 2015	4 January 2017	1 year, 48 days
Francisca Van Dunem	Portrait of Francisca Van Dunem	Portugal	Minister of Justice	26 November 2015	30 March 2022	6 years, 124 days
Liz Truss	Portrait of Liz Truss	United Kingdom	Secretary of State for Justice	14 July 2016	11 June 2017	332 days
Nela Kuburović	Portrait of Nela Kuburović	Serbia	Minister of Justice	11 August 2016	28 October 2020	4 years, 78 days
Milda Vainiutė	Portrait of Milda Vainiutė	Lithuania	Minister of Justice	13 December 2016	6 March 2018	1 year, 83 days
Sigríður Á. Andersen	Portrait of Sigríður Á. Andersen	Iceland	Minister of the Interior	11 January 2017	14 March 2019	2 years, 62 days
Mariya Pavlova		Bulgaria	Minister of Justice	27 January 2017	4 May 2017	97 days
Mariya Pavlova		Bulgaria	Minister of Justice	9 April 2024	16 January 2025	282 days
Tsetska Tsacheva	Portrait of Tsetska Tsacheva	Bulgaria	Minister of Justice	4 May 2017	5 April 2019	1 year, 336 days
Nicole Belloubet	Portrait of Nicole Belloubet	France	Minister of Justice	21 June 2017	6 July 2020	3 years, 15 days
Etilda Gjonaj	Portrait of Etilda Gjonaj	Albania	Minister of Justice	11 September 2017	18 September 2021	4 years, 7 days
Sylvi Listhaug	Portrait of Sylvi Listhaug	Norway	Minister of Justice and Public Security	17 January 2018	20 March 2018	62 days
Katarina Barley	Portrait of Katarina Barley	Germany	Federal Minister of Justice	14 March 2018	27 June 2019	1 year, 105 days
Dolores Delgado	Portrait of Dolores Delgado	Spain	Minister of Justice	7 June 2018	13 January 2020	1 year, 220 days
Taťána Malá		Czech Republic	Minister of Justice	28 June 2018	10 July 2018	12 days
Andreja Katič	Portrait of Andreja Katič	Slovenia	Minister of Justice	13 September 2018	13 March 2020	1 year, 182 days
Andreja Katič	Portrait of Andreja Katič	Slovenia	Minister of Justice	5 March 2024	Incumbent	2 years, 207 days
Karin Keller-Sutter	Portrait of Karin Keller-Sutter	Switzerland	Head of the Federal Department of Justice and Police	1 January 2019	31 December 2022	3 years, 364 days
Olesea Stamate		Moldova	Minister of Justice	24 June 2019	14 November 2019	143 days
Christine Lambrecht	Portrait of Christine Lambrecht	Germany	Federal Minister of Justice	27 June 2019	8 December 2021	2 years, 164 days
Judit Varga	Portrait of Judit Varga	Hungary	Minister of Justice	12 July 2019	31 July 2023	4 years, 19 days
Áslaug Arna Sigurbjörnsdóttir		Iceland	Minister of the Interior	6 September 2019	28 November 2021	2 years, 83 days
Alma Zadić	Portrait of Alma Zadić	Austria	Minister of Justice	7 January 2020	3 March 2025	5 years, 55 days
Monica Mæland	Portrait of Monica Mæland	Norway	Minister of Justice and Public Security	24 January 2020	14 October 2021	1 year, 263 days
Albulena Haxhiu	Portrait of Albulena Haxhiu	Kosovo	Minister of Justice	3 February 2020	3 June 2020	121 days
Albulena Haxhiu	Portrait of Albulena Haxhiu	Kosovo	Minister of Justice	22 March 2021	26 August 2025	4 years, 157 days
Lilijana Kozlovič		Slovenia	Minister of Justice	13 March 2020	27 May 2021	1 year, 75 days
Mária Kolíková		Slovakia	Minister of Justice	21 March 2020	13 September 2022	2 years, 176 days
Helen McEntee	Portrait of Helen McEntee	Ireland	Minister for Justice	27 June 2020	27 April 2021	304 days
Helen McEntee	Portrait of Helen McEntee	Ireland	Minister for Justice	1 November 2021	25 November 2022	1 year, 24 days
Helen McEntee	Portrait of Helen McEntee	Ireland	Minister for Justice	1 June 2023	23 January 2025	1 year, 236 days
Emily Yiolitis		Cyprus	Minister of Justice and Public Order	29 June 2020	17 June 2021	353 days
Maja Popović	Portrait of Maja Popović	Serbia	Minister of Justice	28 October 2020	16 April 2025	4 years, 170 days
Ewelina Dobrowolska	Portrait of Ewelina Dobrowolska	Lithuania	Minister of Justice	7 December 2020	12 December 2024	4 years, 5 days
Maris Lauri	Portrait of Maris Lauri	Estonia	Minister of Justice	26 January 2021	18 July 2022	1 year, 173 days
Marta Cartabia	Portrait of Marta Cartabia	Italy	Minister of Justice	13 February 2021	22 October 2022	1 year, 251 days
Graziella Marok-Wachter		Liechtenstein	Minister of Foreign Affairs, Justice and Culture	25 March 2021	10 April 2025	4 years, 16 days
Heather Humphreys	Portrait of Heather Humphreys	Ireland	Minister for Justice	27 April 2021	1 November 2021	188 days
Heather Humphreys	Portrait of Heather Humphreys	Ireland	Minister for Justice	26 November 2022	17 December 2022	21 days
Stefi Drakou		Cyprus	Minister of Justice and Public Order	2 July 2021	28 February 2023	1 year, 241 days
Pilar Llop	Portrait of Pilar Llop	Spain	Minister of Justice	12 July 2021	21 November 2023	2 years, 132 days
Emilie Mehl	Portrait of Emilie Mehl	Norway	Minister of Justice and Public Security	14 October 2021	4 February 2025	3 years, 113 days
Dilan Yeşilgöz	Portrait of Dilan Yeşilgöz	Netherlands	Minister of Justice and Security	10 January 2022	1 July 2024	2 years, 173 days
Catarina Sarmento e Castro	Portrait of Catarina Sarmento e Castro	Portugal	Minister of Justice	30 March 2022	2 April 2024	−2 years, 3 days
Dominika Švarc Pipan	Portrait of Dominika Švarc Pipan	Slovenia	Minister of Justice	1 June 2022	16 February 2024	1 year, 260 days
Lea Danilson-Järg	Portrait of Lea Danilson-Järg	Estonia	Minister of Justice	18 July 2022	17 April 2023	273 days
Inese Lībiņa-Egnere	Portrait of Inese Lībiņa-Egnere	Latvia	Minister of Justice	14 December 2022	28 May 2026	3 years, 165 days
Élisabeth Baume-Schneider	Portrait of Élisabeth Baume-Schneider	Switzerland	Head of the Federal Department of Justice and Police	1 January 2023	31 December 2023	364 days
Veronica Mihailov-Moraru		Moldova	Minister of Justice	16 February 2023	1 November 2025	2 years, 258 days
Anna Koukkides-Procopiou		Cyprus	Minister of Justice and Public Order	1 March 2023	10 January 2024	315 days
Ester Molné Soldevila		Andorra	Minister of Social Affairs, Justice and Interior	17 May 2023	Incumbent	3 years, 134 days
Alina Gorghiu	Portrait of Alina Gorghiu	Romania	Minister of Justice	15 June 2023	23 December 2024	1 year, 181 days
Guðrún Hafsteinsdóttir		Iceland	Minister of the Interior	19 June 2023	21 December 2024	1 year, 185 days
Leena Meri	Portrait of Leena Meri	Finland	Minister of Justice	20 June 2023	Incumbent	3 years, 100 days
Elisabeth Margue	Portrait of Elisabeth Margue	Luxembourg	Minister of Justice	17 November 2023	Incumbent	2 years, 315 days
Rita Júdice		Portugal	Minister of Justice	2 April 2024	Incumbent	2 years, 179 days
Astri Aas-Hansen		Norway	Minister of Justice and Public Security	4 February 2025	Incumbent	1 year, 236 days
Shabana Mahmood	Portrait of Shabana Mahmood	United Kingdom	Secretary of State for Justice	5 July 2024	5 September 2025	1 year, 62 days
Liisa Pakosta	Portrait of Liisa Pakosta	Estonia	Minister of Justice	23 July 2024	Incumbent	2 years, 67 days
Þorbjörg Sigríður Gunnlaugsdóttir	Portrait of Þorbjörg Sigríður Gunnlaugsdóttir	Iceland	Minister of the Interior	21 December 2024	Incumbent	1 year, 281 days
Annelies Verlinden	Portrait of Annelies Verlinden	Belgium	Minister of Justice	3 February 2025	Incumbent	1 year, 237 days
Anna Sporrer		Austria	Minister of Justice	3 March 2025	Incumbent	1 year, 209 days
Stefanie Hubig		Germany	Federal Minister of Justice and Consumer Protection	6 May 2025	Incumbent	1 year, 145 days
Eva Decroix		Czech Republic	Minister of Justice	10 June 2025	15 December 2025	188 days
Rita Tamašunienė		Lithuania	Minister of Justice	25 September 2025	Incumbent	1 year, 3 days
Márta Görög		Hungary	Minister of Justice	13 May 2026	Incumbent	138 days

== North American ministers ==
The following list includes all women who have served as national justice ministers or analogous governmental officials in North America. Politicians are listed based on the starting dates of their tenures.

denotes an incumbent justice minister or equivalent officeholder

Name	Image	Country	Title	Mandate start	Mandate end	Term length
Yolanda Myers de Vásquez		El Salvador	Attorney General	1967	1972	5 years, 0 days
Elizabeth Odio Benito	Portrait of Elizabeth Odio Benito	Costa Rica	Minister of Justice and Peace	8 May 1978	8 May 1982	4 years, 0 days
Elizabeth Odio Benito	Portrait of Elizabeth Odio Benito	Costa Rica	Minister of Justice and Peace	8 May 1990	8 May 1994	4 years, 0 days
Dina Castro de Callejas		El Salvador	Attorney General	1982	1984	2 years, 0 days
Pura Luz Núñez Pérez		Dominican Republic	Attorney General	1986	1987	1 year, 0 days
Semiramis Olivo de Pichardo		Dominican Republic	Attorney General	1988	1990	2 years, 0 days
Rhina de Rey Prendes		El Salvador	Attorney General	1989	1990	1 year, 0 days
Maruja Chacón Pacheco		Costa Rica	Minister of Justice and Peace	8 May 1989	8 May 1990	1 year, 0 days
Kim Campbell	Portrait of Kim Campbell	Canada	Minister of Justice and Attorney General	23 February 1990	3 January 1993	2 years, 315 days
Celin Discua		Honduras	Minister of Human Rights, Justice, Governance and Decentralization	1993	1994	1 year, 0 days
Janet Reno	Portrait of Janet Reno	United States	Attorney General	11 March 1993	20 January 2001	7 years, 315 days
Janet Bostwick		Bahamas	Attorney General and Minister of Legal Affairs	1995	1997	2 years, 0 days
Maureen Clarke		Costa Rica	Minister of Justice and Peace	19 June 1995	3 July 1996	1 year, 14 days
Anne McLellan	Portrait of Anne McLellan	Canada	Minister of Justice and Attorney General	11 June 1997	14 January 2002	4 years, 217 days
Mónica Nágel Berger		Costa Rica	Minister of Justice and Peace	8 May 1998	8 May 2002	4 years, 0 days
Mia Mottley	Portrait of Mia Mottley	Barbados	Attorney General	2001	2003	2 years, 0 days
Vera Sofía Rubi		Honduras	Minister of Human Rights, Justice, Governance and Decentralization	2001	27 January 2002	1 year, 26 days
Patricia Vega		Costa Rica	Minister of Justice and Peace	25 November 2002	8 May 2006	3 years, 164 days
Allyson Maynard Gibson	Portrait of Allyson Maynard Gibson	Bahamas	Attorney General and Minister of Legal Affairs	2006	2007	1 year, 0 days
Allyson Maynard Gibson	Portrait of Allyson Maynard Gibson	Bahamas	Attorney General and Minister of Legal Affairs	10 May 2012	24 May 2017	5 years, 14 days
Laura Chinchilla	Portrait of Laura Chinchilla	Costa Rica	Minister of Justice and Peace	8 May 2006	8 October 2008	2 years, 153 days
Claire Hepburn		Bahamas	Attorney General and Minister of Legal Affairs	2007	2008	1 year, 0 days
Dorothy Lightbourne		Jamaica	Minister of Justice	11 September 2007	23 October 2011	4 years, 42 days
Viviana Martín Salazar		Costa Rica	Minister of Justice and Peace	8 October 2008	28 July 2009	293 days
Claudia Paz y Paz	Portrait of Claudia Paz y Paz	Guatemala	Attorney General	9 December 2010	17 May 2014	3 years, 159 days
Marisela Morales	Portrait of Marisela Morales	Mexico	Attorney General	1 April 2011	30 November 2011	243 days
Ana Pineda		Honduras	Minister of Human Rights, Justice, Governance and Decentralization	2012	27 January 2014	2 years, 26 days
Ana Isabel Garita Vílchez		Costa Rica	Minister of Justice and Peace	27 June 2013	8 May 2014	315 days
Cristina Ramírez Chavarría		Costa Rica	Minister of Justice and Peace	8 May 2014	7 July 2015	1 year, 60 days
Thelma Aldana	Portrait of Thelma Aldana	Guatemala	Attorney General	17 May 2014	16 May 2018	3 years, 364 days
Loretta Lynch	Portrait of Loretta Lynch	United States	Attorney General	27 April 2015	20 January 2017	1 year, 268 days
Cecilia Sánchez Romero		Costa Rica	Minister of Justice and Peace	7 July 2015	1 January 2018	2 years, 178 days
Jody Wilson-Raybould	Portrait of Jody Wilson-Raybould	Canada	Minister of Justice and Attorney General	4 November 2015	12 February 2019	3 years, 100 days
Marlene Malahoo Forte	Portrait of Marlene Malahoo Forte	Jamaica	Minister of Justice	7 March 2016	10 January 2022	5 years, 309 days
Karla Cuevas		Honduras	Minister of Human Rights, Justice, Governance and Decentralization	16 January 2018	22 January 2021	3 years, 6 days
Marcia González Aguiluz		Costa Rica	Minister of Justice and Peace	8 May 2018	7 February 2020	1 year, 275 days
María Consuelo Porras	Portrait of María Consuelo Porras	Guatemala	Attorney General	17 May 2018	16 May 2026	7 years, 364 days
Fiorella Salazar Rojas	Portrait of Fiorella Salazar Rojas	Costa Rica	Minister of Justice and Peace	14 February 2020	Incumbent	6 years, 226 days
Dia Forrester		Grenada	Attorney General	1 January 2021	1 July 2022	1 year, 181 days
Claudette Joseph		Grenada	Attorney General	1 July 2022	Incumbent	4 years, 89 days
Pam Bondi		United States	Attorney General	5 February 2025	2 April 2026	1 year, 56 days

== Oceanian ministers ==
The following list includes all women who have served as national justice ministers or analogous governmental officials in Oceania. Politicians are listed based on the starting dates of their tenures.

denotes an incumbent justice minister or equivalent officeholder

Name	Image	Country	Title	Mandate start	Mandate end	Term length
Hilda Lini		Vanuatu	Minister of Justice	October 1996	November 1996	1 year, 31 days
Amanda Vanstone	Portrait of Amanda Vanstone	Australia	Attorney General of Australia	9 October 1997	30 January 2001	3 years, 113 days
Isabelle Donald		Vanuatu	Minister of Justice	2006	2007	1 year, 0 days
Annette King	Portrait of Annette King	New Zealand	Minister of Justice	31 October 2007	19 November 2008	1 year, 19 days
Fiamē Naomi Mataʻafa	Portrait of Fiamē Naomi Mataʻafa	Samoa	Minister of Justice and Courts Administration	18 March 2011	19 March 2016	5 years, 1 day
Judith Collins	Portrait of Judith Collins	New Zealand	Minister of Justice	12 December 2011	30 August 2014	2 years, 261 days
Nicola Roxon	Portrait of Nicola Roxon	Australia	Attorney General of Australia	14 December 2011	2 February 2013	1 year, 50 days
Amy Adams	Portrait of Amy Adams	New Zealand	Minister of Justice	30 August 2014	26 October 2017	3 years, 57 days
Michaelia Cash	Portrait of Michaelia Cash	Australia	Attorney General of Australia	30 March 2021	23 May 2022	1 year, 54 days
Kiri Allan	Portrait of Kiri Allan	New Zealand	Minister of Justice	14 June 2022	24 July 2023	1 year, 40 days
Ginny Andersen	Portrait of Ginny Andersen	New Zealand	Minister of Justice	24 July 2023	27 November 2023	126 days
Michelle Rowland	Portrait of Michelle Rowland	Australia	Attorney General of Australia	13 May 2025	Incumbent	1 year, 138 days

== South American ministers ==
The following list includes all women who have served as national justice ministers or analogous governmental officials in South America. Politicians are listed based on the starting dates of their tenures.

denotes an incumbent justice minister or equivalent officeholder

Name	Image	Country	Title	Mandate start	Mandate end	Term length
Adriana Olguín	Portrait of Adriana Olguín	Chile	Minister of Justice and Human Rights	29 July 1952	3 November 1952	97 days
Mónica Madariaga	Portrait of Mónica Madariaga	Chile	Minister of Justice and Human Rights	20 April 1977	14 February 1983	5 years, 300 days
Mónica de Greiff		Colombia	Minister of Justice and Law	16 July 1989	7 August 1990	1 year, 22 days
Alma Beatriz Rengifo López		Colombia	Minister of Justice and Law	21 April 1997	7 August 1998	1 year, 108 days
Soledad Alvear	Portrait of Soledad Alvear	Chile	Minister of Justice and Human Rights	11 March 2000	1 October 2004	4 years, 204 days
Johana Pesántez	Portrait of Johana Pesántez	Ecuador	Minister of Justice, Human Rights and Cults	13 May 2011	18 June 2013	2 years, 36 days
Ruth Stella Correa Palacio		Colombia	Minister of Justice and Law	12 July 2012	13 September 2013	1 year, 63 days
Patricia Pérez Goldberg	Portrait of Patricia Pérez Goldberg	Chile	Minister of Justice and Human Rights	17 December 2012	11 March 2014	1 year, 84 days
Sheila Abed		Paraguay	Minister of Justice	15 August 2013	15 August 2018	5 years, 0 days
Ledy Zúñiga Rocha		Ecuador	Minister of Justice, Human Rights and Cults	19 November 2013	24 May 2017	3 years, 186 days
Virginia Velasco Condori		Bolivia	Minister of Justice and Institutional Transparency	22 January 2015	23 January 2017	2 years, 1 day
Rosana Alvarado	Portrait of Rosana Alvarado	Ecuador	Minister of Justice, Human Rights and Cults	24 May 2017	23 August 2018	1 year, 91 days
Gloria María Borrero	Portrait of Gloria María Borrero	Colombia	Minister of Justice and Law	7 August 2018	16 May 2019	282 days
Margarita Cabello Blanco		Colombia	Minister of Justice and Law	11 June 2019	17 August 2020	1 year, 72 days
Cecilia Chacón Castillo	Portrait of Cecilia Chacón Castillo	Ecuador	Minister of Justice, Human Rights and Cults	3 July 2019	24 May 2021	1 year, 325 days
Marcela Losardo	Portrait of Marcela Losardo	Argentina	Minister of Justice and Human Rights	10 December 2019	29 March 2021	1 year, 109 days
Bernarda Ordóñez Moscoso	Portrait of Bernarda Ordóñez Moscoso	Ecuador	Minister of Justice, Human Rights and Cults	24 May 2021	5 May 2022	346 days
Marcela Ríos	Portrait of Marcela Ríos	Chile	Minister of Justice and Human Rights	11 March 2022	7 January 2023	302 days
Paola Flores Jaramillo	Portrait of Paola Flores Jaramillo	Ecuador	Minister of Justice, Human Rights and Cults	5 May 2022	Incumbent	4 years, 146 days

== See also ==
- List of female state attorneys general in the United States
- Women in law

Additional lists of female ministers

- List of female defence ministers
- List of female finance ministers
- List of female foreign ministers
- List of female interior ministers
