= Ministry of Justice and Peace (Costa Rica) =

- Ministerio de Justicia y Paz
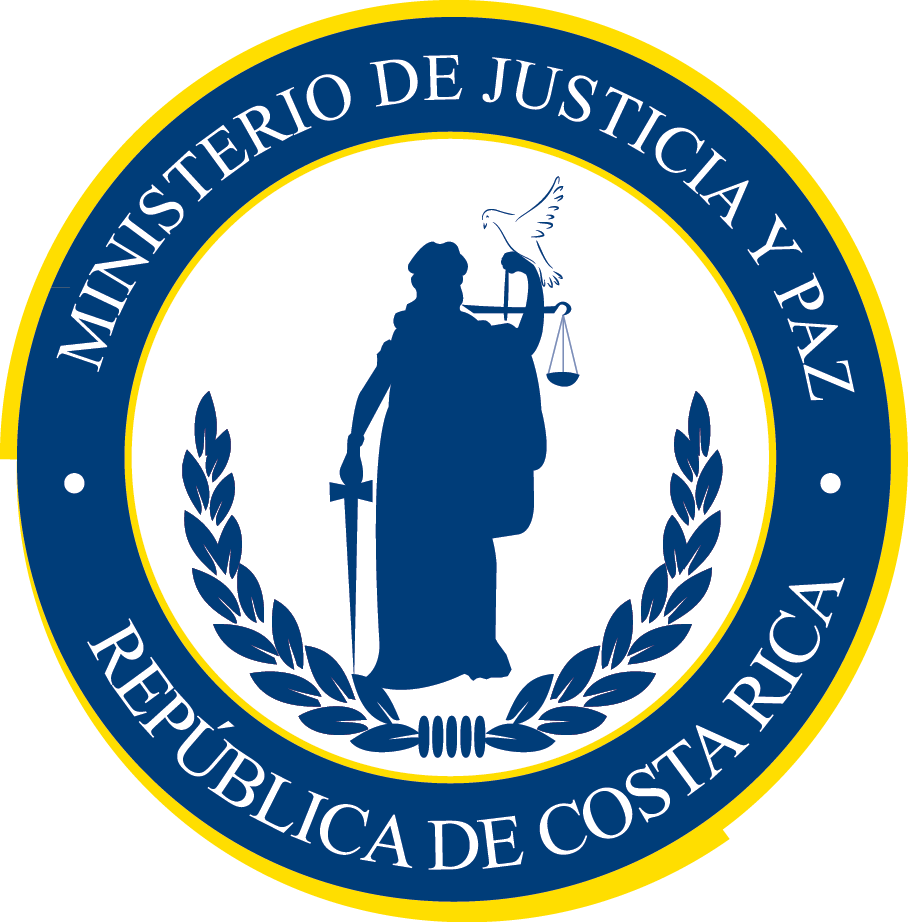

Ministry overview
- Formed: 1870; 156 years ago (first creation)
- Jurisdiction: Government of Costa Rica
- Headquarters: Avenida 12, Calle 1. 10104. Barrio La Dolorosa, Merced, San José
- Annual budget: ₡ 153.020.984.000 (2020)
- Minister responsible: Gerald Campos Valverde
- Website: Official website

The Ministry of Justice and Peace of Costa Rica is the ministerial body in charge of administering the country's prisons, assisting the rehabilitation and social reintegration of the prison population, and representing the interests of the State through the General Procurator's Office in Costa Rica.

In 1847, the Constitution established the first precedent of the Ministry of Interior, Foreign Affairs, Governance, Justice and Ecclesiastical Affairs. It would not be until June 29, 1870 that the Ministry of Justice was created by decree by Bruno Carranza and Lorenzo Montúfar. The ministry would undergo several changes by decrees over the century to follow. On April 28, 1982, the Organic Law of the Ministry of Justice dictated that the minister would be assigned the following responsibilities:

- The General Directorate of Social Adaptation and the Board of Construction, Installations and Acquisition of Goods dependence of that Directorate.
- The Attorney General's Office of the Republic.
- The Administrative Board of the National Registry.
- The Latin American Institute of the United Nations for the Prevention of Crime and Treatment of Offenders ILANUD.
- The Administrative Board of the Civic Centers.
- The National Directorate of Notaries.

== List of ministers (1990–present) ==
- Mari Eugenia Chacon Pacheco (1990)
- Elizabeth Odio Benito (1991-1994)
- Enrique Castillo Barrantes (1994-1995)
- Maureen Clarke (1996)
- Juan Diego Castro (1996-1997)
- Fabian Volio Echeverria (1997-1998)
- Mónica Nágel Berger (1998-2002)
- Jose Miguel Villalobos (2002-2004)
- Patricia Vega Herrera (2004-2006)
- Laura Chinchilla Miranda (2006-2008)
- Viviana Martín Salazar (2008-2009)
- Hernando Paris Rodriguez (2009-2012)
- Fernando Ferraro (2012-2013)
- Ana Isabel Garita Vílchez (2013-2014)
- Cristina Ramirez Chavarria (2014-2016)
- Cecilia Sánchez Romero (2016-2018)
- Marco Feoli Villalobos (2018)
- Marcia González Aguiluz (2018-2020)
- Fiorella Salazar Rojas (2020-present)
- Gerald Campos Valverde (2022-present)

== See also ==
- Justice ministry
- Ministerio de Justicia y Paz (Costa Rica) [Minister of Justice and Peace (Costa Rica)]
- Politics of Costa Rica
