= Ministério da Justiça =

Ministério da Justiça, the Portuguese term for "Ministry of Justice", may refer to:

- Ministry of Justice and Human Rights (Angola) (Portuguese: Ministério da Justiça e dos Direitos Humanos)
- Ministry of Justice and Public Security (Brazil) (Portuguese: Ministério da Justiça e Segurança Pública)
- Ministry of Justice (Cape Verde)
- Ministry of Justice and Human Rights (Guinea-Bissau) (Portuguese: Ministério da Justiça e dos Direitos Humanos)
- Ministry of Justice, Constitutional and Religious Affairs of Mozambique (Portuguese: Ministério da Justiça, Assuntos Constitucionais e Religiosos)
- Ministry of Justice (Portugal)
- Ministry of Justice, Parliamentary Affairs and Women's Rights (São Tomé and Príncipe) (Portuguese: Ministério da Justiça, Assuntos Parlamentares e Direitos da Mulher)
- Ministry of Justice (Timor-Leste)
