= Nancy Hernández López =

Costa Rican judge

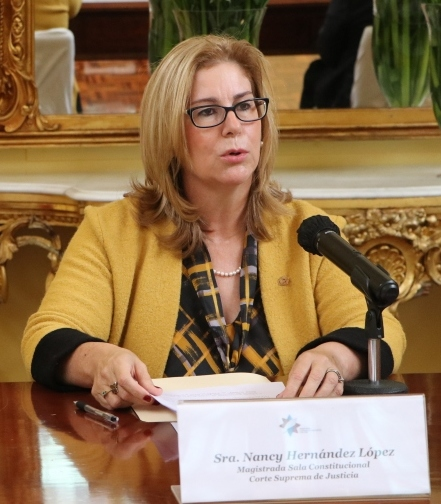
- Hernández in 2021

Judge of the Inter-American Court of Human Rights
- Incumbent
- Assumed office 1 January 2022
- Nominated by: Costa Rica
- Preceded by: Elizabeth Odio Benito

Judge of the Supreme Court of Justice of Costa Rica
- In office 3 December 2013 – 2 December 2021

Personal details
- Born: 28 October 1963 (age 62) San José, Costa Rica
- Children: 1
- Education: Escuela Libre de Derecho; University of Costa Rica; University for International Cooperation

Nancy Julieta Hernández López (born 1963) is a Costa Rican lawyer, professor, judge, and current member of the Inter-American Court of Human Rights with respect to Costa Rica since 2022 and was its president between 2024 and 2025. She previously served as judge of the Constitutional Chamber of the Supreme Court of Justice of Costa Rica between 2013 and 2021.

== Early life and education ==
Born on 28 October 1963, Hernández grew up in the neighbourhood of Holanda, in San José, Costa Rica. As a child and teenager, she was an athlete, especially taking up swimming, where she played with the national team and became one of the country's best in the 50- and 100-metre breaststroke events and won the gold medal in the 100-metre breaststroke at the first Central American Games in the 1970s.

Although at first she wanted to study veterinary medicine or marine biology, Hernández graduated with a law degree from the Escuela Libre de Derecho in 1987. She subsequently obtained a master's degree in tax law from the University for International Cooperation in 1998 and a master's degree in public law from the University of Costa Rica. In 2024, she was awarded an honorary doctorate by the Brazilian Institute of Education, Development and Research (IDP).

== Career ==
She began working at the Intellectual Property and Trade Marks Registry. Between 1990 and 1992, she served as an adviser to the Ministry of Justice and Peace where she was the first woman to be responsible for monitoring the observance of detainees’ human rights in the penitenciary system. During those years, she also served as legal adviser to the former president of the Inter-American Court of Human Rights, Rodolfo Piza.

President of the Supreme Court of Justice of Costa Rica Luis Paulino Mora Mora called her to ask her to be his adviser in 1999. She subsequently served as a legal adviser to the Constitutional Chamber of the Supreme Court of Justice of Costa Rica for 25 years, until 2013, when she was appointed as a judge to fill the vacancy left by the death of Luis Paulino Mora. Between 2009 and 2013 she was the head of the office of the court's president.

As judge Hernández helped draft Costa Rica's HIV-AIDS Act, the Code on Children and Adolescents, the amendment to Article 168 of the Electoral Code to allow polling stations to be set up in prisons and guarantee the right to vote for convicted prisoners, the Victims and Witnesses Protection Act, and the amendments to the Weapons and Explosives Act. She also participated in drafting amendments to the Law on the Criminalisation of Violence against Women and the Constitutional Jurisdiction Act, and was the drafter of the 2017 Regulations on the Regulation of Conflicts of Interest in the Judiciary.

In 2018, alongside Judge Fernando Cruz Castro, in the ruling on same-sex marriage in Costa Rica, Hernández took one of the most supportive stances in favour of its recognition. She initially argued for the legal ban to be declared unconstitutional with immediate effect, although he ultimately supported the majority decision to grant an 18-month period to bring the legislation into line. Furthermore, Hernández proposed removing the criminal and administrative provisions that stood in the way of equal marriage, including the restrictions imposed on notaries.

She has held various posts relating to the promotion of human rights, including as a member of the National AIDS Commission (1990–1992), a consultant to the Pan American Health Organisation on HIV/AIDS in prisons (1998), co-founder and vice-president of the Costa Rican Association of Constitutional Law, member of the Commission on International Humanitarian Law representing the Judiciary, representative of the Constitutional Chamber before the Venice Commission (2020) and member of the editorial board of the Yearbook of Latin American Constitutional Law (2021). She has also promoted initiatives to raise awareness of constitutional law and civil liberties in Costa Rica.

In the academic sphere, she taught human rights and constitutional jurisdiction at La Salle University between 1999 and 2009, and since 2010 she has been a lecturer on the Master's programmes in Constitutional Law, Public Law and Criminal Sciences at the University of Costa Rica. Since 2023, Hernández has been a visiting professor on the human rights Master's programmes at the Autonomous University of Madrid.

On 27 January 2021, the Costa Rican government announced that it would nominate Hernández as a judge of the Inter-American Court of Human Rights to replace Elizabeth Odio Benito, who had decided not to stand for re-election for a further term. On 20 September 2021, Hernández informed the Legislative Assembly of her intention to avail herself of the automatic re-election and that day the legislative committee unanimously approved, recommendation to the Plenary that Hernández should serve a further eight years on the Constitutional Chamber. Four days Hernández was elected in the first round as a judge of the Inter-American Court of Human Rights for the term commencing on 1 January 2022. She received 16 votes from the member states of the Organisation of American States. Between 1 January 2024 and 31 December 2025 she served as its president.

In April 2025 she met with Venezuelan exiled oppositor Edmundo González.

== Persona life ==
She has two sisters. She is married and has a son.
