= Maruja Chacón Pacheco =

Costa Rican politician

Minister of Justice and Peace
- In office 1990–1991
- Succeeded by: Elizabeth Odio Benito

Maruja (Mari) Eugenia Chacon Pacheco is a Costa Rican politician who was Minister of Justice and Peace.

== See also ==
- List of female justice ministers
