= Garita =

Garita may refer to:

- Bartizan, an overhanging turret projecting from the walls of mediaeval fortifications
- Garita (checkpoint), a federal highway checkpoint in Mexico
- Ana Isabel Garita Vílchez, Costa Rican politician
