= Ministry of Justice (Cape Verde) =

The Ministry of Justice and Labor of Cape Verde oversees the operations of the prison officers, judicial police (Policia Judiciaria), official justice (Cofre Geral de Justica), notaries, and other legal professionals.

== List of ministers (Post-1975 upon achieving independence) ==
- David Hoppfer Cordeiro de Almada (1975–1986)
- Jose Eduardo Figueiredo Araujo (1987–1988)
- Pedro Pires (1989)
- Corsino Fortes (1990–1991)
- Eurico Correia Monteiro (1991–1994)
- Pedro Friere (1995–1996)
- Simao Rodrigues Monteiro (1996–1999)
- Januaria Moreira (1999–2001) [1st female]
- Cristina Fones Lima (2001–2006)
- Jose Manuel Andrade (2006–2008)
- Marisa Helena Morias (2008–2011)
- Jose Carlos Lopes Correia (2011–2016)
- Janine Lélis (2016–2021)
- Joana Rosa (2021–2026)

== See also ==
- Justice ministry
- Politics of Cape Verde
