= Cecilia Sánchez =

Cecilia Sánchez may refer to:

- Cecilia Sánchez García (born 1959), Mexican trade-unionist and politician
- Cecilia Sánchez Romero, Costa Rican jurist and politician
