= Vílchez =

Vílchez or Vilchez is a surname. Notable people with the surname include:

- Ana Isabel Garita Vílchez, Costa Rican politician
- Francisco Javier Rodríguez Vílchez (born 1978), Spanish footballer who currently plays for Alicante CF, as a striker
- Manuel Vilchez (born 1961), former Venezuelan boxer
- Nidia Vílchez (born 1964), Peruvian politician and Congresswoman representing Junín for the 2006–2011 term
- Oscar Vílchez (born 1986), Peruvian football attacking midfielder, currently playing for Alianza Lima
- Walter Vílchez (born 1982), Peruvian football player
