= Claire Hepburn =

Bahamian judge

Attorney General and Minister of Legal Affairs
- In office 2007 – 7 July 2008

Member of the Bahamian Senate
- In office 4 May 2007 – 7 July 2008

Personal details
- Born: Nassau, The Bahamas
- Party: Free National Movement
- Education: University of the West Indies; University of Miami

Claire Hepburn is a Bahamian judge.

== Biography ==
Hepburn was born in Nassau.

She was educated at the Government High School, Nassau and graduated from the University of the West Indies, Jamaica and the University of Miami, USA. On 27 September 1985, Hepburn was admitted as Counsel and Attorney of the Supreme Court of The Bahamas.

Following the 2007 Bahamian general election, Hepburn was appointed to the Bahamian Senate and was made justice minister.

In 2008, she was appointed as a Supreme Court Justice. In 2020, she received an honour from Governor General Sir Cornelius A. Smith.

== Personal life ==
Claire Hepburn is an Anglican. She is married to Livingston Hepburn and they are parents of two children, a son Ian Andre Hepburn and a daughter Tara Xavier Hepburn. A law student, she died at the age of 30.

In her daughters memory, she is a director of The Tara Xavier Hepburn Foundation and one of the co-ordinators of the T.A.R.A. Project.

== See also ==
- List of female justice ministers
