= Joana Rosa =

Cape Verdean politician

- Rosa in 2026

Minister of Justice
- In office May 2021 – June 2026
- Prime Minister: Ulisses Correia e Silva
- Preceded by: Janine Lélis

Personal details
- Born: Joana Gomes Rosa Amado Maio, Cape Verde
- Party: Movement for Democracy
- Education: Fluminense Federal University; University of Lisbon
- Occupation: Politician

Joana Gomes Rosa Amado is a Cape Verdean politician who most recently served as the minister of justice of Cape Verde from 2021 to 2026. Prior to that, she was a parliamentary leader of the majority Movement for Democracy party.

== Early life and education ==
Rosa was born in the parish of Nossa Senhora da Luz, on the island of Maio, where she completed her primary education. She attended secondary school in the country's capital of Praia. She obtained a law degree from the Fluminense Federal University in Niterói, Brazil and followed this with a postgraduate degree in banking law from the Institute of Legal Cooperation of the University of Lisbon. She took a course in administration at the National Administration School (CENFA) in Guinea-Bissau, and obtained a master's degree in governance and administration from the National Institute of Administration in Lisbon.

== Career ==
Rosa initially worked as a lawyer and a legal advisor. In 1994 and 1995 she was director of the cabinet of the minister of agriculture. In 1995, she became the first woman to run for mayor in Cape Verde. While not succeeding to be elected in Maio, she was elected president of the island of São Vicente for two terms. She was elected as a deputy in the Cape Verdean parliament for the first time in 2006 and since then she has held several positions in the parliament. She was vice-president of the 2010 Constitutional Review Commission and of the Legal Affairs Committee. In 2020 she was elected as leader of the majority Movement for Democracy Party (MfD) in parliament, winning 28 of the 34 votes cast, having previously served as vice-president. She was appointed as the country's minister of justice in May 2021, following the 2021 parliamentary elections.

Rosa ran in the 2026 Cape Verdean presidential election, but lost to the incumbent, José Maria Neves, garnering 31.39% in the first round on 15 November.
