= Cecilia Chacón Castillo =

Ecuadorian politician

Secretary of Human Rights of Ecuador
- In office 3 July 2019 – 24 May 2021
- President: Lenin Moreno
- Minister: Secretaria de Derechos Humanos del Ecuador
- Preceded by: Marlo Pacífico Brito Fuentes
- Succeeded by: María Bernarda Ordoñez Moscoso

Personal details
- Born: August 4, 1972 (age 54) Latacunga, Ecuador

Cecilia Chacón Castillo (born August 4, 1972) is an Ecuadorian politician who was Secretary of Human Rights.

== Education ==
She holds a degree in Social Communication from the Technical University of Ambato.

== See also ==
- List of female justice ministers
