= Patricia Vega Herrera =

Costa Rican politician

Minister of Justice and Peace
- In office November 25, 2002 – May 8, 2006
- Preceded by: Jose Miguel Villalobos
- Succeeded by: Laura Chinchilla

Personal details
- Born: 1963 (age 62–63)
- Party: Social Christian Unity Party

Patricia Vega Herrera (born 1963) is a Costa Rican lawyer and politician who was Minister of Justice and Peace.

== See also ==
- List of female justice ministers
