= Mónica Nágel Berger =

Costa Rican politician

Minister of Justice and Peace
- In office May 8, 1998 – May 8, 2002
- Preceded by: Fabian Volio Echeverria
- Succeeded by: Jose Miguel Villalobos

Personal details
- Born: May 5, 1960 (age 66) Santiago, Chile

Mónica Nágel Berger (born May 5, 1960) is a Costa Rican politician and lawyer who was Minister of Justice and Peace. She was the executive president of the National Insurance Institute (INS).

== See also ==
- List of female justice ministers
