= Marco Feoli Villalobos =

Costa Rican lawyer and university professor

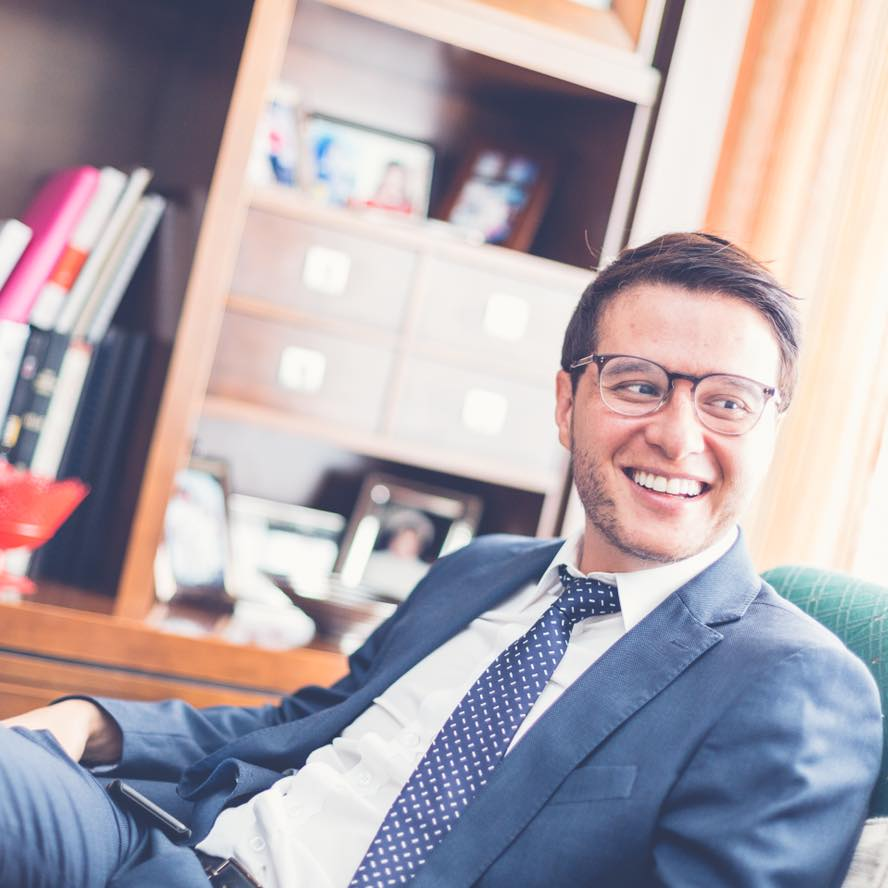

Minister of Justice of Costa Rica
- In office 3 January 2018 – 8 May 2018
- President: Luis Guillermo Solís
- Preceded by: María Cecilia Sánchez Romero
- Succeeded by: Marcia González Aguiluz

Personal details
- Born: Marco Feoli Villalobos; January 9, 1979 (age 47) San José, Costa Rica
- Education: University of Costa Rica; University of Salamanca

Marco Feoli Villalobos (born 9 January 1979) is a Costa Rican lawyer and university professor, and currently a member of the Subcommittee for the Prevention of Torture at the United Nations. Feoli was previously the Vice Minister of Justice and Peace of Costa Rica during the government of President Luis Guillermo Solís. Feoli is the third Costa Rican to serve on the subcommittee. He is also a university professor at the National University of Costa Rica.

== Biography ==
Feoli was born in San José, Costa Rica on 9 January 1979. He studied at the José Ezequiel González Vindas School and at the Claretian College in Heredia Province. He then studied at the University of Costa Rica, where he obtained a law degree. Subsequently, he completed a master's degree in human rights and education for peace from the National University of Costa Rica and with the help of a scholarship from the Spanish Agency for International Development Cooperation, completed a master's degree in democracy and good governance from the University of Salamanca in Spain.

== Publications ==
- Justicia penal en construcción: luces y sombras de la reforma procesal dos décadas después. Editorial Investigaciones Jurídicas. San José. 2021. (Criminal justice under construction: lights and shadows of the procedural reform two decades later)
- Vis a Vis: Reincidencia y sanción penal (con Jesús Sáenz). Revista NuevoHumanismo, 7(2). (Vis a Vis: Recidivism and criminal sanction (with Jesús Sáenz))
- Jueces protagonistas: ¿un replanteamiento de la relación entre política y justicia?, Editorial UCR, San José, 2015. (Protagonist judges: a rethinking of the relationship between politics and justice?)
