= Viviana Martín Salazar =

Costa Rican politician

Minister of Justice and Peace
- In office 2008–2009
- Preceded by: Laura Chinchilla Miranda
- Succeeded by: Hernando Paris Rodriguez

Viviana Martín Salazar is a Costa Rican politician who served as Minister of Justice and Peace and as Deputy Minister of Transport.

== See also ==
- List of female justice ministers
