= 2026 Cape Verdean presidential election =

Re-election of José Maria Neves

- 15 November 2026
- Registered: 419,448
- Turnout: 31.69%
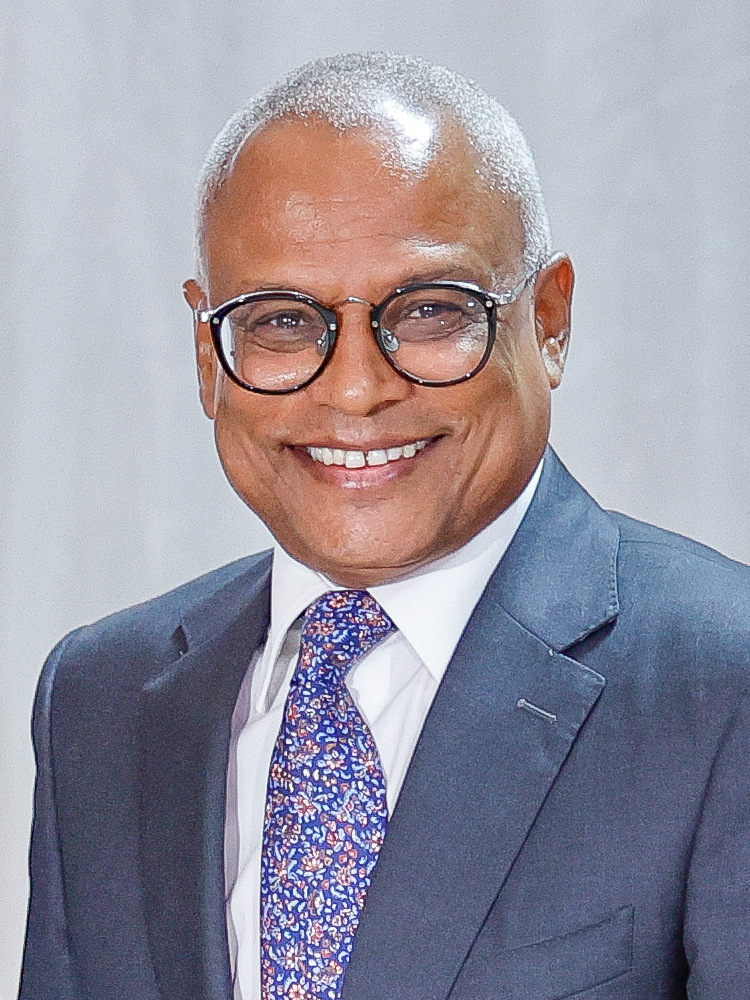

Nominee	José Maria Neves	Joana Rosa
Party	PAICV	MpD
Popular vote	82,602	40,530
Percentage	63.98%	31.39%
President before election
José Maria Neves
PAICV
Elected President
José Maria Neves
PAICV

Presidential elections were held in Cape Verde on 15 November 2026. Incumbent president José Maria Neves won a second consecutive term against Joana Rosa.

== Background ==
PAICV candidate José Maria Neves was elected president in the first round with over 51% of the vote in 2021. This was the first time the PAICV won a presidential election since 2006, when Pedro Pires was re-elected president for a second term. At the time, the government was headed by MpD, with Ulisses Correa e Silva as prime minister in what is known as a cohabitation. Since then, in the 2026 Cape Verdean parliamentary election, a PAICV government has come to power under Francisco Carvalho.

== Electoral system ==
The president was elected using the two-round system by registered voters residing in the country and abroad. Eligible candidates must be citizens "of Cape Verdean origin, who hold no other nationality"; over 35 years of age on the date of candidacy; and have resided in the country for three years prior to that date. The application to register as a candidate must be presented to the Constitutional Court for approval, and requires the signatures of at least 1,000 and at most 4,000 electors.

== Candidates ==
=== Confirmed ===
- José Maria Neves (African Party for the Independence of Cape Verde), President of Cape Verde (since 2021).
- Joana Rosa (Movement for Democracy), Minister of Justice (2021–2026).

== Results ==
Incumbent president and PAICV candidate José Maria Neves was re-elected to a second consecutive term in the first round.

Candidate	Party	Votes	%
José Maria Neves	African Party for the Independence of Cape Verde	82,602	63.98
Joana Rosa	Movement for Democracy	40,530	31.39
Gilson dos Santos Alves	Independent	1,803	1.40
Antero Lúcio Lopes Francês Tavares	Independent	1,632	1.26
Casimiro Pina	Independent	1,455	1.13
Loisito Tavares de Sousa	Independent	1,093	0.85
Total		129,115	100.00
Valid votes		129,115	97.14
Invalid votes		968	0.73
Blank votes		2,833	2.13
Total votes		132,916	100.00
Registered voters/turnout		419,448	31.69
Source: CNE
