= Marcia González Aguiluz =

Costa Rican lawyer and politician (born 1969)

Minister of Justice and Peace
- In office 8 May 2018 – 7 February 2020
- Preceded by: Marco Feoli Villalobos

Personal details
- Born: 16 January 1969 (age 57) San José, Costa Rica
- Party: Citizen's Action

Marcia González Aguiluz (born 16 January 1969) is a Costa Rican politician and lawyer who served as the minister of justice and peace under President Carlos Alvarado Quesada between 2018 and 2020.

She resigned in February 2020. She may run in the 2022 Costa Rican general election.
