= Marisa Morais =

Cape Verdean politician

Minister for Justice
- In office 2008–2011
- President: Pedro Pires
- Preceded by: Jose Manuel Andrade
- Succeeded by: Jose Carlos Lopes Correia

Marisa Helena do Nascimento Morais is a Cape Verdean politician who served as Minister of Justice. She was legal advisor to the President of the Republic until 2023.
