= Cristina Ramírez Chavarría =

Costa Rican politician

Cristina Ramirez Chavarría

Minister of Justice and Peace
- In office 2014–2016
- Preceded by: Fernando Ferraro
- Succeeded by: Cecilia Sánchez Romero

Cristina Ramírez Chavarría is a Costa Rican politician who was Minister of Justice and Peace.

== See also ==
- List of female justice ministers
