= Ana Isabel Garita Vílchez =

Costa Rican politician

Minister of Justice and Peace
- In office 2013–2014
- President: Laura Chinchilla
- Preceded by: Fernando Ferraro
- Succeeded by: Cristina Ramirez Chavarria

Ana Isabel Garita Vílchez is a Costa Rican politician who was Minister of Justice and Peace. She was an advisor on transitional justice for UN Women.

== See also ==
- List of female justice ministers
