= Cristina Fontes Lima =

Cape Verdean lawyer and politician

Maria Cristina Lopes Almeida Fontes Lima (born 1958) is a Cape Verdean lawyer and politician who served as minister of justice from 2001 to 2006, Minister of Defence from 2006 to 2011 and Deputy Prime Minister and Minister of Health from 2011 to 2016.

== Early life and education ==
Fontes Lima was born in 1958. In 1981 she earned a Law Degree from the Faculdade de Direito da Universidade Clássica de Lisboa. In 1996, she attained a Master of Public Administration from Southern Illinois University.

== Career ==
Fontes Lima is a member of the African Party for the Independence of Cape Verde. She was appointed to cabinet by Prime Minister José Maria Neves on 13 January 2001, as Minister of Justice. She served in this role until 8 March 2006, when she was appointed Minister of the Presidency of the Council of Ministers, Minister of Reform of the State and Minister of Defence.

In 2011, Fontes Lima was appointed Minister of Health and Deputy Prime Minister. As Health Minister, she oversaw the nation's responses to the Ebola epidemic in neighbouring countries and the Zika epidemic that affected more than 7000 people in Cape Verde. In February 2014, she led the signing of a national health compact.

In December 2014, when Neves decided not to run for a fourth term, Fontes Lima was a candidate for the party's leadership. She came third with 8.5% of the vote to Janira Hopffer Almada (51.2%) and parliamentary leader Felisberto Alves Vieira (40.3%). She left the executive after party's defeat at the 2016 election.

In September 2016, Fontes Lima was a candidate for the city council of Praia, but was defeated by Movement for Democracy candidate Oscar Santos who had replaced Ulisses Correia e Silva when he left to run for the country's leadership.
