= Cecilia Sánchez Romero =

Costa Rican politician

Minister of Justice and Peace
- In office 2016–2018
- Preceded by: Cristina Ramirez Chavarria
- Succeeded by: Marco Feoli Villalobos

María Cecilia de los Ángeles Sánchez Romero is a Costa Rican politician who was Minister of Justice and Peace.

In 2015, President Luis Guillermo Solís asked her to join his cabinet as minister of justice and peace. She served until the end of 2017, when she left to lead the United Nations–affiliated Latin American Institute for the Prevention of Crime and the Treatment of Offenders (ILANUD).

== See also ==
- List of female justice ministers
