= Carmelita Pires =

Bissau-Guinean lawyer and politician

- Born: November 16, 1963 (age 62); Bissau
- Education: University of Coimbra, University of Lisbon
- Occupation: Politician
- Known for: Minister for Justice
- Predecessor: Maria Berger
- Successor: Tuija Brax
- Political party: United Social Democratic Party

Carmelita Pires (born November 16, 1963) is a Bissau-Guinean lawyer and politician. She was the Minister for Justice. She was the third woman to be a minister in her country.

== Life ==
Pires was born in Bissau in 1963. She studied law at the University of Coimbra before going to the University of Lisbon where she obtained a master's degree in legal and political sciences.

She became the Minister for Justice on 13 April 2007.

In July 2008 she received death threats by phone which she believed was because of progress made against drug dealers with the assistance of the United Nations. She ceased to be a minister in 2009. She believed that a thorough review was required of the justice system was required. The USA described Guinea Bissau as a narco state. 200 to 300 tonnes of cocaine pass through the state whereas the estimated value of the country's gross domestic product is equal to just 6 tonnes of cocaine.

In November 2012 she stopped three years work advising the President of the Economic Community of West African States about drug trafficking. She noted that trafficking drugs infiltrated even the top levels of government in Guinea-Bissau.

In October 2013 she was elected leader of the United Social Democratic Party (PUSD) by 264 votes out of the 274. Pires said that she did not intend to run for President of the country. The party had no representation in parliament but it had 17 deputies at the National People's Assembly. Her party's priorities would be Education, Health and Social Security.

In May 2020 President, Umaro Sissoco Embaló announced that she had been appointed to join the five person constitutional review committee led by Carlos Joaquim Vamain.
