= Fiorella Salazar Rojas =

Costa Rican politician (born 1976)

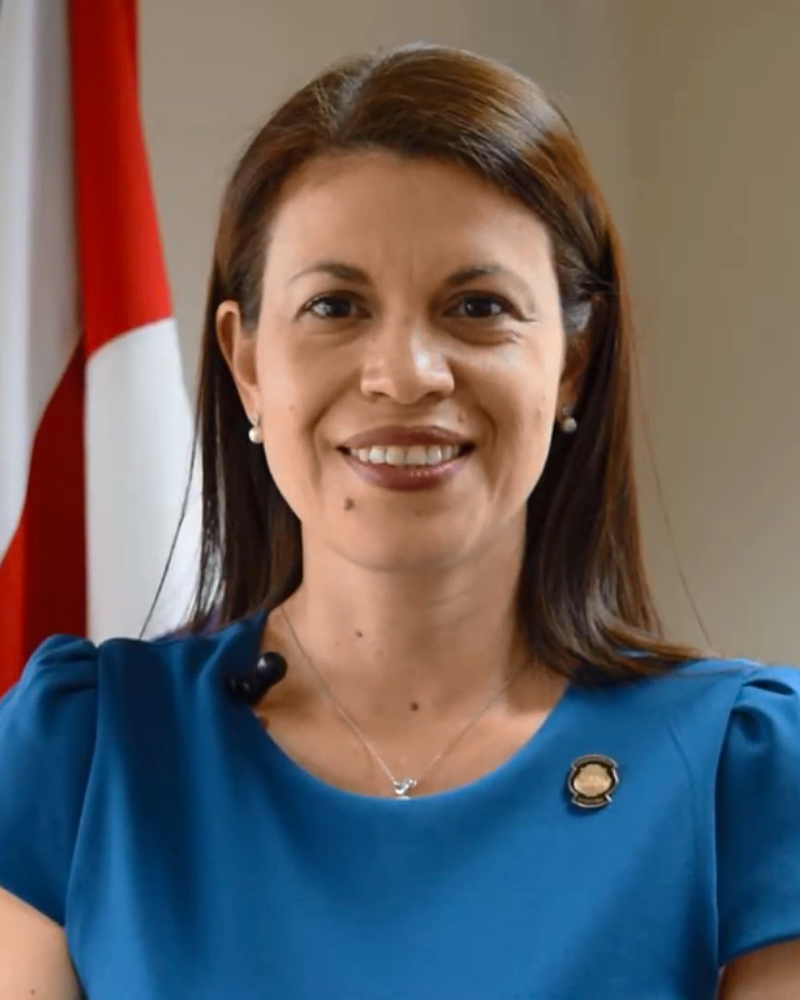
Fiorella Salazar Rojas in 2021.

Fiorella Salazar Rojas (born 26 April 1976) is a Costa Rican politician. She has served as Justice minister since 2020 under Presidents Carlos Alvarado Quesada and Rodrigo Chaves Robles.
