= Januaria Moreira =

Cape Verdean politician

Minister of Justice
- In office 1999–2001

Personal details
- Education: University of Lisbon

Januária Tavares Silva Moreira Costa is a Cape Verdean Judge, the former minister of Justice of the federation and a member of the Portuguese Bar Association.

== Education ==
Moreira obtained her LLB in Law from University of Lisbon. In 1995 and 1996, she attended a one year Training Course at the Centre for Judicial Studies.

== Career ==
Moreiera started her journey as a lawyer in 1991 under the tutelage of Portuguese bar Association. In 1993, she was employed as a teacher at Domingos Ramos High School up till 1993. In 1995, she served as the permanent correspondence of Minister of Justice of Portuguese Speaking Countries. In 1999, she was appointed as the Minister of Justice up till 2001. She also served as Economic Community of West Africa State for four years.

== Membership ==
She is a member of the Capverdean Bar Association and Portuguese Bar Association.
