= Maureen Clarke =

Costa Rican lawyer

President of the Inter-American Commission of Women
- In office 2013–2015

Minister of Women
- In office 2012–2013

First Deputy Mayor of San José
- In office 2003–2009

Personal details
- Born: Maureen Cecilia Clarke Clarke; 22 November 1952 (age 73) Limón, Costa Rica
- Education: University of Costa Rica
- Profession: Attorney

Maureen Cecilia Clarke Clarke (born 22 November 1952) is a Costa Rican attorney and women's rights leader. She was president of the Inter-American Commission of Women (CIM; 2013–2015).

== Biography ==
Clarke was born in Limón in 1952. She attended Elementary Esmeralda Jimenez Oreamuno until 1965, Secondary Liceo Luis Dobles Segreda until 1971, and graduated from the University of Costa Rica in 1977 with a Bachelor of Law.

Clarke worked for 16 years as a Legal Adviser to the Ministry of Agriculture, during which she advised on international agreements and investments in the agricultural sector. She has served as Minister of Condición de la Mujer (2012–2013); First Deputy Mayor of San José (2003–2009); Minister of Justicia y Gracia (1995–1996); Minister of Gobernación y Policía (1994–1995); adviser in the Legislative Assembly (1999–2002), and as a coordinator with Red Centroamericana de Mujeres Rurales, Indígenas y Campesinas (RECMURIC). She has also served as the Executive President of the National Women's Institute and President of the Inter-American Commission of Women of the OAS.
