= Janine Lélis =

Cape Verdean politician

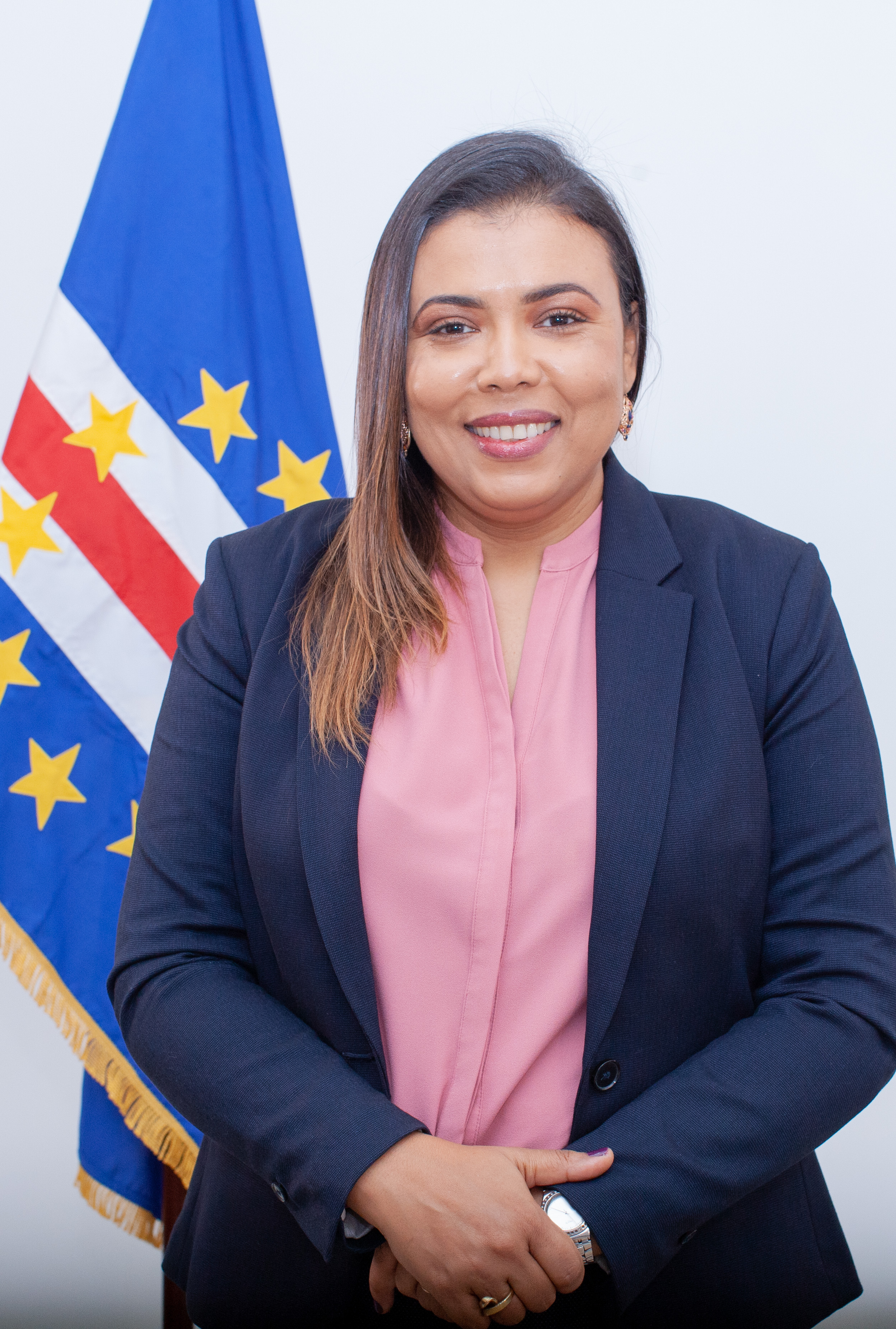
- Official portrait, 2021

Cape Verde Minister of State, National Defense & Territorial Cohesion
- In office 2021–2026
- President: José Maria Neves
- Prime Minister: Ulisses Correia e Silva
- Preceded by: Luís Filipe Tavares

Cape Verde Minister of Justice & Labor
- In office 2016–2021
- President: Jorge Carlos Fonseca
- Prime Minister: Ulisses Correia e Silva
- Preceded by: José Lopes Correia
- Succeeded by: Joana Rosa

Member of the Pan-African Parliament for Cape Verde
- In office 2011–2016

Personal details
- Born: 20 January 1974 (age 52)
- Party: Movement for Democracy
- Education: Federal University of Rio de Janeiro

Janine Tatiana Santos Lélis (born 20 January 1974) is a Cape Verdean lawyer and politician serving as the Minister of State, Defense and Territorial Cohesion. She was a member of African Parliament and national member of the Specialized Committee on Legal Affairs and President of CPI.

== Education ==
Lélis earned a Law degree from the Federal University of Rio de Janeiro and Post-graduate degree in Business and Labor Law in 2006.

== Career ==
Lélis legal career started at the TACV from 1998 to 2008 and was a member of the Justice Committee of the African Parliament and Vice-President of the Union of Young African Parliamentarians. From 2006 to 2016, she was a municipal member and leader of the Independent Group for Change and was elected to African Parliament from 2011 to 2016. She served as Minister of Justice and Labour before being transferred to the Ministry of Defense and Territorial Cohesion as Minister of State. She was a national member of the Specialized Committee on Legal Affairs and President of CPI from 2006 to 2016, and a member of the Supervisory Board of the Cape Verde Bar Association from 2004 to 2008, and lawyer since December 1998.
