= Elizabeth Odio Benito =

Costa Rican international human rights judge (born 1939)

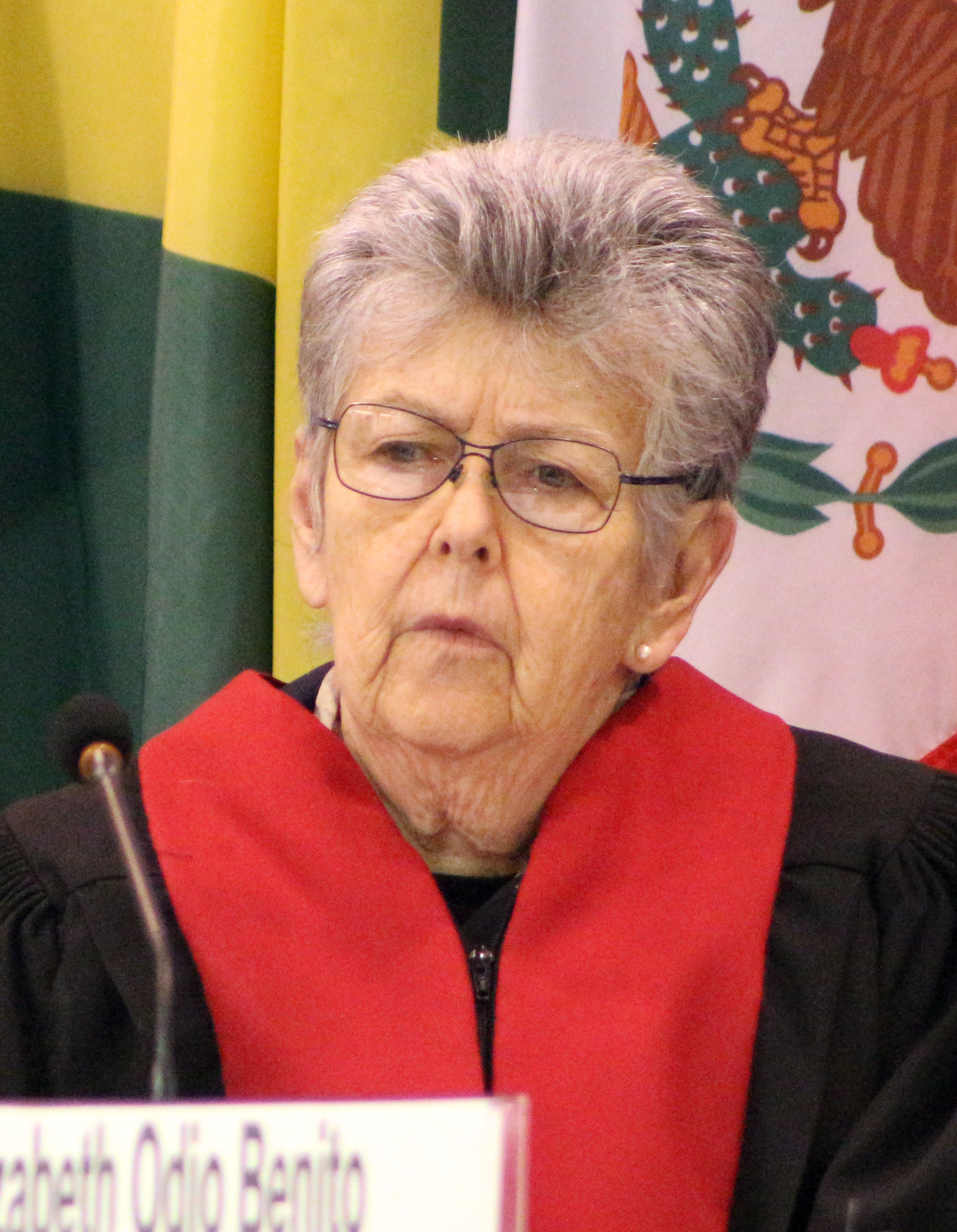
- Odio Benito in 2018

President of the Inter-American Court of Human Rights
- In office 1 January 2020 – 31 December 2021
- Preceded by: Eduardo Ferrer
- Succeeded by: Ricardo Pérez Manrique

Judge of the Inter-American Court of Human Rights
- In office 1 January 2016 – 31 December 2021
- Nominated by: Costa Rica
- Succeeded by: Nancy Hernández López

Second Vice-President of the International Criminal Court
- In office 11 March 2003 – 10 March 2006
- Appointed by: Judges of the ICC
- Preceded by: Office established
- Succeeded by: René Blattmann

Judge of the International Criminal Court
- In office 11 March 2003 – 31 August 2012
- Nominated by: Panama
- Appointed by: Assembly of States Parties

Second Vice-President of Costa Rica
- In office 8 May 1998 – 8 May 2002 Serving with Astrid Fischel
- President: Miguel Ángel Rodríguez
- Preceded by: Rebeca Grynspan
- Succeeded by: Luis Fishman

Minister of Environment and Energy
- In office 8 May 1998 – 8 May 2002
- President: Miguel Ángel Rodríguez
- Preceded by: René Castro Salazar
- Succeeded by: Carlos Rodríguez Echandi

Vice-President of the International Criminal Tribunal for the former Yugoslavia
- In office November 1993 – November 1995
- Preceded by: Office established
- Succeeded by: Adolphus Godwin Karibi-Whyte

Judge of the International Criminal Tribunal for the former Yugoslavia
- In office 17 November 1993 – 16 November 1998

Minister of Justice and Grace
- In office 8 May 1990 – 8 May 1994
- President: Rafael Ángel Calderón Fournier
- Preceded by: Maruja Chacón Pacheco
- Succeeded by: Enrique Castillo Barrantes
- In office 8 May 1978 – 8 May 1982
- President: Rodrigo Carazo Odio
- Preceded by: Milton Arias Calvo
- Succeeded by: Carlos Gutiérrez Gutiérrez

Personal details
- Born: Elizabeth Odio Benito; 15 September 1939 (age 86) Puntarenas, Costa Rica
- Party: PUSC
- Other political affiliations: Unity Coalition (1977–1983)
- Education: University of Costa Rica (LLB); University of Buenos Aires; National University of Costa Rica
- Occupation: Lawyer; judge; politician; professor; writer

Elizabeth Odio Benito (born 15 September 1939) is a Costa Rican jurist, academic and politician who served as President of the Inter-American Court of Human Rights from 2020 to 2021 and as Second Vice President of Costa Rica from 1998 to 2002. She has also served as Vice-President of the International Criminal Court and as a judge and Vice-President of the International Criminal Tribunal for the former Yugoslavia.

A member of the Social Christian Unity Party, Odio twice served as Minister of Justice and Grace from 1978 to 1982 and from 1990 to 1994. Throughout her career, she has specialized in human rights, international criminal law, and the rights of women.

== Early life and education ==
Although born in Puntarenas, the first child of Emiliano Odio Madrigal and Esperanza Benito Ibañez, most of her early life was spent in San José, where she attended the Colegio Superior de Señoritas. The law was something of a tradition on her father's side of the family; Odio Benito was particularly encouraged by her lawyer uncle, Ulises Odio Santos, to study that subject. She graduated with a master's degree from the University of Costa Rica in 1964, where she remained for much of her academic career, rising to a full professorship in 1986 and Vice-President for Academic Affairs in 1988. During this period, she began to work in the field of gender studies, with an emphasis on crimes committed against women.

== Political career in Costa Rica ==
From 1976 to 1978 she served as Secretary to the Colegio de Abogados, the bar association of Costa Rica, and in 1978 was appointed to the joint offices of Minister of Justice and Attorney General, which she held until 1982 when the National Liberation Party took the presidency. In 1990 she returned for another four-year term as Minister of Justice, under President Rafael Ángel Calderón Fournier. The peak of her domestic political career came in 1998, with her election as Second Vice-President alongside President Miguel Ángel Rodríguez and First Vice-President Astrid Fischel Volio; during this time she was also Minister for the Environment and Energy.

== Career in International Law ==
=== Judge of the International Criminal Tribunal for the former Yugoslavia, 1993–1998 ===
Odio Benito's involvement in international justice began during her second ministerial term, with her 1993 appointment as a judge on the International Criminal Tribunal for the former Yugoslavia. A major contribution during these proceedings was Odio Benito's successful effort to have rape and other sexual assaults considered as torture. Her interpretation, based on a case of two Serbian women raped in the Čelebići detention camp, is now an accepted principle of international law.

In 1998 Odio Benito left ICTY as a consequence of becoming Vice-President, but she continued to play an active role in related areas of the law. Most notably, she was president of the United Nations working group that drew up the Optional Protocol to the Convention Against Torture. Optional Protocol to the Convention against Torture and other Cruel, Inhuman or Degrading Treatment, or Punishment This additional treaty, open to any State that is party to the main UN Convention Against Torture anti-torture Convention, allows for international and independent national experts to visit any prison, detention camp, or similar facility, speak in private with people held there, and make recommendations to authorities aimed at preventing torture or other abuse from being practiced there. The Optional Protocol entered into force on 22 June 2006. As of 31 January 2007 it had 32 State Parties with a further 31 States have signed but not yet ratified the Protocol.

=== Judge of the International Criminal Court, 2003–2012 ===
Odio Benito's election to the International Criminal Court was not without controversy. Her candidacy had initially been sponsored by Costa Rica, but President Abel Pacheco withdrew support without explanation. Various women's groups mobilised to campaign for her readmittance.Center for the Study of Women She was eventually renominated by Panama, whose then president, Mireya Moscoso, is another noted activist for women's rights. Odio Benito was thus the only candidate not to be sponsored by her own nation. Nevertheless, she was elected in the first out of thirty-three rounds of voting, indicating strong support from the States Parties.

The ICC officially opened on 11 March 2003, with Elizabeth Odio Benito as Second Vice-President.

When the International Criminal Court sentenced Congolese warlord Thomas Lubanga to 14 years in prison in July 2012 for using child soldiers in his rebel army in 2002 and 2003 – the first sentence imposed by the court in its history –, Odio Benito disagreed with her two fellow judges and in a dissenting opinion said that 15 years would have been more appropriate given the harm done to the victims and their families, particularly due to harsh punishments and sexual violence against the UPC's child soldiers.

=== Judge of the Interamerican Court of Human Rights ===
Odio Benito served as a judge of the Inter-American Court of Human Rights from 2016 to 2021. She served as President in the Inter-American Court of Human Rights from 2020 to 2021. She was the second woman to hold this position.

== Lectures ==
Los crimenes de violencia sexual en el derecho internacional penal de los siglos XX y XXI (El nuevo orden jurídico internacional a partir de 1945 y su ausencia de perspectiva de genero) in the Lecture Series of the United Nations Audiovisual Library of International Law

== Awards ==
Odio was inducted into La Galería de las Mujeres de Costa Rica (The Costa Rican Gallery of Women) in 2002 for her contributions to human rights.
