= Siege of Galle (1640) =

1640 siege

Coordinates: 06°1′33″N 80°13′3″E

- Part of the Dutch–Portuguese War
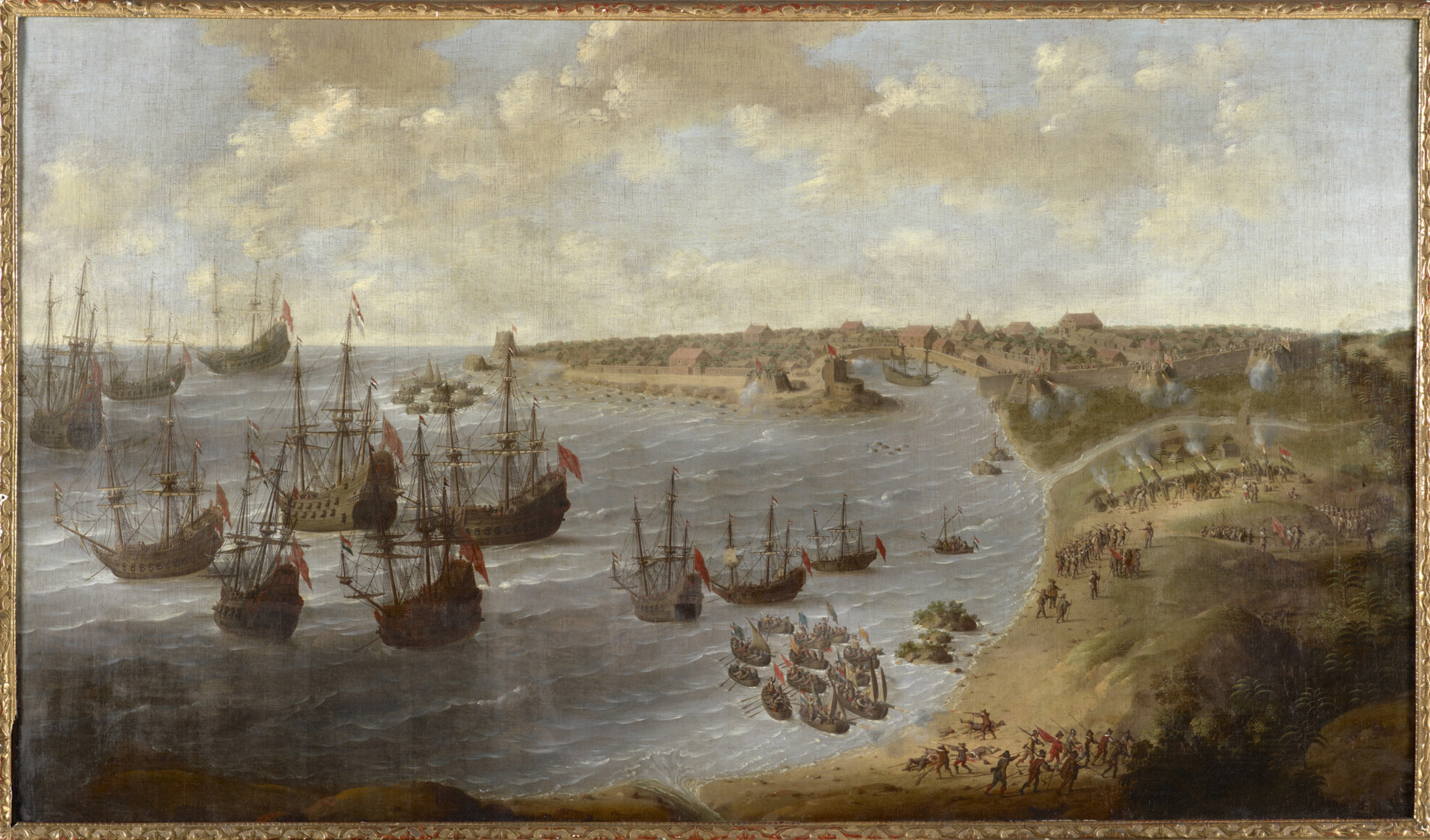
- A Dutch painting depicting the siege
| Date | 8–13 March 1640 |
| Location | Portuguese Fort Santa Cruz de Gale, Galle |
| Result | Dutch–Kandyan victory |

Belligerents
| Dutch East India Company; Kingdom of Kandy | Portuguese Empire; Lascarins (Note: local soldiers on the Portuguese side) |

Commanders and leaders
| (Dutch West India Company) Willem Jacobszoon Coster (Dutch West India Company) Adrian Cornelio; Rajasinghe II | Lourenço Ferreira de Brito; Francisco de Mendonça Manuel † |

Strength
| Total strength; 3,350 European troops; Unknown number of sailors, Bandanese and Malay troops.; Unknown number of Kandyans; 24 ships; at least 27 shallops | Garrison of the Fort; 80 Casados, 30 militia, 3 companies of Topasses; 300 Lascarins; Reinforcements; 400 regulars (soldados), small number of Casados; 1,900 Lascarins, 200 Canarese musketmen, 180 Kaffir archers |

Casualties and losses
| 450 European troops were killed (estimates range up to 1,350), A large number were wounded Casualties to non-European troops are not known | 170 Portuguese were killed, 700 soldiers and civilians were captured Casualties to non-Portuguese troops are not known |

The Siege of the Portuguese fort Santa Cruz de Gale at Galle in 1640, took place during the Dutch–Portuguese and Sinhalese–Portuguese Wars. The Galle fort commanded 282 villages, which contained the most fertile cinnamon lands in southern Sri Lanka It was also an important strategic coastal defense of Portuguese Ceylon. The Dutch, who were in an alliance with the Kingdom of Kandy, landed an expeditionary force under Commodore Willem Jacobszoon Coster of Akersloot, at the Bay of Galle, on 8 March 1640. After bombarding the fort for four consecutive days, Dutch troops stormed the fort and secured a victory on 13 March 1640. The Portuguese garrison, led by Captain Lourenço Ferreira de Brito, mounted a stiff resistance and unexpectedly high casualty rates among Dutch troops gave rise to the proverb "Gold in Malacca, lead in Galle". (Note: Also translated as "In Malacca much gold, in Galle much shot", or "much lead".) With this victory the Dutch gained access to a large port which they later used as a convenient naval base to attack Goa and other South Indian Portuguese defenses. They also gained access to the Sri Lankan cinnamon trade and gained a permanent foothold on the island.

== Background ==
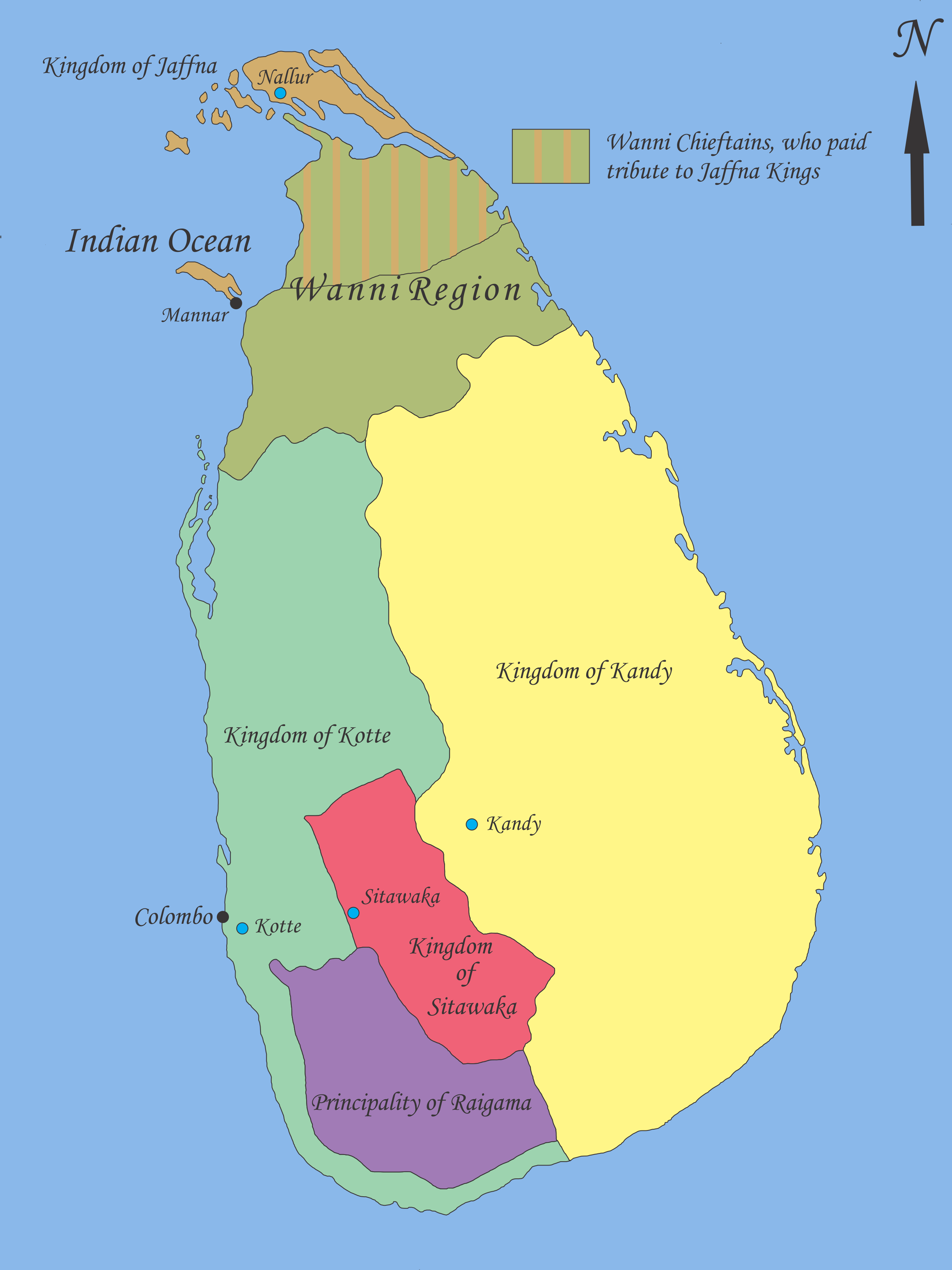
Political map of Sri Lanka soon after the Spoiling of Vijayabahu in 1521. In 1538, Sitawaka annexed the Kingdom of Raigama.

The Portuguese arrived in Sri Lanka in 1505 and established trade relations with the Kingdom of Kotte. They erected a fortress in Colombo and garrisoned it. In 1521, during events which became known as the "Spoiling of Vijayabahu", Kotte King Vijayabahu VII's three sons mutinied and killed their father. They divided the kingdom among themselves giving rise to three minor kingdoms: Kotte, Sitawaka, and Kingdom of Raigama. Subsequent rivalries among these kingdoms gave the Portuguese an opportunity to get involved in internal politics. In 1557, the Kingdom of Kotte became a vassal state of Portugal. In 1591, the Jaffna Kingdom was subjugated and in 1594, Sitawaka was annexed to Portuguese territory. By April 1594, only the Kingdom of Kandy stood in the way of the Portuguese completing their conquest of Sri Lanka.

The Portuguese invaded the Kingdom of Kandy in 1594, 1602, and 1630, but they were defeated on all three occasions by the Kandyans. Meanwhile, after 1602, Dutch envoys began visiting Kandy, and by 1638 negotiations were taking place for a Dutch–Kandyan alliance. A Portuguese army, led by Diogo de Melo de Castro, then invaded Kandy in order to capture it before an alliance could take place. However, the Portuguese army was annihilated on 28 March 1638 in a decisive battle at Gannoruwa. Meanwhile, the Dutch fleet arrived in Sri Lanka on 2 April 1638 and made contact with the Kandyans. Priority was given to capture the Batticaloa and Trincomalee forts. These forts were situated within Kandyan territory and had been built ten years earlier by the Portuguese in violation of the peace treaty that had then existed between the Portuguese and Kandyans.

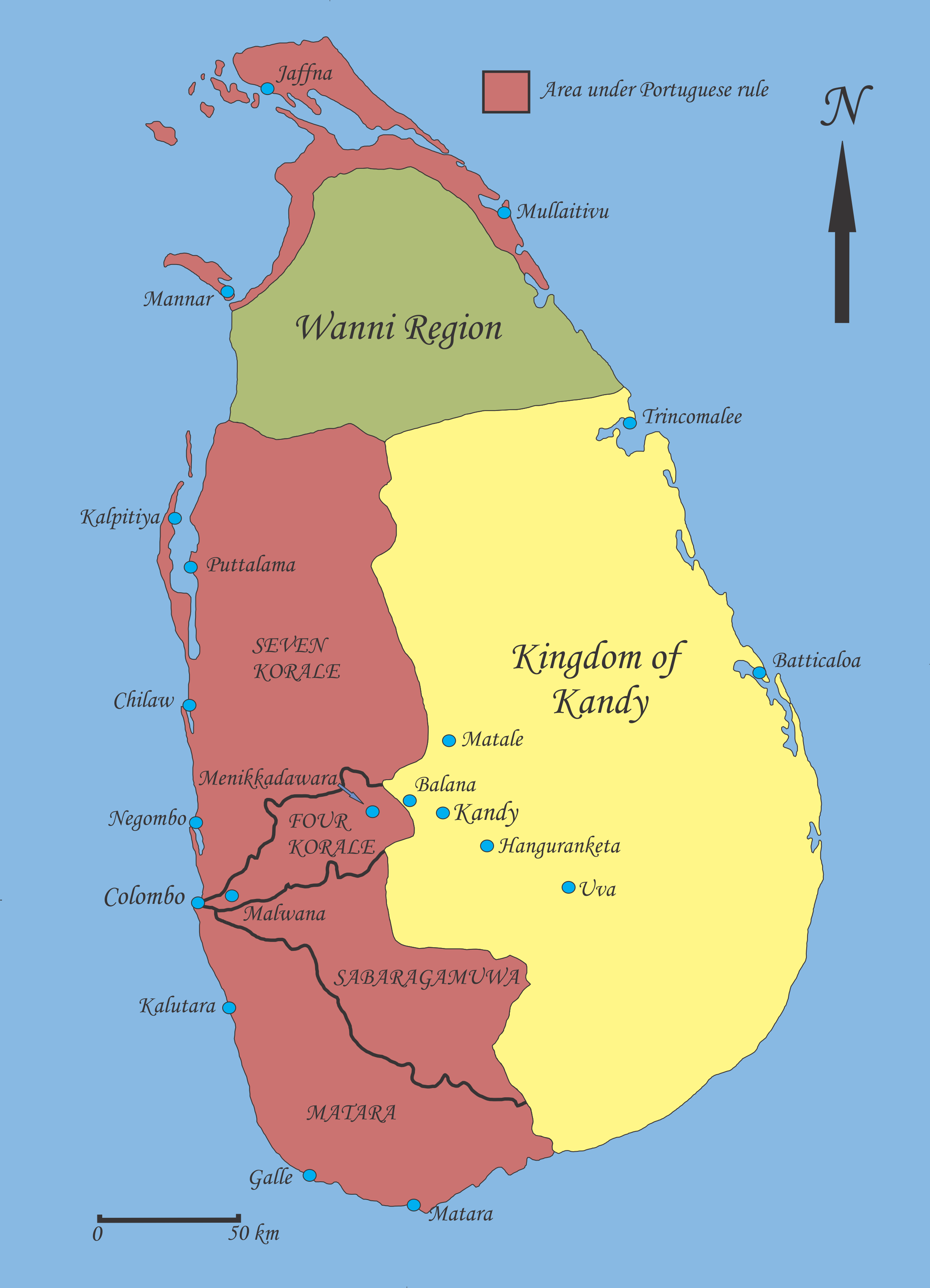
De jure political map of Sri Lanka, early 17th century

On 18 May, after being besieged for eight days by a combined Dutch-Kandyan army, the Portuguese commander surrendered the Batticaloa fort. Five days later, on 23 May 1638, a treaty was signed establishing an alliance between the Dutch and the Kandyans. On 2 May 1639, after a siege that lasted for 40 days, the Dutch captured the Trincomalee fort and on 9 February 1640, a combined Dutch–Kandyan army stormed and captured the Negombo fort. By the end of February, preparations were being made for the siege of Galle.

Goa, the headquarters of Portugal's Asian territories (Estado da Índia), was resupplied annually from Lisbon by Portugal's India armadas. These resources were later distributed to the other Portuguese strongholds through further supply convoys and Sri Lanka received supplies and reinforcements twice a year in May and September. However, whenever a Portuguese stronghold was under threat, reinforcements were rushed to that place disregarding the normal procedures of supply.

In 1636, Antonio van Diemen was appointed Governor General of Dutch East India Company. Under his leadership Dutch naval strategy underwent an important change. From 1636, van Diemen annually sent a fleet to blockade Goa, using this opportunity to attack other Portuguese processions as they were deprived of help. He used this strategy in Sri Lanka and after the destruction of powerful Portuguese galleons in the battle of Mormugão on 30 September 1639, the Dutch were able to divert more ships and men to Sri Lanka. On 14 March 1639, issuing a statement, van Diemen declared that the time had come to drive the Portuguese out of their strongholds and to secure Dutch supremacy in the Indies.

== Opposing forces and the Galle fort ==
=== Portuguese army ===
Every year an eastbound fleet from Lisbon to Goa brought volunteers, convicts, and men forced into service by periodic sweeps of the streets, as recruits. After a short period of basic training, which included parade ground drilling and fighting in formations, they were distributed throughout the empire. Sometimes these raw recruits received their formal military training on the battlefield itself.

The rank and file was composed of unmarried regular soldiers who were known as "soldados". They were arranged into companies of 30 to 35 men under a captain with an ensign and a sergeant as non-commissioned officers. These regulars were supported by other various fighting elements. "Casados" were retired veterans who had married and settled locally. In special situations like in expeditions and sieges, they were recalled for active duty. Indigenous fighting men who served under the Portuguese were known as "Lascarins". They fought under their provincial leader, a "Dissawe", who was invariably a Portuguese (by 1640 there were four provinces under the Portuguese rule: Seven Korale, Four Korale, Matara, and Sabaragamuwa). They also hired mercenary soldiers from south India and employed African soldiers to further increase their numbers.

The primary firearm used by the Portuguese was arquebus, while spears and swords with shields were used as the primary melee weapons. Comparing the arquebus with the Dutch muskets, Portuguese author Queiroz wrote "... arquebues, do not do as much damage as theirs [Dutch] from muskets, on yet account of the greater expedition with which our men wielded them, they made up for the greater damage of the musketry." Portuguese troops in Ceylon did not wear any armor and some of the rank and file even fought barefoot.

=== Dutch army ===
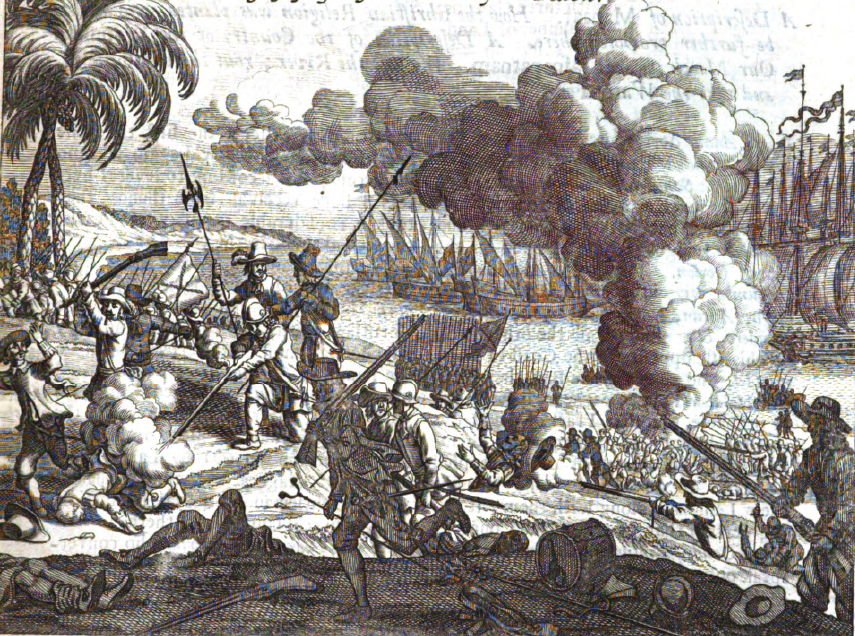
Dutch troops during the battle of Mannar (1658). Note their weapons and armor.

Although called "the Hollanders" by the contemporary sources the VOC army consisted of any European that could be recruited resulting in a multi-ethnic army. Apart from the Dutch, there were also German, English, Scottish, Irish, and French troops on the field. In contrast to the Portuguese troops in Ceylon, the Dutch army used similar tactics to other contemporary European armies, which formed in tight blocks of pike-men and musketeers. They were arranged into companies of 100 men and supported by auxiliary troops that consisted of Javanese and Malays. These Malay troops were organized under their own chiefs with little effort to provide proper military training or up to date weapons.

Unlike the Portuguese, Dutch troops wore armor, which consisted of breastplates and morions. Their primary weapons were matchlock muskets, pikes, and spears, but Queiroz states that the Dutch used flintlock muskets in addition to matchlocks during the siege. Additionally, describing the Dutch troops who fought in Galle, he wrote that “... the Batavian brought on this occasion great leaders, picked and well armed men.”

=== Santa Cruz de Gale ===
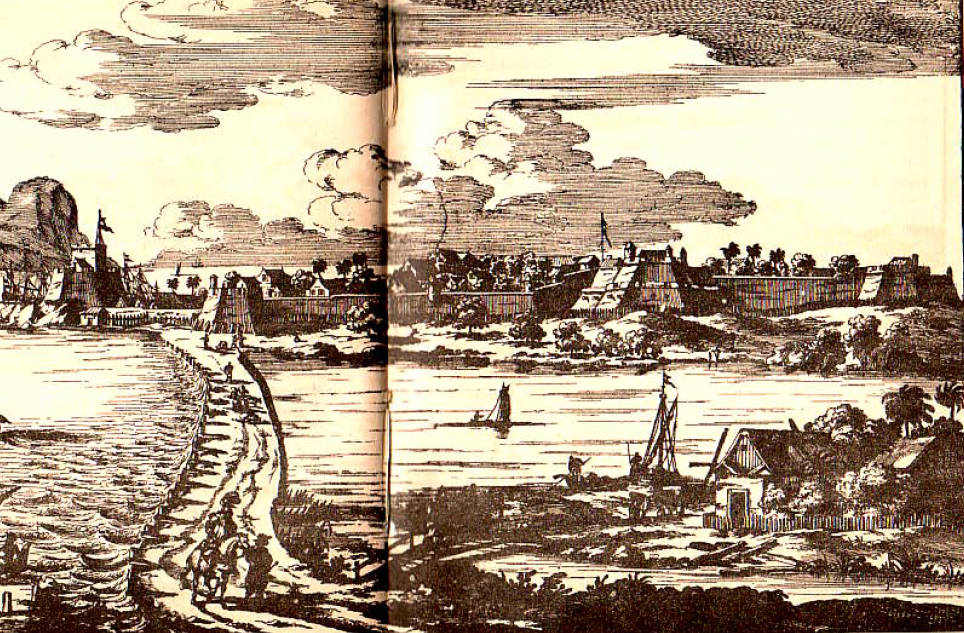
Gall Fort between 1640 and 1667, as seen from the bazaar. The fortification to the far left is the "Retreat" which contained the Captains keep and an esplanade. The three bastions from left to right are Santiago, Conception, and Santo António.

The Portuguese fort of Santa Cruz de Gale was situated on a promontory at the western edge of the Bay of Galle. Although considerably elevated at its southern tip, it gradually sloped down towards the isthmus where it connected with the mainland. At this isthmus, a wall extended from sea side to the bay side enclosing Galle city. There were three bastions defending the wall from sea to bay called "Santo António", "Conception", and "Santiago". Santiago was small and had a low open terrace making it vulnerable to grenade attacks. From the Santiago, a parapet wall ran along the bay up to the Retreat, a fortification that contained the captain's keep and an esplanade, which had space to mount 20 guns.

At the southern tip of the fort, the Bastion of Santa Cruz commanded the western approaches to the bay. However, at the time of the siege, it lacked any guns and its walls were in ruins. The Galle fort, which was surrounded by sea on three sides, could be entered from the north side through two gates. Porta da Traição, or the Treason Gate, was the main gate. It was protected by a cavalier and was situated where the present-day gate is situated. At the foot of the Bastion of Santiago, there was another gate called Porta do Muro or the Wall Gate, which the Dutch called the “gate of the chief bastion”. There were two more entry points at the bay side, which granted access to the harbor.

The Galle fort was secured at the western side by a reef and hidden rocks. Although an enemy party could have landed over the rocks around the fort in favorable weather, this approach was considered secure. The bastion of Santa Cruz defended the southern side, while breastworks with twelve “field pieces” defended the eastern side, which was approachable from the Galle bay. Despite its strengths, the Galle fort had an inherent weakness. Within cannon range from the northern wall there was an area of higher ground from which a battery, if established there, had the ability to fire grenades over the wall into the fort.

== Prelude ==
=== Planning and preparation ===
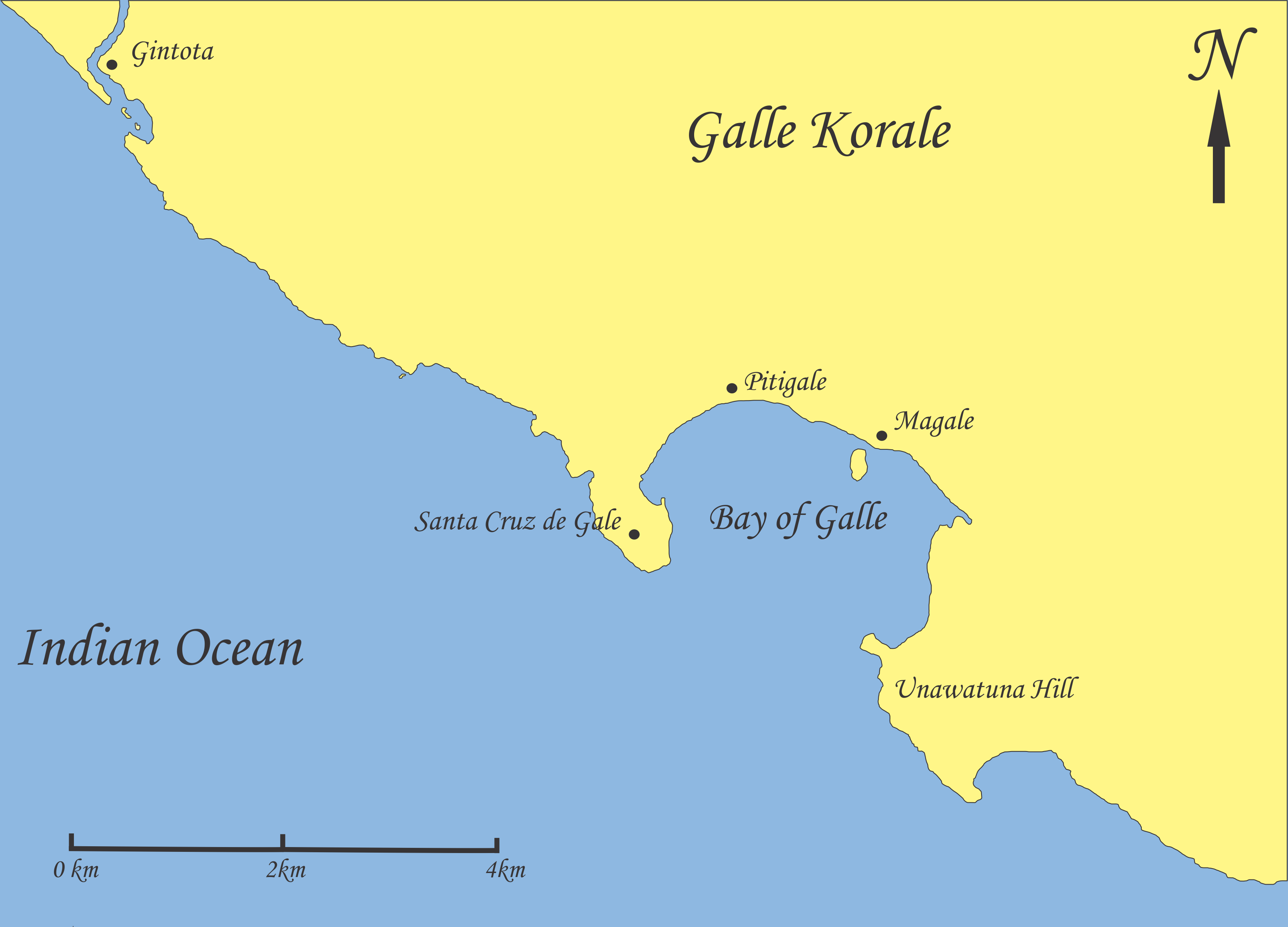
Bay of Galle and environ. Dutch troops chose Magale, which was situated beyond the range of the fort guns as their landing site. The high ground was located between the fort and Pitigale.

The mastermind behind the siege was Commodore Willem Jacobszoon Coster, second-in-command of the Dutch expeditionary force to Sri Lanka. The Dutch had been gathering information on Galle and on 14 June 1638, writing to Governor General Van Diemen, Coster outlined his plan of attack. He described his plans to land troops beyond the range of the fort guns to exploit the Galle fort's inherent weakness, “... there is a highland like the promontory, so that one can easily fire with guns from there at the city and the principal fort, and, as far as we can gather, can throw (grenades) with mortars, and we shall obliged to take it in this manner.” Van Diemen, writing back on 11 August 1638, ordered that Galle was a priority target and to capture it before Colombo. He further added “... it [Galle] offers an excellent harbor for vessels which can anchor there at any time of the year”, which better suited their future plans.

As per instructions given by Van Diemen, a fleet of 11 ships approached Galle in December 1638. Their plan was to assess the Portuguese fortifications and locate potential landing sites. After a failed attempt due to heavy rains and rough seas, they landed a small detachment the next day while the ships distracted the fort with a bombardment. They inspected the area and successfully completed the mission at the expense of three soldiers who were killed in action and another soldier who was injured. However, the Dutch council wanted additional information and instructed Coster, “if Portuguese of position are taken prisoner get them to confess by good or bad means.”

In July 1639, a fleet of nine ships was sent to blockade Goa. Their objective was to prevent any reinforcements from reaching Sri Lanka. On 24 September 1639, a Dutch expeditionary force, under the command of director Philip Lucasz, left Batavia. Meanwhile, on 24 October 1639, two Dutch ships appeared off Colombo and attacked Portuguese vessels there, disrupting their shipping along the west coast. After being delayed by several weeks due to storms, Philip Lucasz arrived in December 1639 with a force of 21 ships. They landed north of Negombo and defeated the Portuguese during the battle of Kammala. Later, together with a 15,000-strong Kandyan army, they captured Negombo. After the battle, Lucasz fell critically ill and died on his way back to Batavia leaving Coster in command of the Dutch expeditionary force.

The Portuguese were unprepared for a siege. João Rodrigues Leitão, the captain of the Galle fort, was severely ill. He was succeeded by a Casado Captain, Lourenço Ferreira de Brito, just 28 days before the arrival of the Dutch. He had only 80 Casados, 30 militia, three companies of Topasses, and 300 Lascarins for the defense. The armory only contained a small stock of gunpowder, 20 muskets and arquebuses, and a few spears. In addition to the field pieces along the breastwork, he had only 12 guns, two stone mortars, and seven falcons. The guns were of different calibers (Note: Two 20 pound guns, one of 18, one of 16, one of 14, four of 12 and three 6-pound guns.) so they required shots of different sizes. The treasury was empty so he had to collect money from the inhabitants to pay for munitions and repairs.

=== Movement to battle ===
At the beginning of March, Portuguese Generals Manuel Mascarenhas Homem and Dom Brás de Castro left from Cochin, with a strong force of reinforcements in eight ships and 15 galleys. Five hundred Christians led by Cristóvão Teles, a Knight of the order of Christ, joined them bearing the zeal of bishop of Cochin. This large force came to be known as “the two Generals” and was eagerly expected at Colombo.

On 1 March 1640, a fleet of five Dutch ships appeared off Colombo. They anchored opposite the fort, convincing the Portuguese of an imminent attack. On 5 March, a second fleet arrived from the direction of Negombo and after joining they sailed south. As soon as the ships set out, the Captain General D. António Mascarenhas, the Governor of Portuguese Ceylon, realized that they were heading for Galle. He hastily organized a relief force under Captain Major Francisco de Mendonça Manuel. It consisted of 323 Portuguese in 12 companies, 1,600 Lascarins under the four Dissawes, 200 Canarese musket men (under their leader Rana), and 100 Kaffir archers.

Portuguese reinforcements forced marched along the coast, crossing three major rivers by boats. They did not encounter any Kandyan troops and advanced without encountering resistance. However, by the time they reached Aluthgama, Mendonça realized that he would not be able to reach Galle in time. So he sent Francisco Antunes, the Dissawe of Matara, in advance with a detachment of Lascarins from the Korale of Galle. They managed to reach Galle on the morning of 8 March 1640, just before the arrival of the Dutch.

== Early encounters ==
=== Dutch landing ===
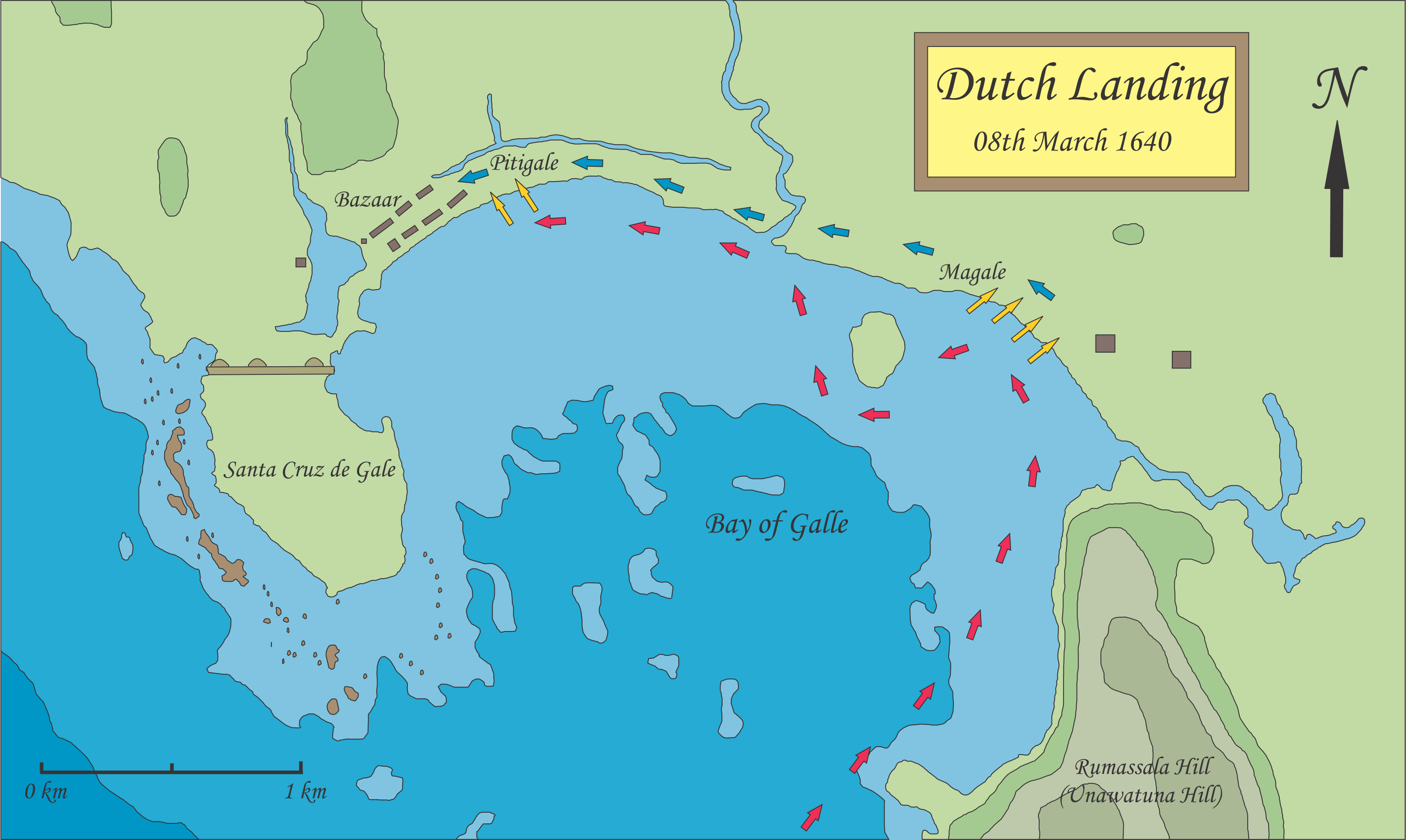
The Dutch landing sites. Red arrows show the route taken by the launches while the blue arrows show the advance of Dutch infantry. Launches landed the troops at Magale and unloaded the siege artillery at Pitigale.

By midday on the 8th, the Dutch fleet appeared off the coast of Galle. They arranged themselves in battle formation and saluted the fort with a salvo. Once the fort replied, six Dutch ships continued the bombardment while a landing party consisting of two pinnaces, a shallop, and 17 launches entered the bay.

They maneuvered close to the Unavatuna hill (Rumassala hill), staying beyond the range of the fort guns. The two pinnaces and the shallop moored at the edge of the bay and continued to bombard the shore and the nearby woods. The launches advanced along the shore and approached the wide stretch of beach beyond Magale, which had been chosen for the landing. Under the cover of the artillery fire, they disembarked 700 European musketeers and 400 Malay and Bandanese troops in two waves. These troops were under the command of Commodore Willem Jacobz Coster. They rapidly arranged themselves into three columns and began to march towards Pitigale. Natives from the area informed them about the relief force of "350 white men” that was expected by the Portuguese garrison, but Coster decided to continue to Pitigale as planned.

When the launches approached the bay, Captain Lourenço Ferreira de Brito (commander of the Galle fort) sent a force under Francisco Antunes to open up trenches at Magale to check the landing of the Dutch. This force consisted of three companies from the garrison and the Lascarins who came with him in the morning. However, the Dutch were efficient in their landing and the Portuguese had to advance along the curve of the bay. By the time they reached there, the Dutch were in battle formation and had deployed cannons.

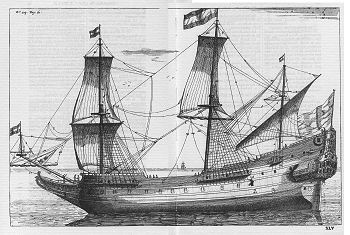
A 17th-century Dutch pinnace.

The vanguard of the Dutch force engaged them and the Portuguese withdrew while fighting. During this skirmish some of the Portuguese soldiers were taken as prisoners but the rest managed to disengage and retreat towards Gintota, where they met Francisco de Mendonça Manuel with the rest of the relief force. Dutch troops then advanced towards Pitigale accompanied by launches, which sailed along the edge of the bay. They were laden with artillery, which was intended to be used during the siege. The fort's guns concentrated their fire on these launches. A shot from the cavalier over the main gate (commanded by Vicente Pais de Mendonça) managed to sink a launch loaded with an artillery piece. But despite their continuous bombardment, the Dutch took quarters in the bazaar and the high ground next to it while the launches unloaded the artillery at Pitigale.

=== Night of 8 March ===
At nightfall, a Dutch pinnace made a probe from the direction of the bay. It was assessing the defenses and approached the eastern side of the fort in front of the breastworks. Portuguese guns opened fire and after several shots they managed to score a direct hit. The pinnace lost its mizzen mast and was forced to retire. Thereafter, Dutch ships did not approach the fort from that direction.

Under the cover of darkness, Dutch troops built a sand rampart to fortify the approaches to the bazaar. They built a stockade over the high ground and opened up trenches to defend the positions. Thorn bushes were placed in front of them as entanglements to prevent direct charges, and the Dutch mounted two 30-pound guns on the high ground, directing them at the bastion of Santiago. Five lesser caliber cannons were placed along the line to guard the fortifications. Meanwhile, launches continued to land troops, raising the strength of the Dutch force.

In the night, a Portuguese force under Captain Manuel Brás arrived from Matara and managed to enter the fort undetected. They brought three companies of Soldados with some Casados, 80 Kaffirs, and 300 lascarins. In the meantime, Captain Major Mendonça established communications with the fort and decided to attack the enemy position the following morning. A three-pronged attack was planned and Portuguese spies observed that the Dutch were arranged in two bodies.

The first party, or the right wing, consisted of the troops that had arrived in the night from Matara. Three companies of regulars (soldados) with some casados, 80 Kaffirs, and 300 Lascarins were in this party under the command of Vicente da Silva. They were expected to attack the rampart defending the bazaar. The left wing was commanded by Captain Major Mendonça himself. His force consisted of eight companies of regulars, 200 Canarese musket men and Lascarins under Francisco Antunes (Dissawe of Matara) and Francisco da Silva (Dissawe of Seven Korale). They were to attack the trenches and the battery mounted on high ground.

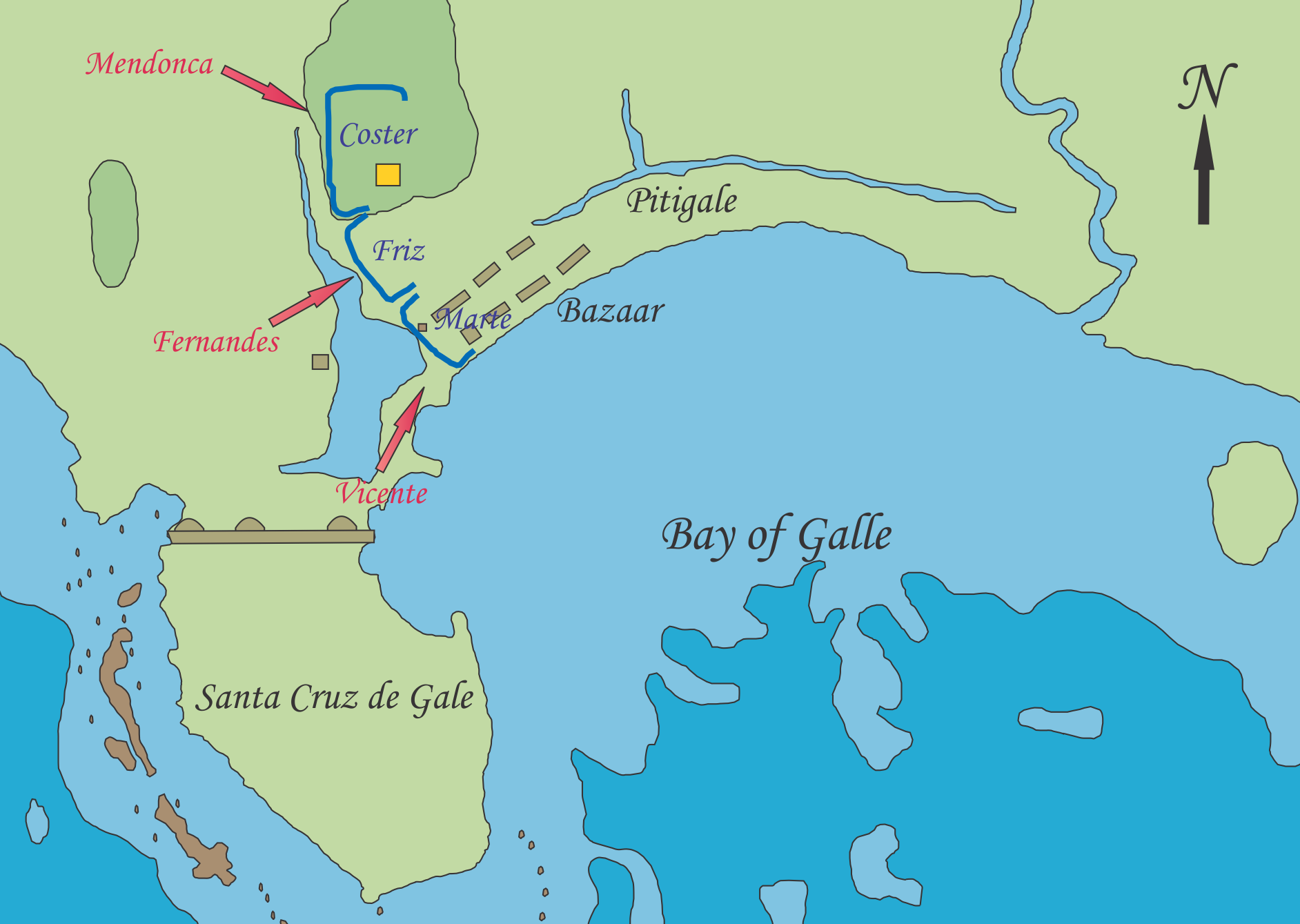
The Portuguese attack on the Dutch position.

In the center, four companies of regulars with Lascarins under António de Fonseca Pereira (Dissawe of Four Korale) and Francisco de Faria (Dissawe of Sabaragamuwa) were to attack the inland portion of the rampart. They were under the command of Captain Jorge Fernandes. According to the plan all three wings would mount a simultaneous attack on the Dutch line at daybreak, acting on a signal given by a gun from the fort. The Portuguese troops silently approached the Dutch line and halted beyond a distance of two muskets shots. They spent the rest of the night there preparing themselves for the assault.

After the landing, the Dutch paid the natives to spy on the Portuguese and to provide information on their movements. As a result, they discovered the Portuguese attack plans. The Dutch redeployed their men into three bodies to receive each attack. Captain Marte with 200 Dutch and 100 Bandanese occupied the rampart where Vicente were to attack. Three hundred Dutch and 100 Bandanese under Captain Friz occupied the inland portion of the rampart. Eight hundred European musketmen, with an unknown number of Bandanese, occupied the trenches on the high ground under the command of Commodore Willem Jacobz Coster and Master of the Field Andriao Cornelio.

Before daybreak, Mendonça addressed his men. To counter the odds of the large number of European troops, he encouraged them to fight in close quarters while maintaining their formations. (Note: You all know that, by the same action and valour, we serve two very different masters [Viz.] God, by fighting for the faith against heretics, and the King, through loyalty to whom, we battle with his enemies. I cannot deny that they are more in number that they are Europeans, and well billeted, dexterous in arms, with picked leaders; but it is no novelty for Portuguese to vanquish any other nation with lesser forces, and in India especially we have not yet lost that distinction. We do not generally use European discipline in Asia against the natives, but with Europeans we must needs observe them, and by fighting good order this day we shall find support for victory, a refuge for rest, and whatever be our fortune in battle, a sure shelter, so that we may try the advantage which a pitched battle can give us if we fight wisely and it is in our power to follow up the victory which we hope from our God, or to forestall the destruction, if our fate be different..... It is well known that none of those here present will refuse to fight with sword and spear against five or six of them in a street, and the inequality does not become greater, if we come to vie hand to hand; and if on the strength of their good fortune they show themselves cavaliers, their defiance will stop here. In the Portuguese fashion let us attack the face to face; let us meet them breast to breast, and always in good order, and I shall be answerable for the victory.”) After the speech they advanced to within musket range of the Dutch line and silently waited for the signal from the fort.

=== Battle for the bazaar and the stockade – 9 March ===
At daybreak, the signal was given from the fort and all three Portuguese forces assaulted the Dutch position. On the right flank, Vicente attacked along the coast. When the Dutch fired a cannon volley, almost all the Kaffirs and some of the Lascarins abandoned the fight and ran back. The rest of them continued the charge and captured the rampart with two cannons. The Dutch captain, Marte, was killed in this battle and his units withdrew towards the beach. Some of them were heading for the three launches that were tied up on the beach, but the Portuguese reached them first and cast them adrift, preventing the Dutch from escaping. After receiving reinforcements, Dutch troops reorganized and counterattacked the rampart now held by Portuguese. Although the Portuguese held their position, they suffered many casualties including two of their captains and two ensigns. Gradually the Dutch gained the upper hand and Portuguese forces started to withdraw. The commander of Galle, Lourenço Ferreira de Brito, observed the situation from the fort and came to their aid with a detachment under Bartolomeu d'Eça. With fresh troops the Portuguese regained the rampart while Lourenço Ferreira retired back to the fort with the wounded.

In the center, the Portuguese met with heavy resistance. Francisco de Faria (the Dissawe of Sabaragamuwa) was killed and his lascarins fled from the field. The rest of the troops continued to attack and both sides suffered many casualties without gaining a significant advantage. On the left flank, Mendonça attacked the trenches. His men charged the battery several times and after fighting for more than one and a half hours, Mendonça managed to dislodge the Dutch from the high ground. He captured the two artillery pieces with two cannons.

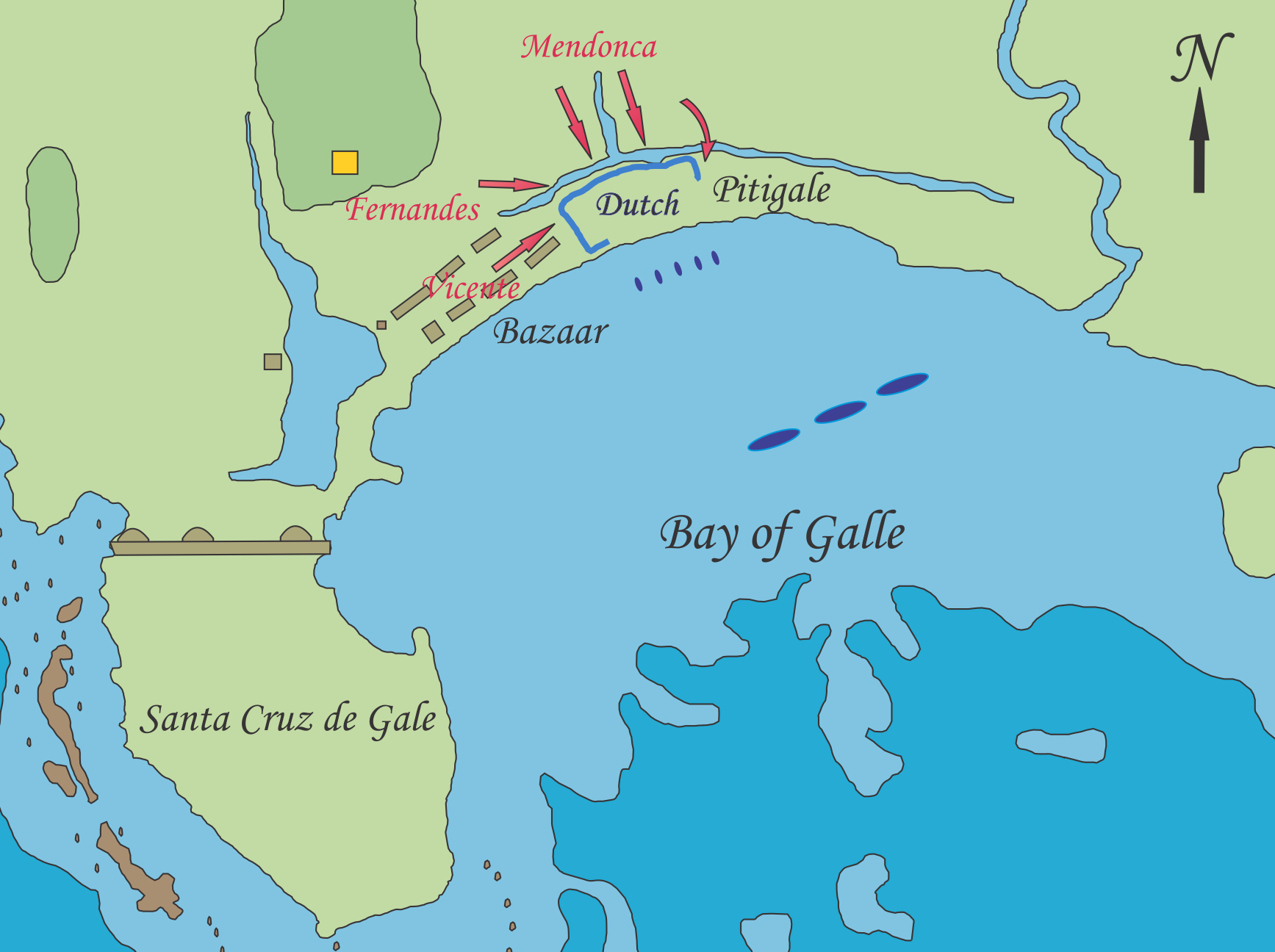
The final phase of the Portuguese attack on the Dutch position.

Soon the Dutch line collapsed and defenders were driven out of the bazaar. They began to reform into a single large squadron in a palm grove, but Portuguese troops charged into the midst of the Dutch. They were taken by surprise and according to Portuguese sources the Dutch troops could not discharge even a single volley towards the Portuguese. To secure a victory, Mendonça sent his Ensign Major, Valentim Pinheiro, with four companies in a flanking maneuver to attack them in the rear.

This tactic worked and the Dutch, with their ranks broken, fled towards the sea. In this narrow stretch of open beach, the Dutch suffered a large number of casualties and many threw themselves into the sea. Dutch ships fired volleys of artillery at Portuguese forces. Shallops and 35 launches came to the aid of the Dutch troops with reserve forces, officers, and ammunition. They picked up men from the sea preventing them from drowning. Shallops continued to fire at Portuguese soldiers with muskets and cannons.

A Portuguese captain major, armed with a sword and a shield, strode up and down on the shore encouraging his men to continuously press the attack. He ordered them to fire even on the shallops to prevent them from assisting the Dutch troops. The remaining Dutch troops raised a white flag realizing that they were stranded. At the same time, a cannonball from a shallop hit Mendonça on his head and killed him instantly. Suddenly, Portuguese troops found themselves leaderless and without direction. A sergeant major who was next in command stood irresolute, while the Portuguese attack halted. In panic they abandoned the fight and retired back to the fort in scattered groups. Some of the wounded (Captain Jorge Fernandes the commander of the center, Captain João de Sequeira and four soldiers) were left behind and they were taken prisoner by the Dutch.

=== Impact of the battle ===
Seventy Portuguese soldiers were killed in the battle. (Note: "about sixty", according to the Dutch sources) Another seventy were injured but managed to retreat back to the fort. A few wounded were taken as prisoners. Casualties suffered by Lascarins, Canarese musketmen, and Kaffir archers are not known.

Although the Dutch casualty figures are in dispute, both Portuguese and Dutch sources agree that they suffered heavy casualties. Dutch writer Phillipus Baldaeus stated that the fighting "caused us no small loss in killed and wounded" and Portuguese writer Fernão de Queiroz gives a figure of 900 killed and a proportionate number of wounded. Captain Ribeiro, who served in Sri Lanka from 1640 to 1658 and personally met the battle participants, stated that Dutch lost "more than four hundred men". Official Dutch records give an indirect figure; "the arrival of 350 men two days later was regarded as a welcome reinforcement to bring the army up to its original strength".

Although less in number, Portuguese losses had a greater impact as they lost many officers and veterans. (Note: Captain Major Francisco de Mendonça Manuel, Captain André Monteiro (commander of the advanced guard), Francisco de Faria (Dissawe of Sabaragamuwa), and Captains Francisco da Silva and Francisco Valadas, and many ensigns and sergeants were among the dead. Captain Sebastião d'Orta, commander of Kalutara Fort, and Captains Francisco de Menezes and Manuel Fernandes Madeira were also wounded and out of action. Captain Jorge Fernandes, the commander of the center, and Captain João de Sequeira were taken as prisoners by the Dutch.) Portuguese writer Queiroz criticizes their commander's decision to attack a well entrenched enemy position. He suggests that if they had retired to the fort to reinforce the garrison without engaging the Dutch, "It would have been impossible for the Hollander to take that Praça".

On the other hand, the Dutch rapidly regained their positions. They mounted six large caliber guns on the high ground and many lesser caliber cannons for their defense. Soon they recommenced the bombardment now targeting bastions of Santiago and Conception. However, due to the large number of wounded they suffered from a shortage of men until the arrival of reinforcements on the 11th.

=== Night on 9 March ===
The Dutch bombardment was answered from the three bastions and the Portuguese brought up some artillery which was mounted on the sea side in order to increase their fire power. Most of the Portuguese gunners were veterans who used to serve in galleons and they laid down an accurate fire disregarding the mounting casualties, but despite their efforts the Dutch managed to maintain a steady barrage.

During the night of the 9th, the captain of the fort, Lourenço Ferreira de Brito, called a meeting with the council and the remaining commanders of the reinforcements. He outlined the state of the fort, its strengths, weaknesses, the effect of the Dutch bombardment, and his plans to lead another attack to capture and spike the Dutch guns. But only three out of fifteen supported his suggestion and they decided to keep the remaining forces intact to hold the fort until reinforcements could arrive from Goa. They decided to send Sebastião d’Orta, the captain of Kalutara fort, to Colombo to negotiate for reinforcements and ammunition as they were running out of 16-, 14-, and 12-pound shots despite the continuous efforts of the blacksmiths who were casting fresh ones. He was sent in a small vessel under the cover of darkness.

By nightfall, the Dutch bombardment had managed to significantly damage the bastion of Santiago. Their shots penetrated the weaker sections of the wall (near the main gate) and entered the fort. The Portuguese, with the help of the inhabitants, began to repair the fortifications. All the palm trees within the fort were cut down and they were laid over the bastion of Santiago and the damaged sections. These repairs were made under continuous cannon fire and their effectiveness was noted even by the Dutch commanders.

== Siege from 10 to 12 March ==
=== Defense plan of Santa Cruz de Gale ===
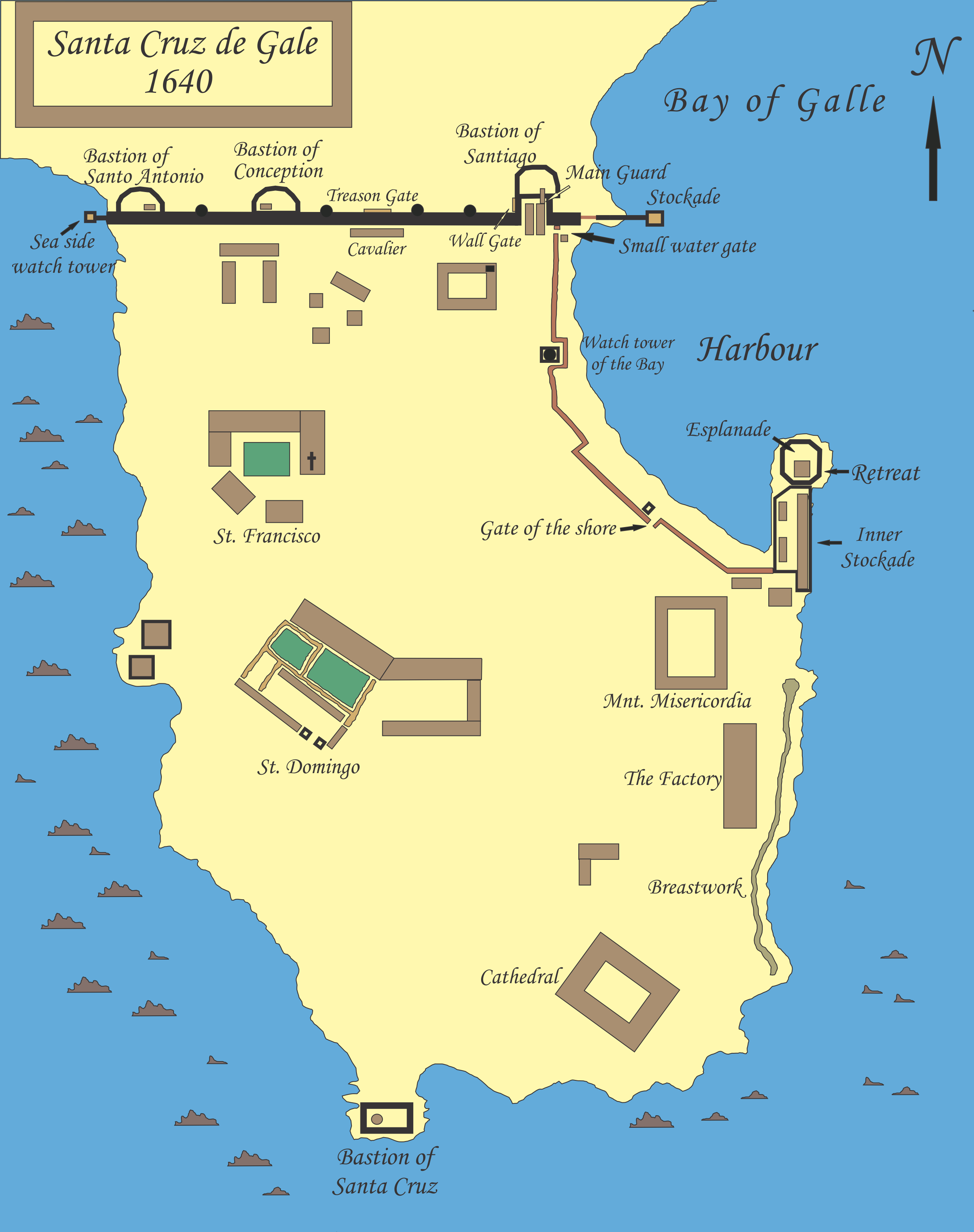
Map of Santa Cruz de Gale (1640)

The Portuguese reorganized their defenses with the remaining regular troops (Soldados). They armed all the inhabitants who could bear arms including the young, old, sick, merchants, and even visitors who happened to be there at the time of the siege. They were arranged into militia groups. The Casados and Topasses were arranged into small squads called "companion groups" and deployed with the regular troops to strengthen the defenses.

The defense of the bastion of Santo António was assigned to 28 regulars under Captain Bartolomeu d'Eça and 14 companions under Casado captain António Lourenço Forte. The bastion of Conception was assigned to a company of 26 regulars under Captain Francisco Gonçalves Velho and a group of 16 companions under Captain Lourenço da Costa, a Casado of Galle. The bastion of Santiago, where the main attack was expected, was assigned to a company of 29 regulars under Ensign Major Valentim Pinheiro and 16 companions under a casado Captain Pedro Carvalho.

The sea side watch tower was occupied by eight companions and the four watch towers along the wall were assigned to four companies of regulars from left to right had 21, 28, 27, and 26 soldados, respectively. In the main guard, a stone mortar and a falcon were mounted. They were manned by five companions and provided a field of fire to cover the approaches to the bastion. The section of the curtain from the bastion of Santo António to the bastion of Conception was assigned to the Dissawe of Seven Korale and his Lascarins. From the Conception to Santiago, the Dissawe of Matara and his lascarins manned the curtain. Near the base of the Bastion Santiago two units of Kaffir archers (total of 80) were stationed as a reserve force.

To defend against a landing from the bay, 25 regulars manned the watch tower of the bay. The inner stockade was defended by 27 regulars, six companions, and by the Lascarins of Dissawe of four Korale. A group of militia took position at the foot of the retreat, among the rocks. They were armed with muskets which were mounted on supports. The retreat was garrisoned by 16 companions and they were also guarding the gunpowder stock. Along the breastworks there were 12 artillery pieces manned by gunners under Manuel de Fonseca Moniz.

The bastion of Santa Cruz was defended by a company of 24 regulars and by the remaining Canareses musketmen under their leader, Rana. From there to the western end of the wall was defended by the newly appointed Dissawe of Sabaragamuwa, Afonso Carvalho, and his Lascarins. They were supported by 12 companions who manned muskets mounted on supports. In addition to these fixed defenses there were three patrol squads. The first patrol consisted of 10 companions under a Casado Captain. The second patrol was commanded by the sergeant major and consisted of 25 regulars, and the third patrol was commanded by Lourenço Ferreira de Brito, the Captain of the Fort, and had 20 companions.

=== Bombardment of the fort ===
On the 10th, the Dutch positioned mortars and began to bombard the town with 60-pound grenades. This bombardment and the subsequent fire damaged a section of the town and destroyed the houses of Lopo da Gama, which was considered as a beautiful zone. In addition to the damage caused, this bombardment with grenades had a major impact on the morale of the non-European troops who had never been on the receiving end of such a barrage.

During the night, the Portuguese concentrated their repairs on the bastions of Conception and Santiago, using palm trunks to cover the damaged sections. Meanwhile, a body of Dutch troops infiltrated and attacked the bastion of Santiago and the men who were engaged in repairs. As the light and smell of a burning match could give away their position, this Dutch infiltration unit used flintlock muskets instead of matchlocks. They managed to wound some men but were forced to withdraw due to a charge made by the Portuguese guards. In retaliation, Lourenço Ferreira de Brito, the captain of the fort, organized a raiding party consisting of Lascarins, but after sallying and arousing the Dutch, they defected to them. Similarly, Dissanayake Mudali, a Lascarin leader, also defected and was seen collaborating with the Dutch.

By the 11th, the Dutch command was in a state of trepidation due to the shortage of men. Although the Kandyan Dissawe of Matara had arrived, the Kandyan offensive units were still beyond Weligama, a town 6 miles (9.7 km) east to the Galle fort. That day, much to the relief of the Dutch command, three ships (Haarlem, Middelburgh, and Breda) arrived from Goa bringing 350 soldiers and 50 sailors as reinforcements. They were disembarked immediately and ordered to take the field with rest of the troops.

=== Order of "no quarter" ===
By the 12th, the Dutch bombardment managed to considerably weaken the Bastion of Santiago, convincing the Dutch commanders that an assault on Santa Cruz de Gale was now possible. On the same day at noon a Dutch messenger arrived at the bastion of Santiago carrying a white flag and a drum. He was accompanied by João Festa, who was the Portuguese Captain of Batecaloa Fort. But they were refused a hearing and even fired upon as had happened during the siege of Trincomalee. Although the Dutch envoy managed to get back unharmed, Portuguese sources claim that the Dutch issued a "no quarter" order in retaliation to the insult. A Dutch commander later wrote "...and conquered, killing everyone who was found armed". Portuguese writer Queiroz gives a possible explanation for their breach of accepted norms,

... either because they remained longer than was necessary, or because all do not know the courtesies of war, one of the Captains of the bastion of Sant-Iago ordered [his men] to fire muskets on them, and he was reprimand for it, though he had not been fully obeyed, because those who fired did not want to kill them; and being called by their companions they returned. The enemy, who found himself strong enough for anything, took occasion by this insult to refuse quarter thenceforth ...

Later that day, the Dutch war council gathered on board of their flagship Utrecht. In a controversial move, Commodore Willem Coster proposed to storm the fort in the early morning of the 13th without waiting for the arrival of Kandyan offensive units. According to the prior agreements with Kandyan Mudalis, they were expected on the 13th to attack the fort on a later hour. The original Dutch order signed by Coster himself, state the reasons for this premature attack,

... Where as since 9th we have been bombarding the town and fortifications of Sta. Cruz de Gale, and the enemy are nightly filling up with palm trees and osier-work the breaches made by us in the day-time, with out our being able to prevent them from doing so, and as it is greatly feared that the besieged will find means to strengthen themselves more and more on those points where they have expect our attacks, therefore ...

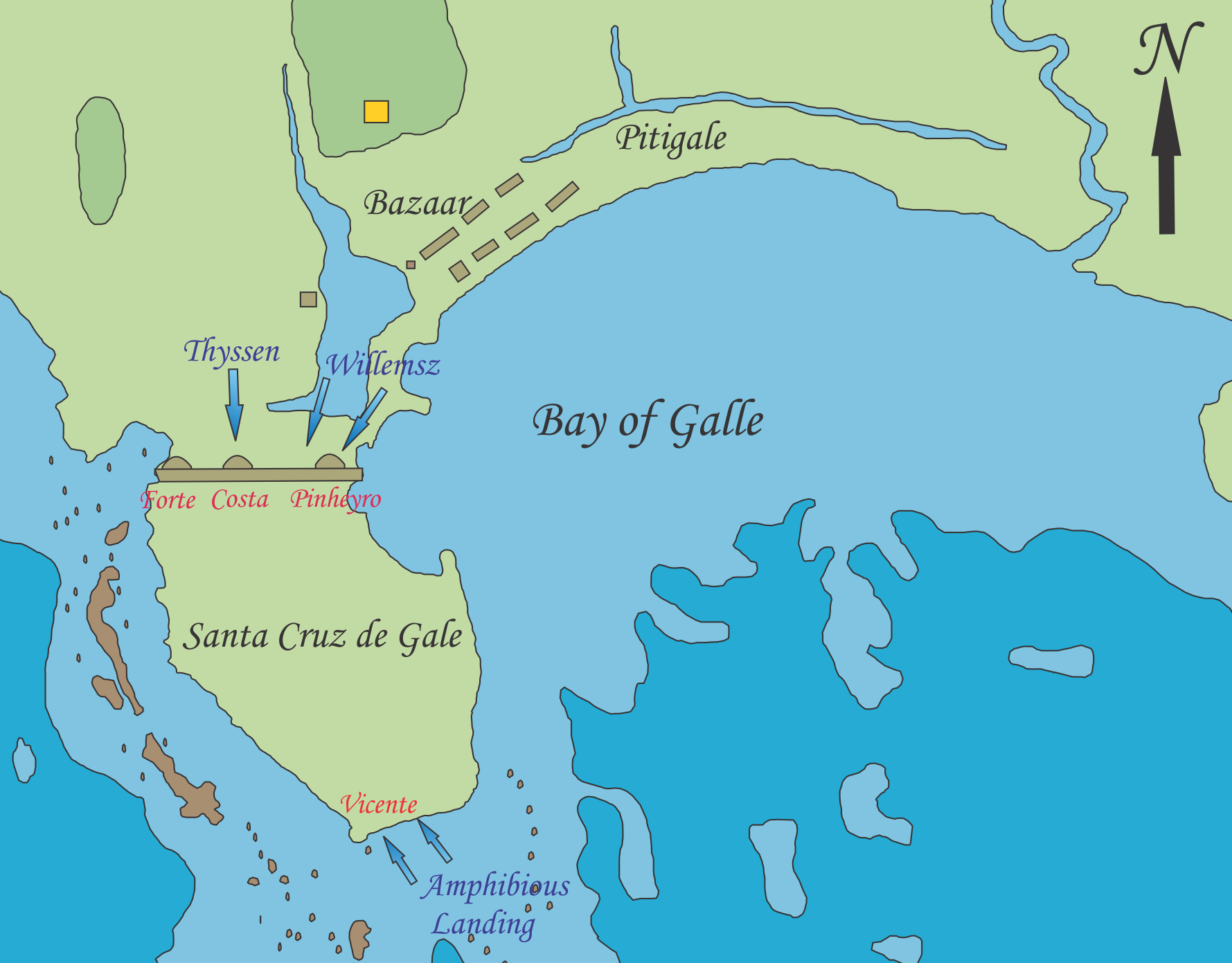
The Dutch attack plan – they mounted an amphibious attack on the southern tip as a diversionary attack before the main assault on the wall.

The Dutch army was divided into four groups. The first group, the vanguard, led by Commisaris Jan Thysen, was to attack the bastion of Conception. The center, commanded by Minne Williemsz Caertekoe, was to attack the Bastion of Santiago and the curtain between Conception and Santiago. The rearguard, commanded by Opperkoopmen Simon de Wit, was to follow up the storming once a breach had been made. All the rest of the troops, carpenters, support troops, and two Kandyan units, which had arrived, formed the reserve force and occupied the high ground where the battery was mounted. They were commanded by Fiscal Gerard Herbers, the former Dutch commander of the fort at Trincomalee. Preparations were made rapidly and in support of the land troops the Dutch brought in many sailors and ladders from the fleet ships.

On the morning of the 13th, at the beginning of the dawn watch, Portuguese sentries observed that Dutch launches were making toward the fort. At the same time spies reported that the Dutch were serving ladders and they observed increased activity within the enemy camp. Lourenço Ferreira de Brito, realizing that the Dutch were about to attack, gave orders to sound the alarms.

== Dutch storm the fort ==
=== Battle at the ramparts ===
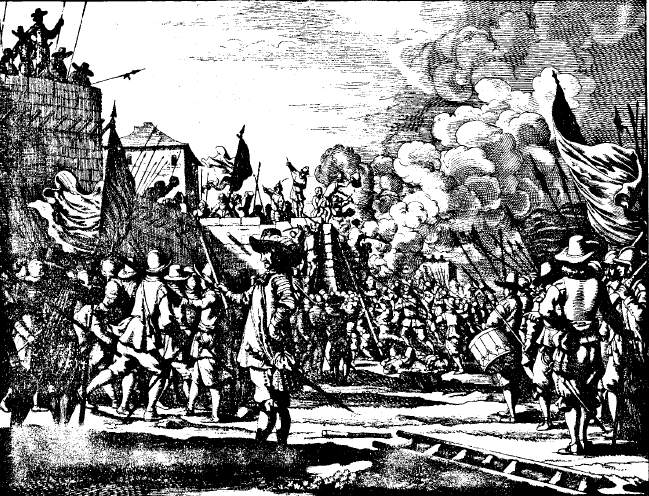
The Dutch Storm the Fort of Galle, by Phillipus Baldaeus (1672).

The Dutch began their attack with an amphibious assault on the bastion of Santa Cruz using launches and shallops to land troops. The captain of the fort, Lourenço Ferreira, realized that this was just a diversionary attack and without committing additional troops he ordered the units defending that area to assist each other. As the amphibious attack was in progress, the Dutch vanguard and center mounted the main attack marking the beginning of the battle at the ramparts.

A total of 1,100 Europeans and 300 Bandanese troops formed the first wave and out of them nearly 500 attacked the Bastion of Santiago. They charged giving the Dutch battle cry "Conquer or die!". The Portuguese garrison opened fire with artillery, which was followed by swivel guns once the Dutch troops closed on their position. The mortar mounted at the main-guard was manned by a group of casados led by Bernardo Gonçalves and used to fire upon the troops attacking from the beach, but on the second shot the mortar exploded carrying part of the curtain with it (Dutch troops later used this gap to assail the bastion). Soon the Dutch began to scale the wall with ladders and the Portuguese hurled the ladders and retaliated with spears, swords, powder pots, and many incendiary weapons. Lourenço Ferreira, after making sure that the Dutch were not going to attack from the direction of the harbor, diverted men from the bay side to the wall, further strengthening the defenses. While the Dutch concentrated their attack on the bastions of Conception and Santiago, Portuguese from Bastion of Santo António fired upon the Dutch troops who were scaling the Conception, with artillery and muskets. Many Dutch troops were killed and some who were burnt threw themselves into the sea. The Dutch commander of the vanguard, Commisaris Jan Thysen, later wrote "at the beginning of the storm, matters seemed very doubtful in consequence of the powerful resistance offered by those in the city".

The Portuguese managed to repulse the Dutch attacks on two occasions but on the third attempt, the Dutch managed to obtain the upper hand. They concentrated their attacks on the bastion of Santiago which had a low small terrace. They hurled many fire darts and grenades which set fire to the barrels, cartridges, and powder pots that were stored on the bastion. Most of the Portuguese defenders were burnt and the rest retired wounded. A Portuguese sergeant major then sent the Dissave of Matara to the Retreat in order to bring more powder, munitions, and fire pots to defend Santiago. Meanwhile, Captain Lourenço Ferreira tried to reinforce it twice with his patrol, but the fire caused by continuous Dutch grenade attacks forced them to retire on both occasions. On the third occasion Lourenço Ferreira was wounded by four bullets and fell to the ground with a broken arm and laid there incapacitated. With his loss, Ensign Major Valentim Pinheiro, a young boy, took over the command and resisted the Dutch attack. As their commanders sounded the retreat, recalling the third attack, the Dutch troops managed to enter the bastion of Santiago. The Dutch rapidly renewed the attack and manned the Portuguese artillery pieces which were on the terrace. Using them, the Dutch dislodged the defenders from the nearby curtains of the wall.

Meanwhile, a special storming party reserved to carry out an attack on the mainguard swiftly descended over the terrace. The Dissawe of Four Korale, António de Fonseca Pereira, who was called up from the inner stockade to strengthen the defenses with his troops, mounted a stiff resistance with the remaining defenders and the Kaffir reserve force. However, they were dislodged and the Dutch managed to secure the mainguard. Two hours after the assault began, they opened the Wall Gate, and allowed the rearguard to enter the city.

=== Battle for the city ===
The devoted wife of the captain of Galle fort, Lourenço Ferreira, used to accompany him during his routine inspections and was nearby when he was incapacitated. When the rushing Dutch soldiers came on to kill him she threw herself over him and pleaded for them to kill her and spare her beloved husband. A Dutch captain, who witnessed this incident, took them under his protection. According to Portuguese sources, once Commodore Coster learnt of this, he withdrew the “no quarter” order and ordered his men to spare those who took refuge in houses and inside churches.

Meanwhile, Opperkoopmen Simon de Wit's units entered the city and formed into two squadrons. The first squadron advanced parallel to the wall while the second squadron under Captain Major Adrian Cornelio advanced towards the monastery of Misericórdia. The first squadron engaged the Portuguese soldiers who were abandoning the Bastion of Conception, after their commanders were killed by the artillery fire from Santiago. Following a heavy fight at the base of the bastion, the Portuguese were overwhelmed and the Dutch managed to capture the Conception. They then advanced towards the bastion of Santo António. A sergeant major who was there managed to breakout with his patrol squad, but the rest of the defenders got trapped inside the bastion. Realizing that the Portuguese were determined to fight to the end, the Dutch sent for the wife of Captain António Lourenço Forte who was in command within. They requested that she persuade the defenders to surrender to avoid unnecessary bloodshed, but she refused. The Dutch then began their assault and Francisco da Silva, the Dissave of Seven Korale, was killed at the foot of the bastion while defending its approaches. Although many Dutch soldiers were killed by a grapeshot round fired from a falcon, the Dutch forced their way into the bastion and after a short struggle they secured the bastion. They killed all the defenders including the captains Lourenço Forte and Bartolomeu d'Eça.

Francisco Antunes, the Dissave of Matara, who was returning with ammunition, came across the second Dutch squadron near the monastery of Misericórdia. With the Canarese musketmen who were on their way to reinforce the bastion of Santiago, he tried to organize a counterattack, but his men were scattered by the artillery fire from the bastions and the sweeping musket fire from advancing columns. Francisco Antunes got separated from the rest of his men. When he tried to get to the bastion of Conception he came across the sergeant major who was retreating from the "Santo António". After learning of the loss of the bastions they decided to fall back to the "Retreat". They managed to fight their way through several enemy squadrons and with 15 Portuguese soldiers made it to the Retreat. From there, they descended to the rocky shore to escape, but were captured by Dutch troops.

=== Surrender ===
After securing the church yard of Misericórdia, Dutch troops led by Captain Major Adrian Cornelio attacked St. Domingo, which was held by Portuguese and Kaffir troops who withdrew from the wall. They were led by the Dissawe of Four Korale. After mounting a brief resistance they abandoned the church and withdrew to the Retreat. Later they (altogether numbering 60 men) surrendered to the Dutch realizing the futility of unnecessary bloodshed.

In the meantime bands of Dutch troops overran the city eliminating any Portuguese who were found armed. Despite the withdrawal of the order to give no quarter, the Portuguese accused the Dutch of killing some Portuguese in cold blood and even the ill, who were on beds. By this time Kandyan units had arrived and they too joined the fight. They invested the surrounding area and managed to capture many Lascarins and Portuguese who were fleeing from the sea side of the fort. Some joined the fight within the city and the Portuguese later claimed that Kandyan troops did not even spare the "innocent". Several notable Portuguese ladies were among the dead. D. Tomázia Coutinho and Joana do Couto were claimed to have died of grief while some others took their own lives. Portuguese author Fernão de Queiroz wrote, "... so many women at the sight of their husbands, sons, brothers and relations, killed in these streets, or others who gave up their souls to God and were killed under their own eyes, which made some offer their own throats, either to deliver them or to escape from the affronts which they already experienced and dreaded?"

After securing St. Domingo, the Dutch sent a detachment to attack the Portuguese forces that were still defending the southern tip of the fort. These Portuguese troops under Captain Vicente Mendes took refuge in the Bastion of Santa Cruz. Since they were pressed on both fronts and they lacked cannons to defend the bastion, they too surrendered marking the end of the battle for the city. By 10:00 in the morning on 13 March 1640, Dutch troops eliminated all resistance and captured the Santa Cruz de Gale.

== Casualties ==
"The streets were littered with dead Portuguese and Hollanders, some scorched to death by fire, others torn to pieces by shot, and others riddled with bullets; and the Caffirs [Kaffirs] had to spend three days in burying them, 10 or 12 in each pit."

— Fernão de Queiroz

The Portuguese lost nearly one hundred men including nine captains and 24 casados. Casualties amongst the Lascarins, Canarese musketmen and Kaffirs are not known. Seven hundred Portuguese men, women, children, and slaves were taken as prisoners. As per prior agreements, captured Lascarins and Sinhalese (1500 in total) were handed over to the Kandyan King. Captured Kaffirs and Canarese musketmen were employed by the Dutch to increase their numbers.

Dutch casualty figures are in dispute. The Dutch officially accepted 100 dead Hollanders and another 400 wounded. Casualty figures of Badanese and Malay troops were not given. On the other hand, the Portuguese estimated 450 dead (including 15 captains) and 500 wounded Hollanders with 700 Bandanese and Malay troop losses in the battle for the ramparts alone. Regardless of the differing figures, Dutch casualty rates were considered higher than expected by the Dutch troops, giving rise to the proverb “Gold in Malacca and lead in Galle”.

There were a few unmarried Mestiços women and a large number of widows within the fort and Dutch commanders gave permission to the soldiers to marry them "to prevent all future unpleasantness". The Dutch sent all the Portuguese prisoners with 19 religious personals including Fr Luís Pinto, Superior of the Society of Jesus, to Batavia, Malacca, and Achem. Among them was the captain of the fort, Lourenço Ferreira de Brito, who was still in a critical condition but alive due to the special care given to him by the Dutch.

== Aftermath ==
The two generals finally arrived on 12 April 1640 and were greeted by the relieved Portuguese who were anxious by their delay. They had run into a storm and had decided to rest and refit at Mannar. Governor António Mascarenhas was so infuriated by their decision to delay that he summoned them to provide explanations for their actions. Colombo soon received additional reinforcements from Bengal, Tranquebar, and Negapatam. With these reinforcements, they managed to recapture Negombo on 8 November 1640. In retaliation for the actions of the Dutch at Galle, the Portuguese were determined not to give quarter to the defenders but the veterans managed to convince their commanders to accept the surrender.

Fiscal Gerard Herbers delivered the news of the conquest to Batavia by the ships Utrecht and Middelburg and the victory was celebrated on 29 April 1640 with a thanksgiving service and a military display. Throughout the next few years, the Portuguese harassed Galle Korale but failed to recapture the fort. Once they tried to bribe the Dutch commander to surrender the fort but it proved unsuccessful. Later, after the loss of Colombo in 1656 and Jaffna in 1658, Portuguese colonial rule in Sri Lanka ended.

=== Allegations of poisoning and ill-treatment of prisoners ===
Of the 700 Portuguese prisoners taken many succumbed during the voyage to Batavia and Malacca. On one vessel alone there were 180 deaths, while on a ship called Traver there were 63 deaths. From another ship, which carried wounded Portuguese, only three survived the journey. The large numbers of deaths have been attributed to a variety of factors including wounds suffered during the battle, disease and the trauma of sailing port-to-port from Galle to Batavia. In addition, the Portuguese accused the Dutch of poisoning some prisoners by mixing their rice with chunambo or the lime of the pearl oyster shell. However, historian Paul E. Peiris has dismissed this claim as an "obsession in Portuguese to see poison in any regrettable death".

According to Queiroz, even after reaching Batavia and Malacca, the prisoners continued to be subjected to ill treatment. He accused the Dutch of violating contemporary norms by jailing Portuguese together with the native Javanese, chaining and forcing them to perform heavy labor, denying the privilege of ransom, forbidding Catholic icons, forcing orphans and widows to attend Dutch churches (kirks), and not providing adequate food, clothes, shelter and medical care. He vividly describes the hardship experienced by women and children.

... Clad in poor clothes, going about barefooted in the streets and thrown among slaves in poor huts, they were put to auction day after day, being often ordered to assemble, at one time to be counted, at another to receive a mat, again to receive a plate or a porringer and sometimes a cloth of the most miserable slaves, without any other clothing to cover themselves with. For the measure of rice, wretched and rotten and the bazaruco for curry these ladies who had been wealthy had even to go to the house of the one who distributed it, and bear insulting words and not a few blows. For want of medicine and nursing not a single pregnant escaped, and the same fate befell nearly all the children, and persons of the weak sex and delicate breeding died without any wound.

During the first year alone, 25 women, 35 children, five captains, and 95 soldiers died in captivity. Due to the continuous efforts of Fr. Luís Pinto, Captain Lourenço Ferreira de Brito and others, conditions improved slightly and after nine months the Dutch agreed to release the civilians in exchange for a ransom. However, the Dutch declined to release the soldiers even after the ransom was offered. Queiroz claimed that the Dutch officers from Zeeland were most envious of the Portuguese, but after all the accusations he also stated that "... even among them there are men of honor and of good nature."

=== Political and military consequences ===
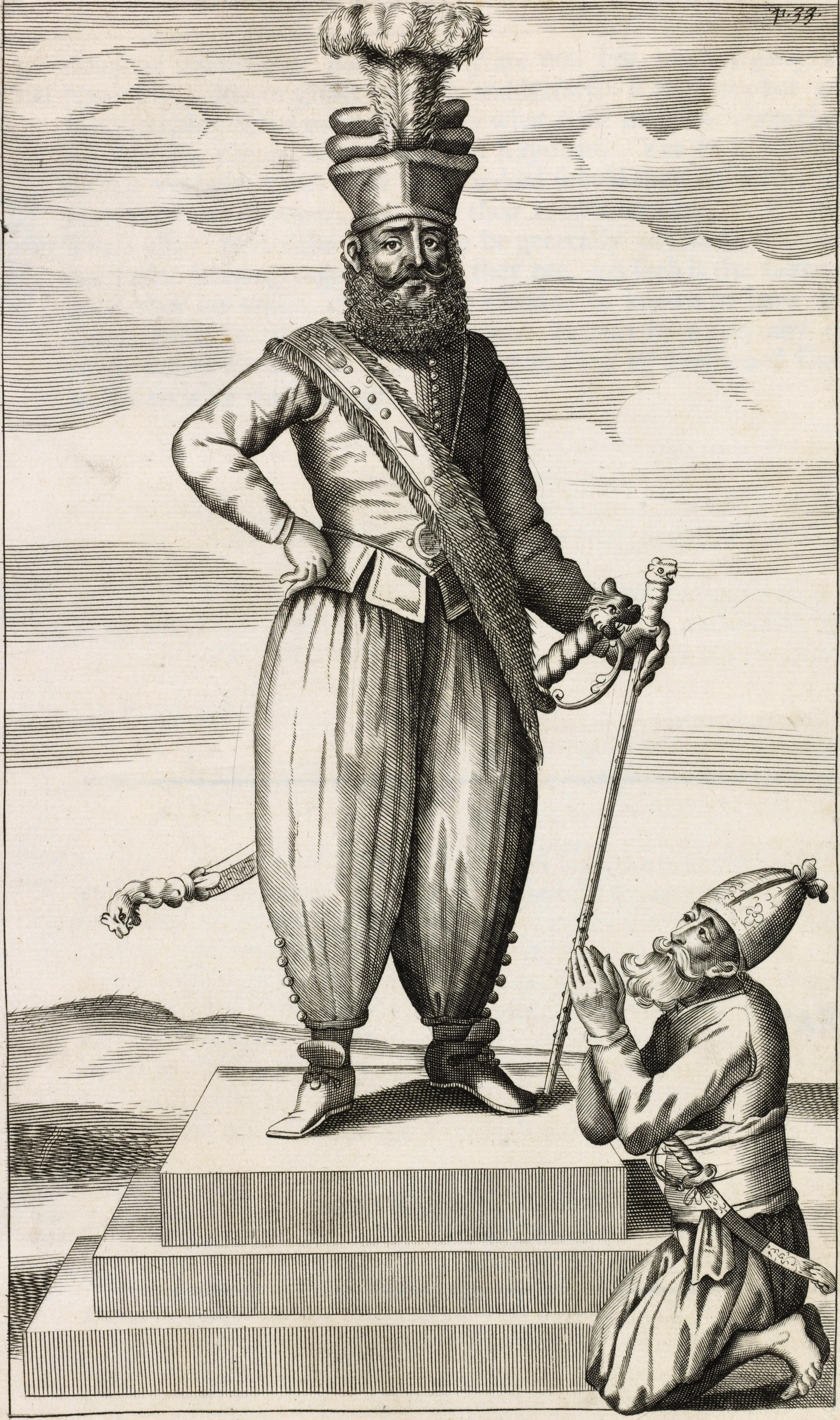
Rajasingha II, from Robert Knox's A Historical Relation of the Island Ceylon.

After the battle, the Dutch secured 22,000 bales of cinnamon and a considerable amount of areca nut. These were shared with the Kandyan king but King Rajasinghe II was convinced that the Dutch officers, when dividing the spoils, had tricked him. He also complained that Costers' decision to assault the fort before the agreed hour had been made to prevent his men from taking part in the assault. Meanwhile, the continued Dutch occupation of the captured forts, instead of handing them over to the Kandyans, further strained their relationship. In the treaty, an article stated that "all the forts captured from the Portuguese should be garrisoned by the Dutch, if the king so desired..." This important conditional clause appeared only in the King's copy and it was deliberately removed from the Dutch copy. This almost led to the termination of the alliance, but both parties continued their uneasy relationship until 1656. By 1658, the Dutch were still occupying the eastern coastal forts while the Kandyans had captured the principalities of Kotte, which included Seven Korale, Three Korale, Four Korale, Bulatgama and Sabaragamuwa, thus increasing their territory.

Galle was the largest and most important acquisition made by Dutch up to that point. It provided them with the cinnamon lands which generated highest revenues in southern Sri Lanka. It also provided them with a large port, which was later used as a convenient naval base to blockade Goa and attack Portuguese strongholds in southern India. Due to these reasons and location's strategic value, the Dutch made Galle their headquarters in Ceylon until the capture of Colombo in 1656. The Dutch renamed the fort Point de Galle (also known as Puntegale) and in 1667 they replaced the old Portuguese bastions with new ones.

== Popular conceptions ==
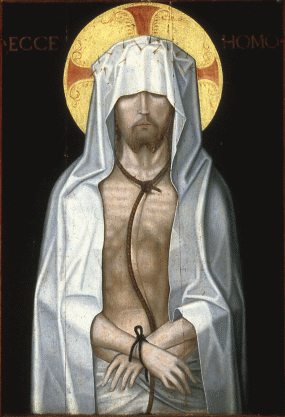
15th-century Portuguese painting depicting Ecce Homo.

Sometime before the siege, a figure had been seen in the streets of Galle crying out "Woe to thee O Gale". Portuguese writer Queiroz considered it as a divine warning to the citizens of Galle.

On the day which the Galle fort was captured, Pedro de Basto, (Note: Pedro de Basto, son of António Machado Barbosa, was a Jesuit priest who lived in Kochi. He was famous for his prophetic predictions and his prophecy of three broken spears is considered as an accurate prediction of losses of Colombo, Mannar and Jaffna divisions, the last three Portuguese strongholds of Sri Lanka.) a Jesuit priest of Kochi, had a vision of Jesus Christ as Ecce Homo which Queiroz believes was related to the outcome of the battle. He wrote, "whoever considers well all the blood that was shed there [Galle], the scourge of the State of Ceylon and of the Portuguese honor on that field and in that praça, and how much our reputation was exposed to shame in the east, seeing the scepter and crown of Ceylon turned to a mockery of fate, and a disgrace to the faith among heretics and infidels who do not know it, will find that this misfortune cannot be represented by a better or more appropriate figure than an Ecce Homo..." He further adds "...The wounds inflicted on His [God] feelings were no less than the scourges of our punishment, for as He cannot fail in Himself, He felt compassion for what his justice punished, and more justly He afflicted us, the greater was the grief He represented Himself as the suffering."

António Jorge, the Portuguese captain in charge of the gate through which the Dutch infiltrators gained access to the fort during the siege of Negombo, was later court martialed despite the fact that he believed it had been closed by his subordinate officer. He was stripped of his rank and sentenced to run the gauntlet. Thereafter, he behaved like a dazed man, ill clad, without arms, hat-less and speaking to no one. He accompanied Mendonça to Galle with the relief force. However, during the battle of the bazaar, just before the Portuguese charged the reforming Dutch troops in a palm grove, he was seen in splendid attire as his former self causing another captain to exclaim "Ah! Master António Jorge: What is this? A very fine gentleman you are!". He replied, "António Jorge lives disgraced in the world. He must either die with honour or recover the loss." He was among the first to charge the Dutch position and was killed during the action.

== See also ==
- Galle Fort

== Bibliography ==
- Antonio Bocarro, "Description of Ceylon". (TBH Abeysinghe, Trans.) Journal of the Royal Asiatic Society of Sri Lanka. 1996; XXXIX (special issue)
- B. Gunasekara, The Rajavaliya. AES reprint. New Delhi: Asian Educational Services, 1995. ISBN 81-206-1029-6
- C. Gaston Perera, Kandy Fights the Portuguese – A Military History of Kandyan Resistance. Vijithayapa Publications: Sri Lanka, June 2007. ISBN 978-955-1266-77-6
- Captain Joao Ribeiro, The Historic Tragedy of the Island of Ceilao. AES Reprint. New Delhi: Asian Educational Services, 1999. ISBN 81-206-1334-1
- Channa Wickramasinghe, Kandy at War: Indigenous Military Resistance to European Expansion in Sri Lanka 1594–1818. Vilithayapa Publications: Sri Lanka, 2004. ISBN 955-8095-52-4
- Fernao de Queyroz, The Temporal and Spiritual Conquest of Ceylon. (SG Perera, Trans.) AES reprint. New Delhi: Asian Educational Services; 1995. ISBN 81-206-0764-3
- Frederick Henry de Vos. "Old Galle – A Lecture Delivered by Mr F. H. De Vos". Journal of the Dutch Burgher Union of Ceylon. 1908 Sept;1(3)
- Paul E. Peiris, Ceylon the Portuguese Era: Being a History of the Island for the Period, 1505–1658, Volume 2. Tisara Publishers: Sri Lanka, 1992. (Link). OCLC 12552979.
- Paul E. Peiris, Some Documents Relating to the Rise of the Dutch Power in Ceylon, 1602–1670, From the Translations at the India Office.. C. A. C. Press: Colombo, 1929 (Link). OCLC 503954696.
- Phillipus Baldaeus, "A True and Exact Description of the Great Island of Ceylon", The Ceylon Historical Journal, Volume III, No 1–4. Published in co-operation with the Ceylon Branch of the Royal Asiatic Society, July 1958 to April 1959.
- S. G. Perera, A History of Ceylon For Schools – The Portuguese and Dutch period. The Associated Newspapers of Ceylon: Sri Lanka, 1942. (Link). OCLC 10531673.
- Zupanov Ines G, Goan Brahmans in the Land of Promise: Missionaries, Spies and Gentiles in Seventeenth and Eighteenth Century Sri Lanka. Wiesbaden. 2006. 171–210.
