= Governor Mascarenhas =

Governor Mascarenhas may refer to:

- António Mascarenhas (governor) (fl. 1630s), 14th Governor of Portuguese Ceylon from 1638 to 1640
- Filipe Mascarenhas (1580–?), 9th & 15th Governor of Portuguese Ceylon
