= Manuel Mascarenhas Homem =

Manuel Mascarenhas Homem may refer to:

- Manuel Mascarenhas Homem (governor), governor of Pernambuco (1596–1605), governor of Portuguese Ceylon (1614–1616)
- Manuel Mascarenhas Homem (viceroy) (1600–1657), 16th governor of Portuguese Ceylon (1645–1653), viceroy of Portuguese India (1653–1657)
