= Francisco de Melo e Castro =

Portuguese colonial governor

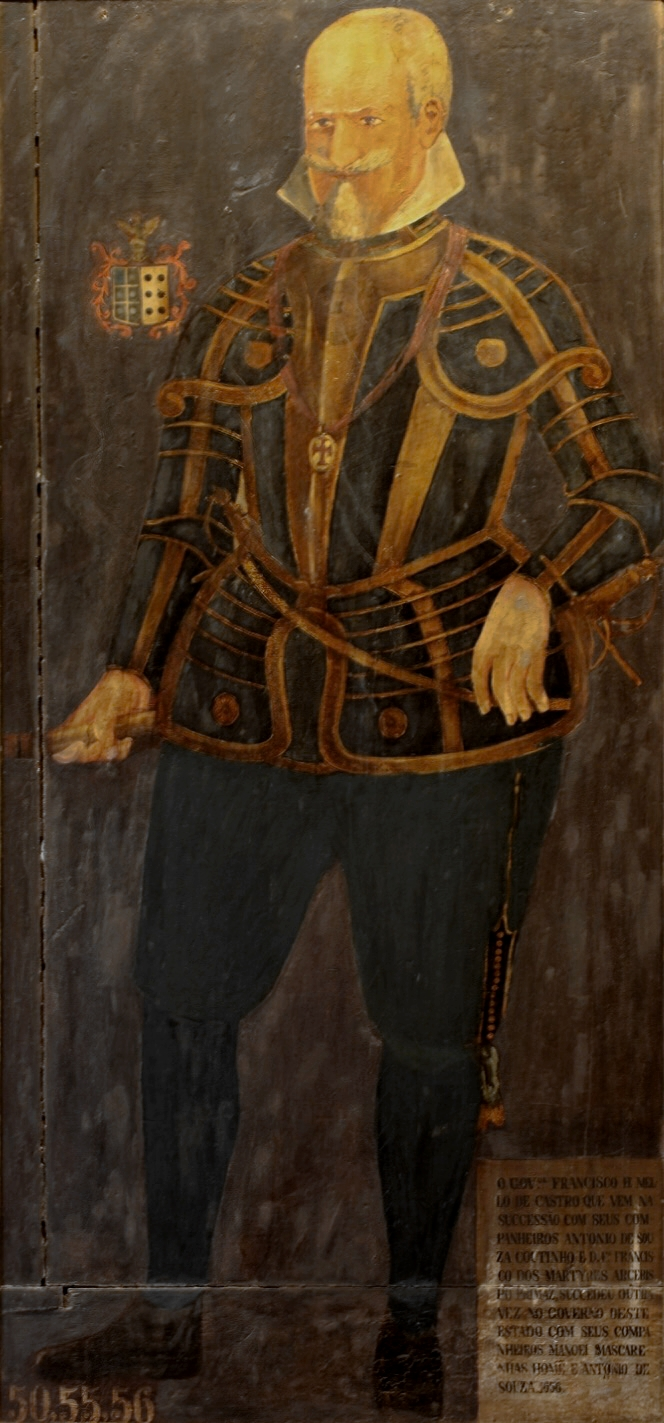

17th Governor of Portuguese Ceylon
- In office 1653–1655
- Monarch: John IV of Portugal
- Preceded by: Manuel Mascarenhas Homem
- Succeeded by: António de Sousa Coutinho

Personal details
- Born: c. 1600
- Died: 1664

Francisco de Melo e Castro was the 17th Governor of Portuguese Ceylon. He was appointed in 1653 under Philip III of Portugal, and was Governor until 1655. He was succeeded by António de Sousa Coutinho.

Government offices
Preceded by Manuel Mascarenhas Homem	Governor of Portuguese Ceylon; 1653–1655	Succeeded by António de Sousa Coutinho
