= Maldivian Annual Tribute =

Historical colonial tribute

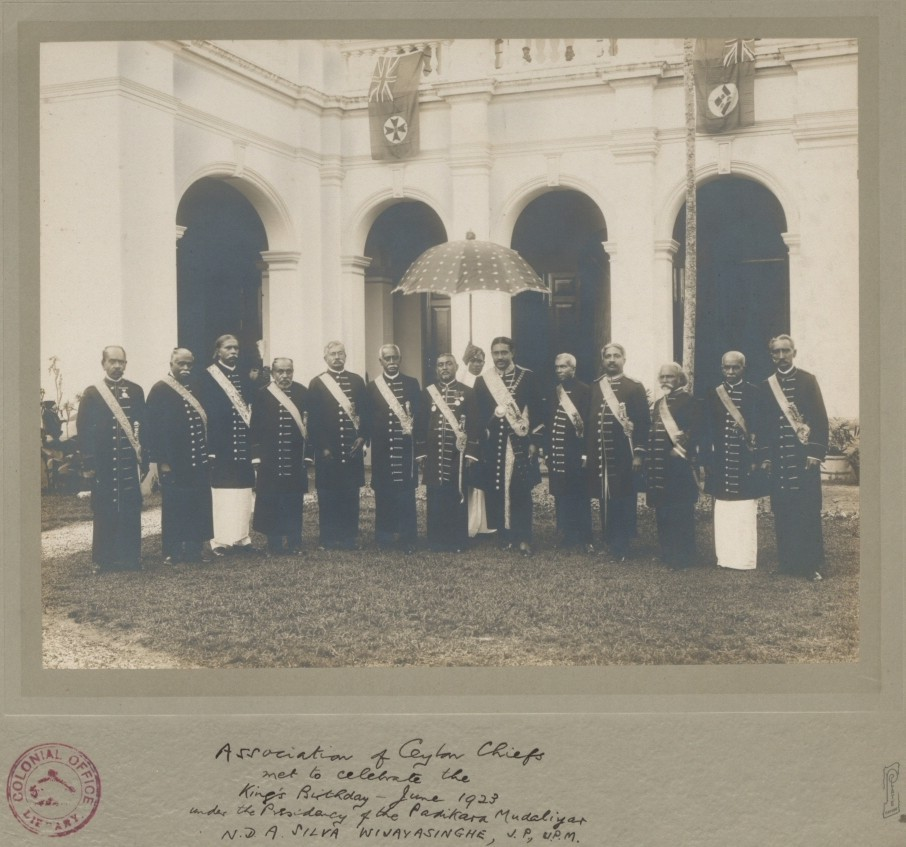
A group of Mudaliyars of the period.

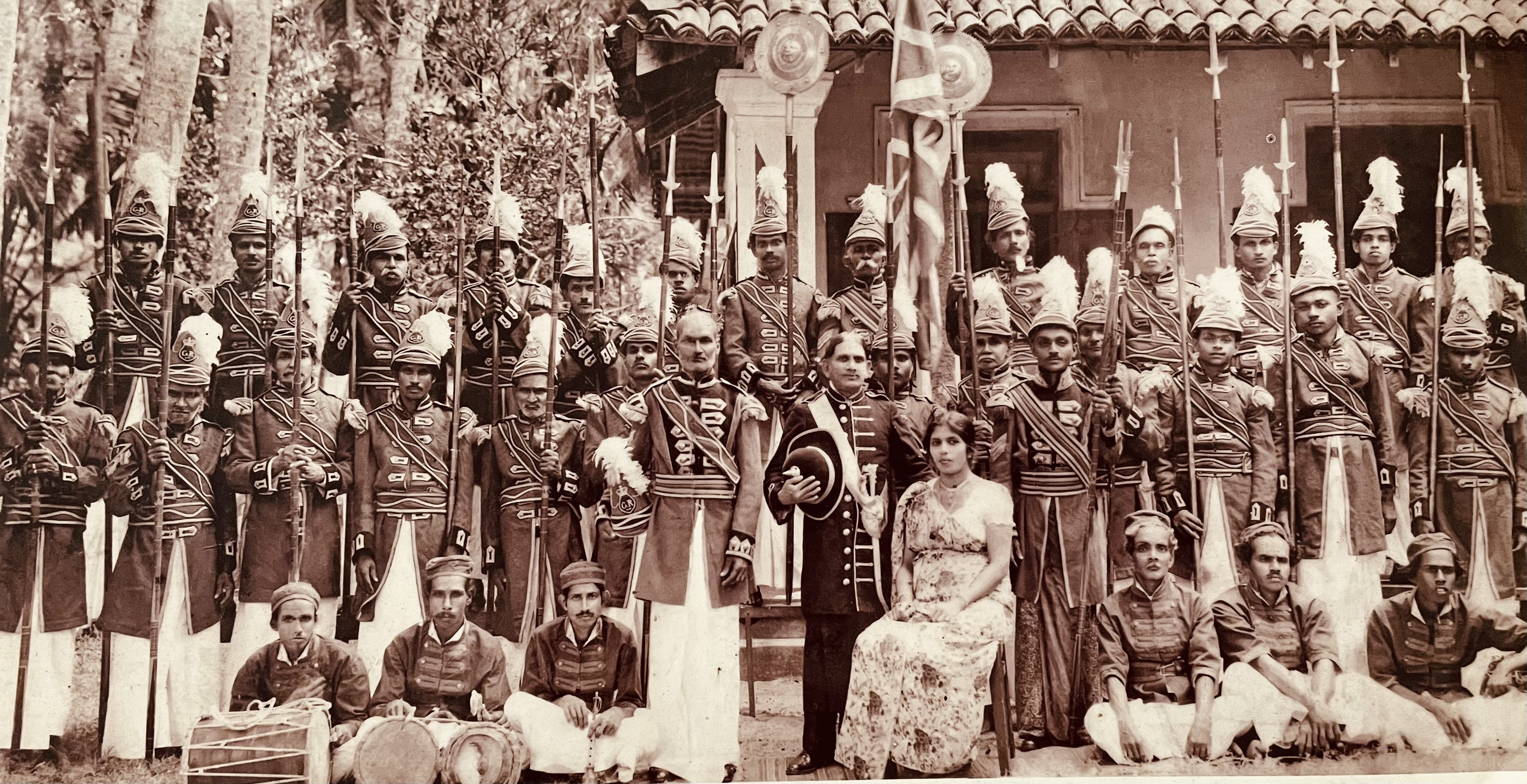
A typical Lascoreen Guard of the period.

The Maldivian Annual Tribute was a tribute presented each year by the Sultan of the Maldives to the British Governor of Ceylon. The tributes were presented after the Maldive islands became a British protectorate in 1887 and were carried out annually until 1947 when a new agreement removed the requirement of tributes, however Maldives remained a British protectorate until 1953 when the sultanate was suspended and the First Republic was declared.

== Ceremony ==
The presentation of tributes took place in November, with the Sultan's state schooner carrying the gifts arriving in Colombo at the end of the monsoon season. An afternoon was fixed and the Maldivian Representative in Colombo boarded the schooner and returned with several divahin carrying the gifts on their heads. The Maldivian party was met at the harbor jetty by Ceylonese Mudaliyars in uniform and a Lascarins guard of honour and band, as well as a police detachment to escort the Maldivian party to the Queen's House on foot. The streets would be lined with sightseers.

On arriving at Queen's House, the Maldivian Representative was formally received by the Governor and his officials. The Representative presented a letter wrapped in silk to the Governor from the Sultan. The presentation took places with two interpreters translating. The Governor would speak in English which would be translated to Tamil and the Maldivian interpreter would translate it to Divehi for the Maldivian Representative. The tribute was thereafter handed over followed by tea and the Maldivian Representative taking his leave.

== Tribute ==
The tribute would consist of a gift of the finest Maldivian produce such as Maldivian mats, lacquer, sweetmeats known as bondihalua, fish dish known as rihakuru, jars, shells and ambergris.

== Response ==
The Government of Ceylon would in turn send a letter to the Sultan accompanied by products from Ceylon.
