= António de Sousa Coutinho =

Portuguese colonial governor of Ceylon

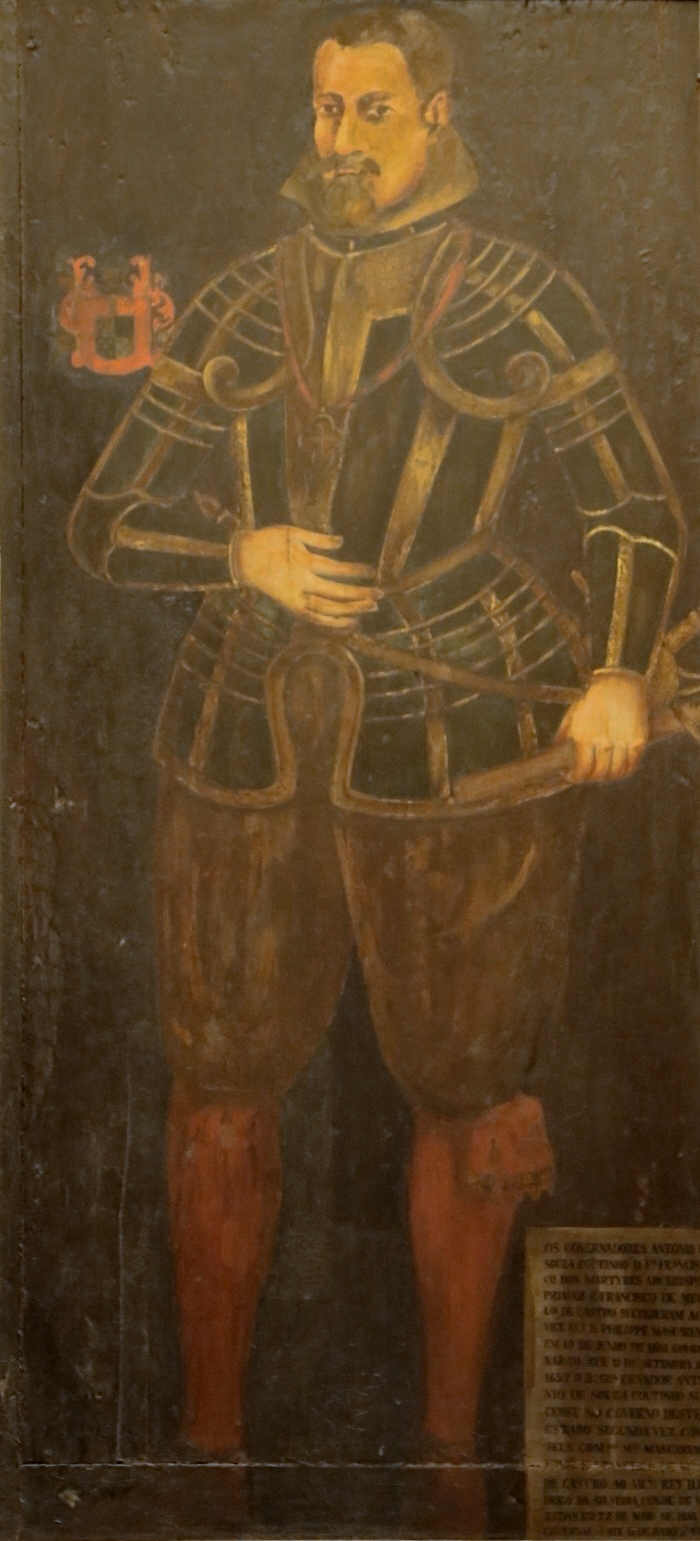

Governor of Ceylon
- In office 1655–1656
- Monarch: John IV
- Preceded by: Francisco de Melo e Castro
- Succeeded by: António de Amaral de Meneses

Personal details
- Died: 1668

António de Sousa Coutinho was a Portuguese colonial administrator, Governor of Ceylon from 1655 to 1656. Sousa Coutinho was appointed in 1655 under King John IV of Portugal, and he was Governor until 1656. He was succeeded by António de Amaral de Meneses.

Government offices
Preceded by Francisco de Mello e Castro	Governor of Portuguese Ceylon; 1655–1656	Succeeded by António de Amaral de Meneses
