= Jorge de Albuquerque =

7th Governor of Portuguese Ceylon
- In office 1622–1623
- Monarchs: Philip II of Portugal; Philip III of Portugal
- Preceded by: Constantino de Sá de Noronha
- Succeeded by: Constantino de Sá de Noronha

Jorge de Albuquerque was the 7th governor of Portuguese Ceylon. De Albuquerque was appointed in 1622 under Philip III of Portugal, he was governor until 1623. He was succeeded by Constantino de Sá de Noronha.

Government offices
Preceded by Constantino de Sá de Noronha	Governor of Portuguese Ceylon; 1622–1623	Succeeded by Constantino de Sá de Noronha
