= Jorge de Almeida =

Portuguese colonial governor

10th & 12th Governor of Portuguese Ceylon
- In office 1631–1633
- Monarch: Philip III of Portugal
- Preceded by: Filipe Mascarenhas
- Succeeded by: Diogo de Melo de Castro
- In office 1635–1636
- Monarch: Philip III of Portugal
- Preceded by: Diogo de Melo de Castro
- Succeeded by: Diogo de Melo de Castro

Jorge de Almeida was the 10th and 12th Governor of Portuguese Ceylon. de Almeida was first appointed in 1631 under Philip III of Portugal, he was Governor until 1633 and then in 1635 until 1636. He was succeeded by Diogo de Melo de Castro both times.

Government offices
Preceded by Filipe Mascarenhas	Governor of Portuguese Ceylon; 1631–1633	Succeeded by Diogo de Melo de Castro
Preceded by Diogo de Melo de Castro	Governor of Portuguese Ceylon; 1635–1636	Succeeded by Diogo de Melo de Castro
