= Constantino de Sá de Noronha =

Governor of Portuguese Ceylon

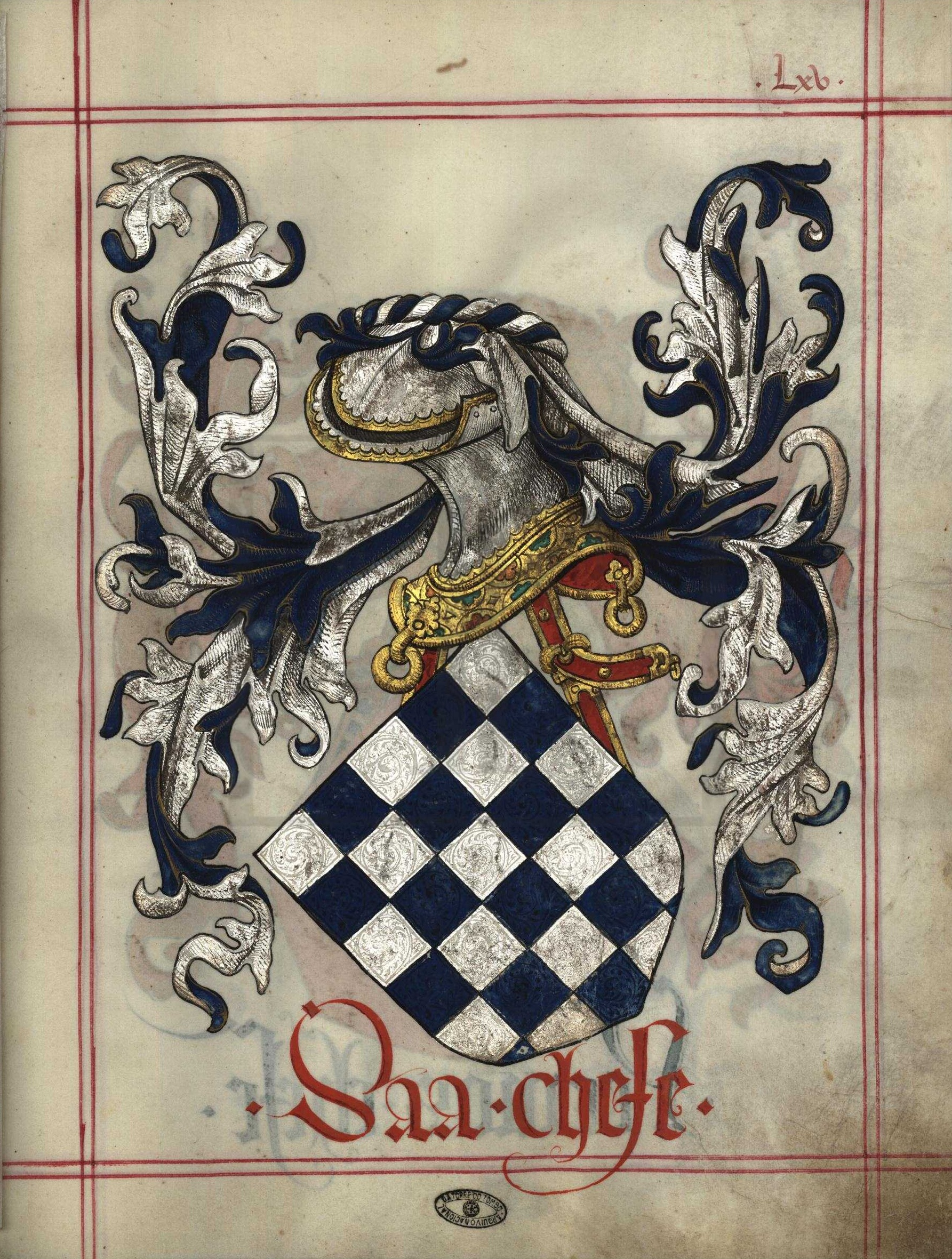
- Coat of Arms of the Sá family (Livro do Armeiro-Mor)

6th & 8th Governor of Portuguese Ceylon
- In office 1618–1622
- Monarchs: Philip II of Portugal; Philip III of Portugal
- Preceded by: Nuno Álvares Pereira
- Succeeded by: Jorge de Albuquerque
- In office 1623–1630
- Monarch: Philip III of Portugal
- Preceded by: Jorge de Albuquerque
- Succeeded by: Filipe Mascarenhas

Personal details
- Born: 1586
- Died: 25 August 1630 (aged 43–44) Randeniwela, Portuguese Ceylon
- Children: João Rodrigues de Sá e Meneses Joana Maria de Noronha Margarida de Mendonça

Constantino de Sá de Noronha was the 6th and 8th Governor of Portuguese Ceylon.

Sá de Noronha was first appointed in 1618 under Philip II of Portugal, he was Governor until 1622 and then in 1623 until 1630.

He was killed during the Battle of Randeniwela in a last stand after refusing to abandon his troops. Several accounts, though varying in accuracy, describe the moment of his death in detail.

The Journal of Robert Knox (1681):

The General, seeing that defeat, and himself like to be taken, called his black boy (slave) to give him water to drink, and snatching the knife that stuck by his boy’s side, stabbed himself with it

The Journal of João Ribeyro (1681):

The General, having done his duty as a chieftain and a soldier, threw himself in the midst of the enemy and cut down all who were bold enough to remain near him, till pierced with balls and arrows he fell dead on a heap of enemies whom he had slain.

More recently, the Sri Lankan author C. Gaston Perera, writing in 2007, admits the possibility that Constantino de Sá was killed by "friendly fire", from a Portuguese archer who, when trying to shoot down an attacker from the Sinhalese armies, hit by mistake the commander of the Portuguese forces, who subsequently surrendered.

He was succeeded by Jorge de Albuquerque and Filipe Mascarenhas respectively.

Government offices
Preceded by Nuno Álvares Pereira	Governor of Portuguese Ceylon; 1618–1622	Succeeded by Jorge de Albuquerque
Preceded by Jorge de Albuquerque	Governor of Portuguese Ceylon; 1623–1630	Succeeded by Filipe Mascarenhas
