= António de Amaral de Meneses =

19th Governor of Portuguese Ceylon
- In office 1656 – 22 June 1658
- Monarchs: John IV of Portugal; Afonso VI of Portugal
- Preceded by: António de Sousa Coutinho
- Succeeded by: Office abolished

António de Amaral de Meneses was the 19th and last Governor of Portuguese Ceylon. de Meneses was appointed in 1656 under John IV of Portugal, remaining Governor until 1658.

Government offices
Preceded by António de Sousa Coutinho	Governor of Portuguese Ceylon; 1656–1658	Succeeded by Office abolished
