= Manuel Mascarenhas Homem (viceroy) =

Viceroy of Portuguese Ceylon

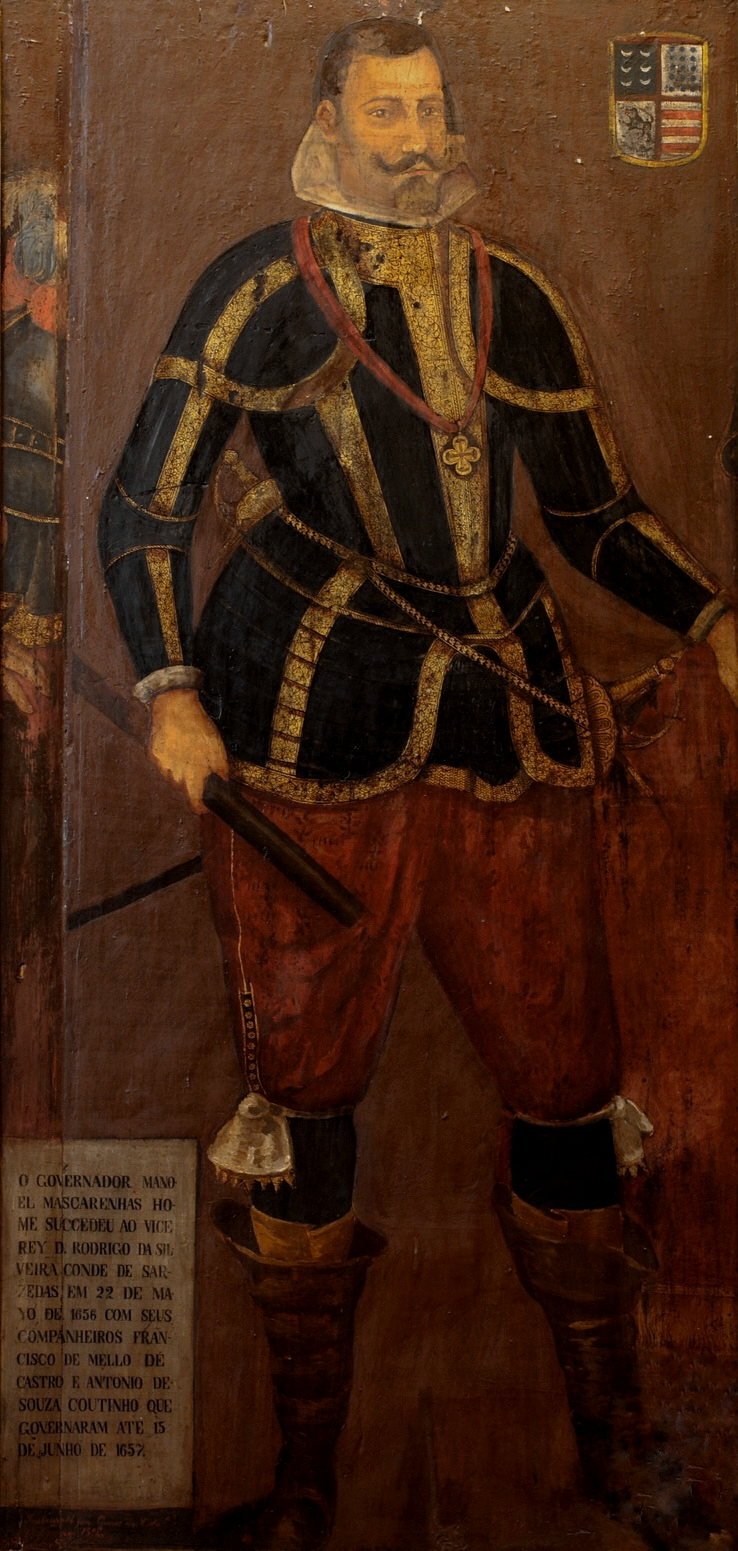

16th Governor of Portuguese Ceylon
- In office 1645–1653
- Monarch: Philip II of Portugal
- Preceded by: Filipe Mascarenhas
- Succeeded by: Francisco de Mello e Castro

Personal details
- Born: ~1600
- Died: 25 September 1657

Manuel Mascarenhas Homem was the Governor of Portuguese Ceylon and viceroy of Portuguese India.

Government offices
Preceded by Filipe Mascarenhas	Governor of Portuguese Ceylon; 1645–1653	Succeeded by Francisco de Mello e Castro
