= Filipe Mascarenhas =

Portuguese colonial governor

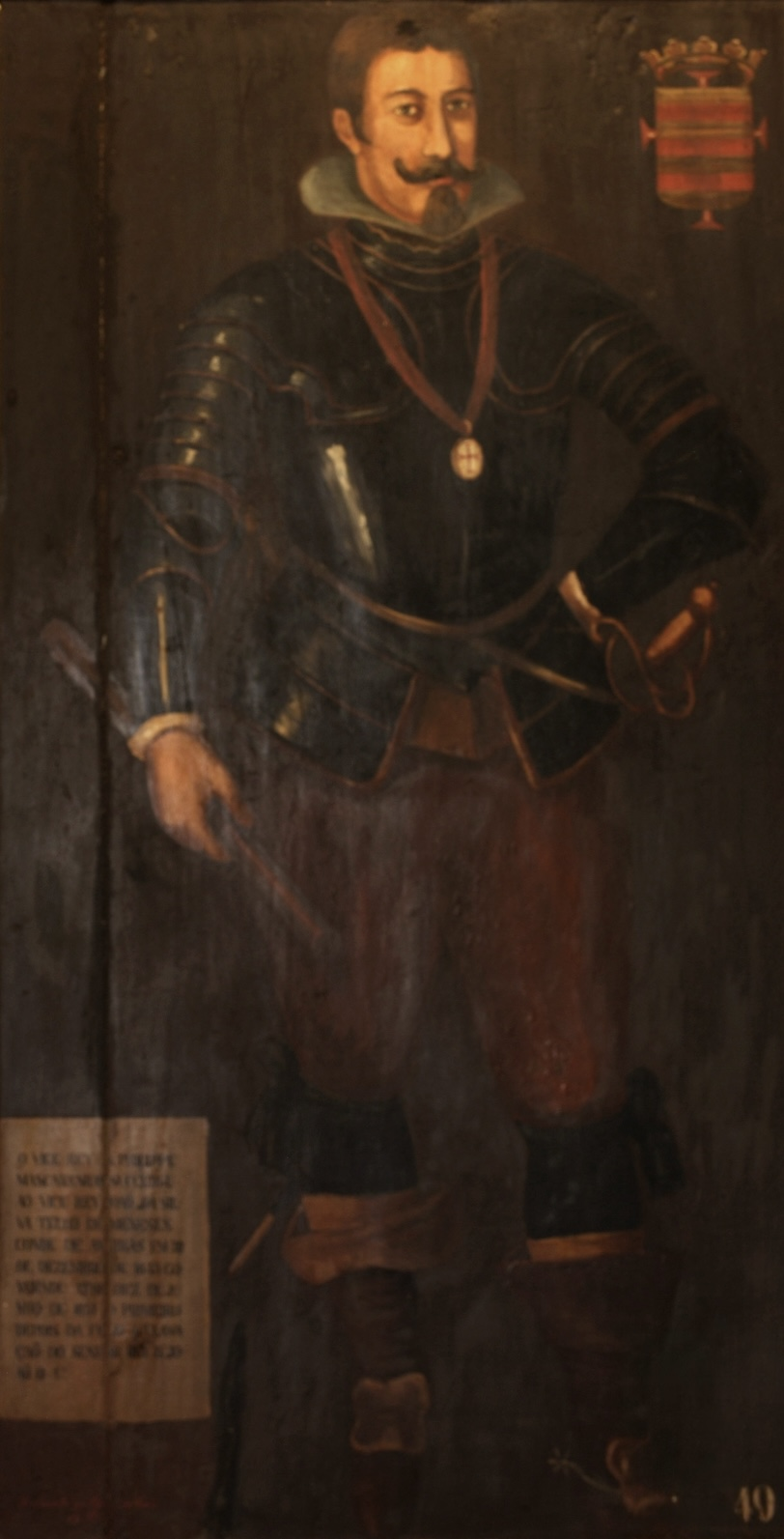

9th & 15th Governor of Portuguese Ceylon
- In office 1630–1631
- Monarch: Philip III of Portugal
- Preceded by: Constantino de Sá de Noronha
- Succeeded by: Jorge de Almeida
- In office 1640–1645
- Monarchs: Philip III of Portugal; John IV of Portugal
- Preceded by: António Mascarenhas
- Succeeded by: Manuel Mascarenhas Homem

Personal details
- Born: c. 1580
- Died: 16..

Filipe Mascarenhas was the 9th and 15th Governor of Portuguese Ceylon. Mascarenhas was first appointed in 1630 under Philip III of Portugal, he was Governor until 1631 and then from 1640 to 1645. He was succeeded by Jorge de Almeida and Manuel Mascarenhas Homem respectively.

Government offices
Preceded by Constantino de Sá de Noronha	Governor of Portuguese Ceylon; 1630–1631	Succeeded by Jorge de Almeida
Preceded by António Mascarenhas	Governor of Portuguese Ceylon; 1640–1645	Succeeded by Manuel Mascarenhas Homem
