= Diogo de Melo de Castro =

11th & 13th Governor of Portuguese Ceylon
- In office 1633–1635
- Monarch: Philip III of Portugal
- Preceded by: Jorge de Almeida
- Succeeded by: Jorge de Almeida
- In office 1636–1638
- Monarch: Philip III of Portugal
- Preceded by: Jorge de Almeida
- Succeeded by: António Mascarenhas

Diogo de Melo de Castro was the 11th and 13th Governor of Portuguese Ceylon. De Melo was first appointed in 1633 under Philip III of Portugal, he was Governor until 1635 and then in 1636 until 1638. He died in the Battle of Gannoruwa.

Diogo de Melo de Castro as a Governor General of Portuguese Ceylo

By the 1650s, the Portuguese had been in Ceylon for over 150 years, controlling the coastal regions and important cinnamon-producing areas. However, they were facing an existential threat from the Dutch East India Company (VOC), which was systematically capturing Portuguese territories in Asia. The Dutch wanted control of the lucrative spice trade, especially cinnamon, which grew abundantly in Ceylon.

Diogo de Melo de Castro arrived to govern during what turned out to be the final years of Portuguese control. Despite his efforts to defend the remaining Portuguese strongholds, he was ultimately fighting a losing battle. The Dutch had superior naval power and more resources, and they were gradually strangling Portuguese positions through blockades and military pressure.

His governorship ended in 1655, and just three years later, in 1658, the Portuguese lost their last major stronghold in Ceylon when the city of Jaffna fell to the Dutch. This marked the complete end of Portuguese rule on the island after about 150 years of colonial presence.

== His Role as Governor ==
De Melo was first appointed in 1633 under Philip III of Portugal and served as Governor until 1635, then again from 1636 until 1638 (Wikipedia) . During this period, the Portuguese were constantly engaged in military campaigns trying to expand or maintain their control over the cinnamon-rich lowlands while the Kingdom of Kandy resisted from the highlands. His death in battle tells us he was actively leading military operations, which was typical for colonial governors of that era who were often military commanders first and administrators second.

== His Death ==
This is actually the most documented part of his life that we have information about. Diogo de Melo de Castro died in the Battle of Gannoruwa (Wikipedia) , which was a significant military engagement during his second term as governor. This battle was part of the ongoing conflicts between the Portuguese colonial forces and the Kingdom of Kandy, the independent Sinhalese kingdom in the interior highlands of Ceylon that fiercely resisted Portuguese control throughout this period.

Government offices
Preceded by Jorge de Almeida	Governor of Portuguese Ceylon; 1633–1635	Succeeded by Jorge de Almeida
Preceded by Jorge de Almeida	Governor of Portuguese Ceylon; 1636–1638	Succeeded by António Mascarenhas
