= Lascarins =

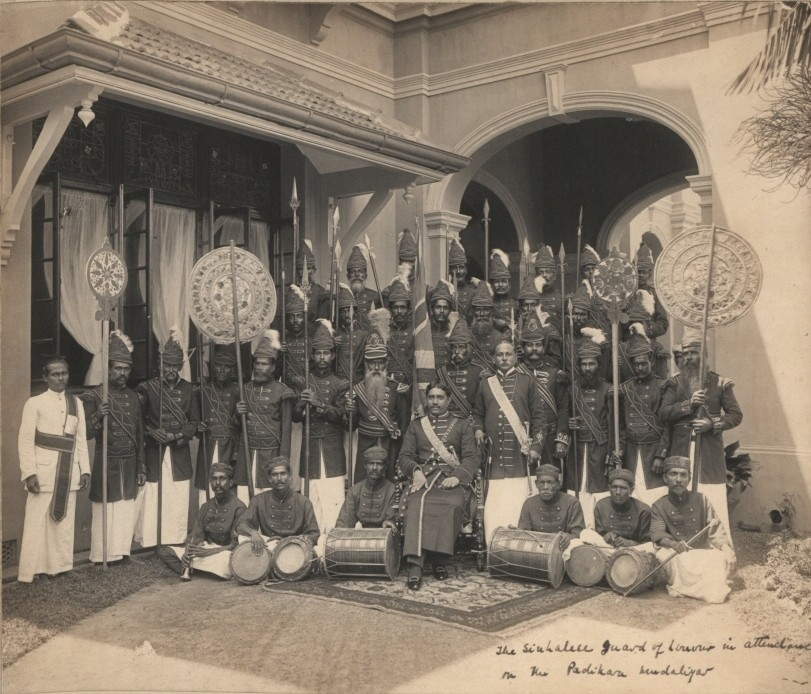
- The Private Lascoreen Guard of Padikara Muhandiram Arthur Silva Wijeyasinghe Siriwardena
- Active: 1500s–1930s
- Country: Portuguese Ceylon; Dutch period in Ceylon; British Ceylon
- Allegiance: Portuguese Empire; Dutch Empire; British Empire
- Branch: Army
- Type: Infantry
- Engagements: Sinhalese–Portuguese War; Dutch–Portuguese War

Lascarins (Sinhala: ලස්කිරිඤ්ඤ, romanized: laskiriñña, Tamil: லசுக்காரின், romanized: Lacukkāriṉ or Lascareen, Lascoreen and Lascarine) is a term used in Sri Lanka to identify indigenous soldiers who fought for the Portuguese during the Portuguese era (1505–1658) and continued to serve as colonial soldiers until the 1930s. The lascarins played a crucial role not only in the colonial armies, but also in the success of the campaigns of the local kingdoms.

== Derivation ==
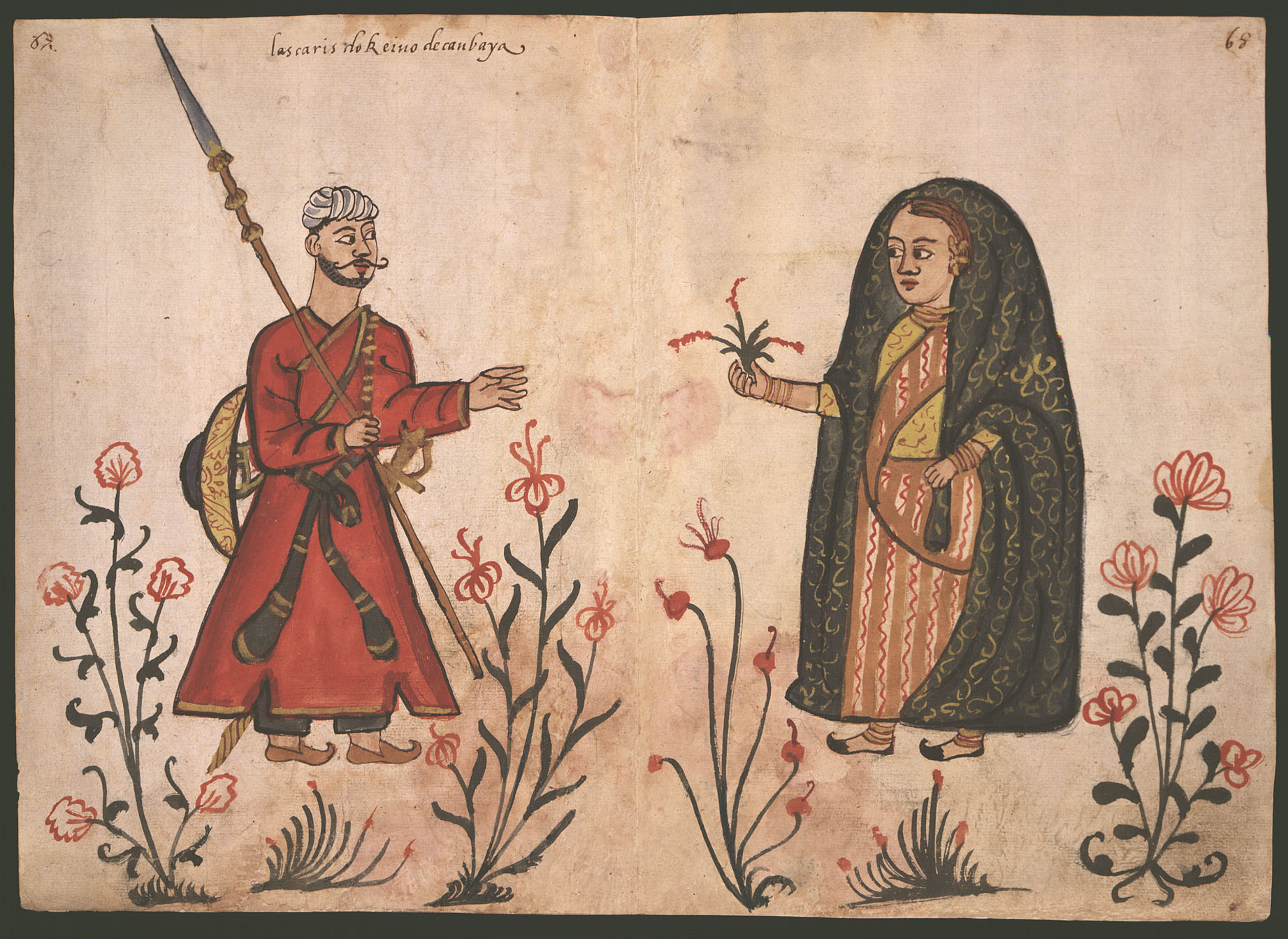
A 16th century Portuguese watercolour, depicting Lascaris of the Kingdom of Cambay and his wife.

The term originates from the Persian word Lascar, pronounced Lashkar (Persian: لشکر), meaning military camp or army — related to the Arabic 'Askar (Arabic: عسكر) derived from the former, meaning 'guard' or 'soldier' (whence Askari). The Portuguese adapted this term to lasquarim or lascarim, meaning an Asian militiaman or seaman. The latter meaning is preserved in English as Lascar. In Sri Lanka it was used in the military sense, which was also preserved in India as Gun Lascar. The Dutch adapted it to lascorijn and the English to lascariin, lascarine, lascoreen, etc.

== History ==
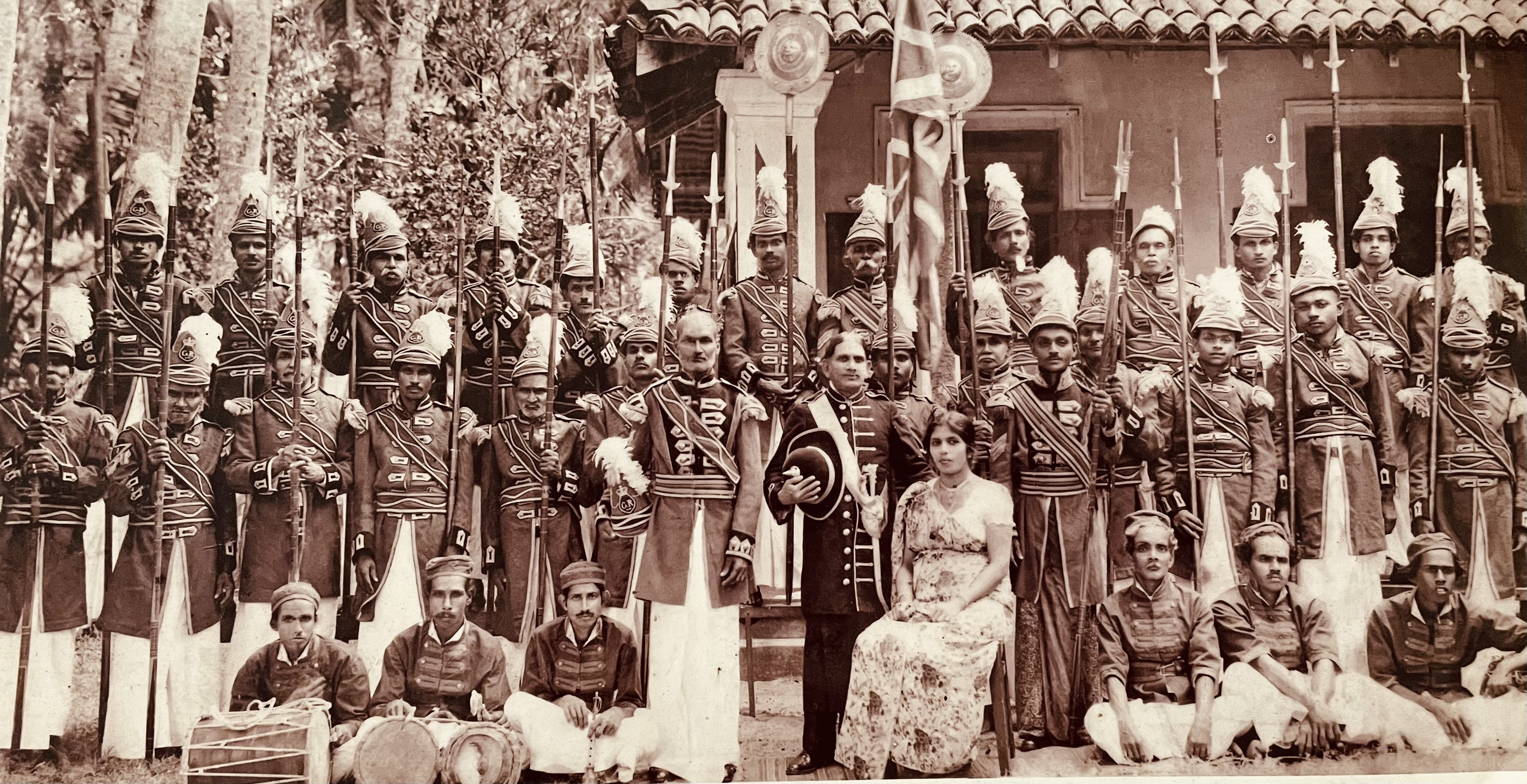
Photograph of the Private Lascoreen Guard of Basnayake Muhandirum Richard Weerackoon.

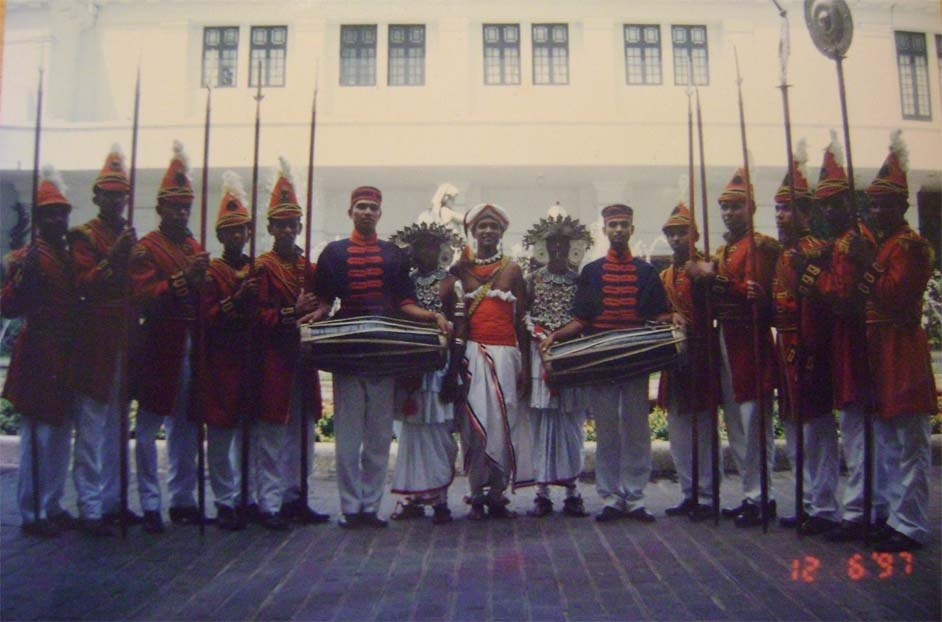
Reenactment of a Lascoreen Guard at Mount Lavinia Hotel in 1997.

The Portuguese first landed in Sri Lanka in 1505 and by 1517 they were able to erect a fort in Colombo and controlled most of the inbound and outbound trade affairs. After the historical event known as 'Wijayaba Kollaya' in 1521 they became involved in the internal affairs and conflicts between local kingdoms. Due to the limited manpower from Portugal, the Portuguese hired local soldiers to defend Portuguese and the Kotte kingdom's interests and to assist in offensive purposes. Almost all of these Lascarins were Catholic converted Karava, Karaiyar and Nairs. This was a time when many members of local royalty adopted Catholicism as their faith. After the Portuguese imposed direct control on local kingdoms (mainly the Kingdom of Kotte), many of the forces loyal to the king of Kotte became Lascarins and continued to hold ranks such as Mudali, Muhandiram, Arachchi or Kankani.

Lascarins were crucial for the occupying Portuguese forces, during their battles against local kingdoms because they knew the local geography. In almost every early battle the Portuguese fought in Sri Lanka, the majority of their army was composed of Lascarins. The Lascarin's loyalty was however quite an issue. On many occasions other than in the Portuguese conquest of the Jaffna kingdom, the lascarins changed sides and supported the local kingdoms. In the 1594 Campaign of Danture the forces of Wimaladharmasuriya doubled as a result of these defections and in the Battle of Randeniwela, the Portuguese expedition of 1630, almost the entire contingent of Lascarins defected. In both the formidable campaign of 1603 led by Jerónimo de Azevedo as well as in the Battle of Gannoruwa, the last major battle in the Sinhalese–Portuguese War, the lascarins defected en masse. For this reason, the Portuguese started to rely more on Indian, African (Kaffirs) and Malay mercenaries in their offensive campaigns during the latter stages of their rule. Lascarins also took part on both sides during the Dutch–Portuguese War which ended the Portuguese occupation of coastal Sri Lanka.

Lascarins served on with the Dutch during the period 1640–1796. Lascarins were divided into 'ranchuwas' (randje) meaning company, each consisting of two or three native headmen, Mohandiram, Arachchies, or Kankanis and 24 rank and file. Several 'ranchus' were under the Mudaliyar of a Korale.

During the British era they lost their military role becoming more of a ceremonial guard. Governor retained a detachment of Lascarins including Kanganies on pay and pensionable appointment. They would provide the honour guard for visits by members of the Royal Family and the Maldivian delegation bring the Maldivian annual tribute, to the Governor of Ceylon. Lascarins were maintained as small private units of powerful Mudaliyars who maintained them with the approval of the British authorities on the grounds of personal protection. The official practice of maintaining Lascarins by Mudaliyars stopped after the closure of the Native Department and with it the official role of the Mudaliyars in 1937, although the title of Mudaliyar was awarded by the Government of Ceylon till 1956 until S. W. R. D. Bandaranaike suspended state honours in 1956. The Governor's contingent of Lascarins were maintained as part of the Governor's staff and continued as part of the Governor General's staff till 1956.

== Uniform ==
The full complement of the Ceylon Government Lascoreen Guard–of-Honour consisted of thirty-six guards clad in scarlet tunics with gold embroidery, white cloth/trouser and plumed headgear. They carried lances and 'sesath' (white parasol) and marched to the beat of the tom-tom band and flutes piping military music.

== Command ==
A Lascoreen Guard was under the command of a 'Basnayake Muhandiram.' 'Basnayake'- derived from Dutch (baas + naik) meaning chieftain and 'Muhandiram' an honorary title conferred on the native officials of the administrative hierarchy. The Lascoreens of each Korale (county) were commanded by the Mudaliyar, a rank corresponding to Captain in European regiments. Below him was the Muhandiram or Lieutenant. The non-commissioned officers were the Cangaans (sergeants) or Kanganies. Soldiers occupying the rank of Private were simply 'Lascoreens'.

== See also ==
- Portuguese Ceylon
- Campaign of Danture
- Portuguese conquest of the Jaffna kingdom
- Battle of Randeniwela
- Battle of Gannoruwa
- Dutch–Portuguese War
- Maldivian Annual Tribute
