= António Mascarenhas (governor) =

14th Governor of Portuguese Ceylon
- In office 1638–1640
- Monarch: Philip III of Portugal
- Preceded by: Diogo de Melo de Castro
- Succeeded by: Filipe Mascarenhas

António Mascarenhas was the 14th Governor of Portuguese Ceylon. Mascarenhas was appointed in 1638 under Philip III of Portugal and was Governor until 1640. He was succeeded by Filipe Mascarenhas.

Government offices
Preceded by Diogo de Melo de Castro	Governor of Portuguese Ceylon; 1638–1640	Succeeded by Filipe Mascarenhas
