= List of captain-generals of Portuguese Ceylon =

The Portuguese arrived in the Kingdom of Kotte in 1505. By 1594 they had appointed a captain-general to control the Portuguese occupied territory called Portuguese Ceylon on the island of modern-day Sri Lanka. In that time, there were numerous captain-generals until 1658. The post of captain-general was preceded by that of the captain-major in 1551 and before that by the captain in 1518.

== List of governors ==
Portrait	Name	Birth	Death	Governor from	Governor until	Sovereign
	Pedro Lopes de Sousa	-	-	1594	1594	Filipe I
	Jerónimo de Azevedo	1540	1625	1594	1612	Filipe I Filipe II
	Francisco de Meneses	-	-	1613	1614	Filipe II
	Manuel Mascarenhas Homem	-	-	1614	1616	Filipe II
	Nuno Álvares Pereira	-	-	1616	1618	Filipe II
	Constantino de Sá de Noronha (1st time)	-	-	1618	1622	Filipe II; Filipe III
	Jorge de Albuquerque	-	-	1622	1623	Filipe III
	Constantino de Sá de Noronha (2nd time)	-	-	1623	1630	Filipe III
	Filipe Mascarenhas (1st time)	1580	16..	1630	1631	Filipe III
	Jorge de Almeida (1st time)	-	-	1631	1633	Filipe III
	Diogo de Melo de Castro (1st time)	-	-	1633	1635	Filipe III
	Jorge de Almeida (2nd time)	-	-	1635	1636	Filipe III
	Diogo de Melo de Castro (2nd time)	-	-	1636	1638	Filipe III
	António Mascarenhas	-	-	1638	1640	Filipe III
	Filipe Mascarenhas (2nd time)	1580	16..	1640	1645	Filipe III; John IV
	Manuel Mascarenhas Homem	1600	-	1645	1653	John IV
	Francisco de Mello e Castro	1600	1664	1653	1655	John IV
	António de Sousa Coutinho	-	1668	1655	1656	John IV
	António de Amaral de Meneses (in Jaffna)	-	-	1656	22 June 1658	John IV; Afonso VI

== See also ==
- List of monarchs of Sri Lanka
- List of captains of Portuguese Ceylon
- List of captain-majors of Portuguese Ceylon
- History of Sri Lanka
