= Vithalrao Valaulikar =

Captain Vithalrao Gorki Valaulikar (c. 1730 – 23 June 1808), also known to the Portuguese as Vithoji Sinay Gorki or Vithul Sinay Gorki, was a Goan military commander and diplomatic envoy who served the Portuguese colonial administration.

== Military career ==
Valaulikar was the son of Goraksh Valaulikar. He began his military service as an alferes (ensign) under his father, who was a captain in the Portuguese military. Following the death of his father, he was promoted to the rank of captain in 1765 during the tenure of Viceroy Conde de Ega (1758–1765). He later rose to the position of military commandant. During his time as captain, he demonstrated tactical capability and bravery during a major conflict at Sanravle.

== Diplomatic service ==
Valaulikar subsequently entered diplomatic service and was appointed as a representative to the Peshwa court in Poona, where he was referred to as Vithul Gorakshrao. Over the course of his career, he was posted to Poona on five separate occasions, and also served at the Sawantwadi court.

In his role as a diplomatic envoy (vakeel) for the Portuguese administration, his service earned praise from successive Portuguese viceroys. He was held in high regard at the Peshwa court, which granted him ceremonial honors, including a palanquin and a torch (mashal).

In 1792, he wrote to the Governor-General of Portuguese India advising strict restriction on the imports of mango to all the territories which are now Maharashtra, thus ensuring that the Estado da India's Goan fruits would remain a rare commodity.

== Death ==
Valaulikar died in Poona on 23 June 1808 at the age of 78.
