= Neura, Goa =

Village in Goa, India

Neura Velakula
- Village
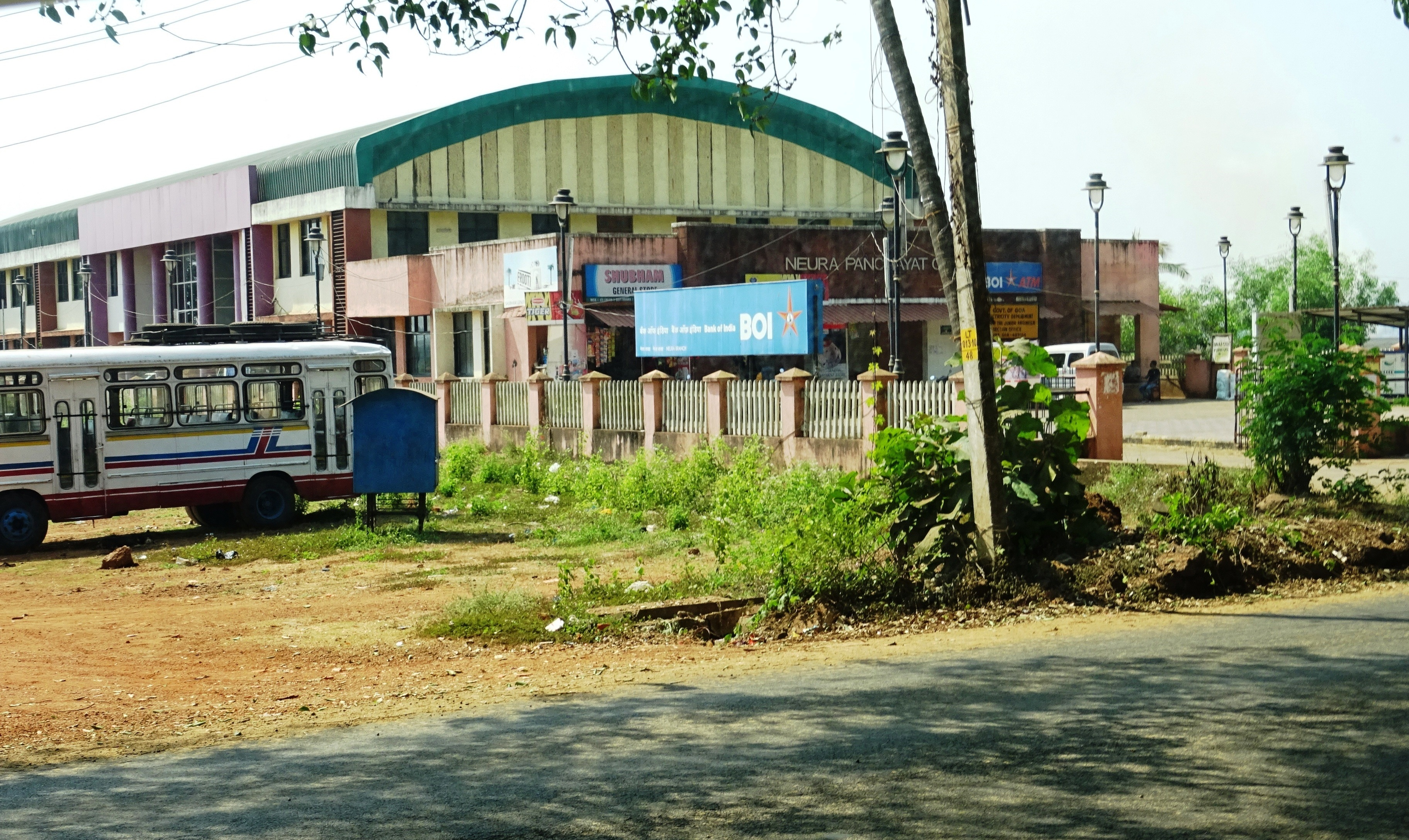
- Neura Panchayat Ghar (2017)

- Location within Goa Location within India
- Coordinates: 15°26′35.24″N 73°55′4.62″E
- Country: India
- State: Goa
- District: North Goa
- Sub-district: Tiswadi

Government
  - Type: Gram panchayat
  - Body: Village Panchayat
  - Member of Goa Legislative Assembly: Viresh Borkar (RGP)
  - Sarpanch: Usha Anand Naik
  - Deputy Sarpanch: Vinod Vaikunt Kamat

Area
  - Land: 28 km^{2} (11 sq mi)

Population (2018)
  - Total: 5,000
  - Density: 180/km^{2} (460/sq mi)
- Website: www.vpneura.com

Neura (Note: also referred to as Island of Neura.) (English: /njurɑː/; also known as Velakula – the official name until 1310 CE) is a village located in the Tiswadi taluka of Goa, India. The village boasts a historical heritage tracing back to the era of the Kadambas of Goa and is known for its collection of villas and mansions. During the reign of the Kadamba dynasty, the village was a bustling centre, primarily due to its Naval quarters. It was also a center for learned Brahmin-Sinais.

== History ==
=== Early history ===
In the era of the Kadamba dynasty, a port thrived near the present-day Agaçaim Beach. Remnants of the ancient port wall are still sometimes visible during low tides. The shipyards, which were the hub of shipbuilders and sailors of that period, were situated a short distance away in the village of Neura, known in those times as "Velakula". In the Gopaka plate inscription, it is documented that Jaykeshi I took action in AD 1052 by establishing a fleet at Velakula, a major port situated on the banks of the Zuari River. Velakula was a maritime trading hub that had historical connections with the Tajjika or Arab community, and it was governed by the Goa Shilaharas.

=== Portuguese period ===
In the historical annals predating Portuguese dominion, the village of Neura occupied a unique position within the region of Goa, owing to its strategic location between two ancient capitals, Gopakapattana and Velha Goa (Old Goa). Neura not only possessed expansive khazan lands, but it also encompassed two distinct gaunkarias or comunidade villages known as Neura-O-Grande and Neura-O-Pequeno. Additionally, the village had an important harbor.

=== Contemporary period ===
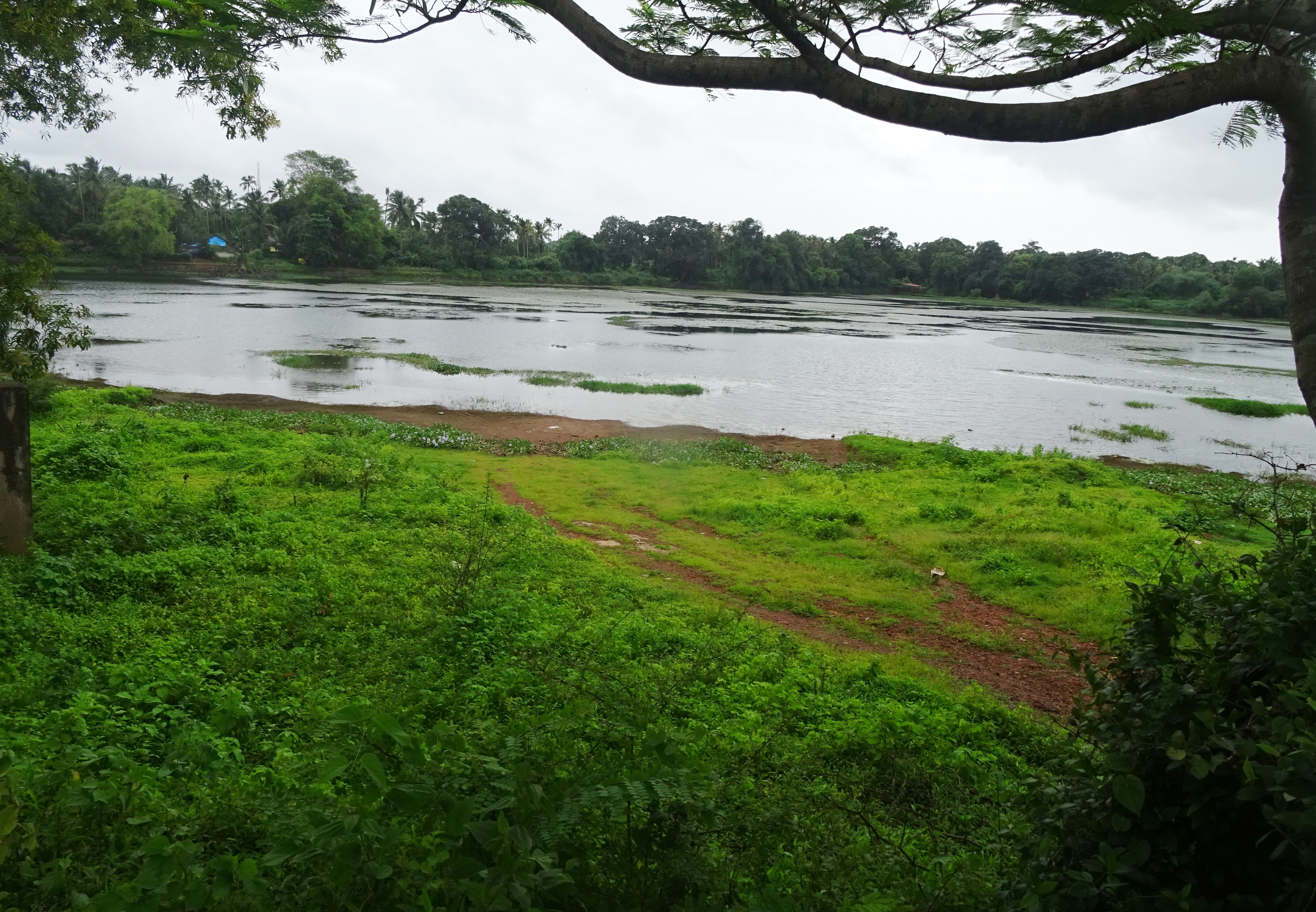
Sulabhat Lake in Agaçaim near Pilar-Neura road.

In the annals of Goa's history, the village played a significant role. Its contributions to agriculture have been chronicled throughout the years. However, according to local residents John and Maria Gonsalves from Guddivaddo, the advent of pisciculture brought about a drastic transformation that irreparably impacted Neura's agricultural pursuits.

Many residents expressed sadness over the negative impact of pisciculture, a practice adopted by a small group of individuals, on the village's agriculture. According to Vinod Kamat, the former sarpanch, the once rich agricultural fields of Neura, which covered an area of 10 km (6.2 mi), have been completely destroyed as a result of illegal and unlawful fishing activities taking place in the village.

Fr. Mousinho Athaide, the parish priest of St. John the Evangelist church, shared the sentiment of distress. He highlighted that in addition to the devastation caused to agriculture, Neura's khazans have also suffered major damage due to the lack of action taken by the panchayat and comunidades against those responsible for the wrongdoings.

== Etymology ==
Oscar de Noronha, a resident of Miramar and a native of Neura, expressed his belief regarding the origin of the term 'Neura.' In Noronha's view, the origins of the word can be traced back to the villagers' cultivation of a specific variety of rice called nevri. However, alternative theories propose that 'Neura' derived its name from navrak, which translates to 'town of boats.' This idea finds support in the historical context of the region, as the area known today as 'Velfali khazan' served as a safe harbor for ships during the Kadamba era.

== Geography ==
The village encompasses a land area spanning 28 square kilometers and serves as a residence for approximately 5,000 inhabitants. It shares its borders with the neighboring villas of Agasaim, Goa Velha, and Azossim-Mandur. Moreover, to the south lies the Zuari River.

== Wards ==
The village is organized into a village panchayat consisting of seven wards. Within these wards, known as vadde (singular: vaddo), Neura is further divided into distinct traditional village units. Some of these vadde include Shenvai-vaddo, Igorjevaddo, Padri Bhat, Shenkrem Bhat, Guddivaddo, Dhondea Bhat, Neura Pequeno, and Dev Bhat.

== Landmarks and education ==
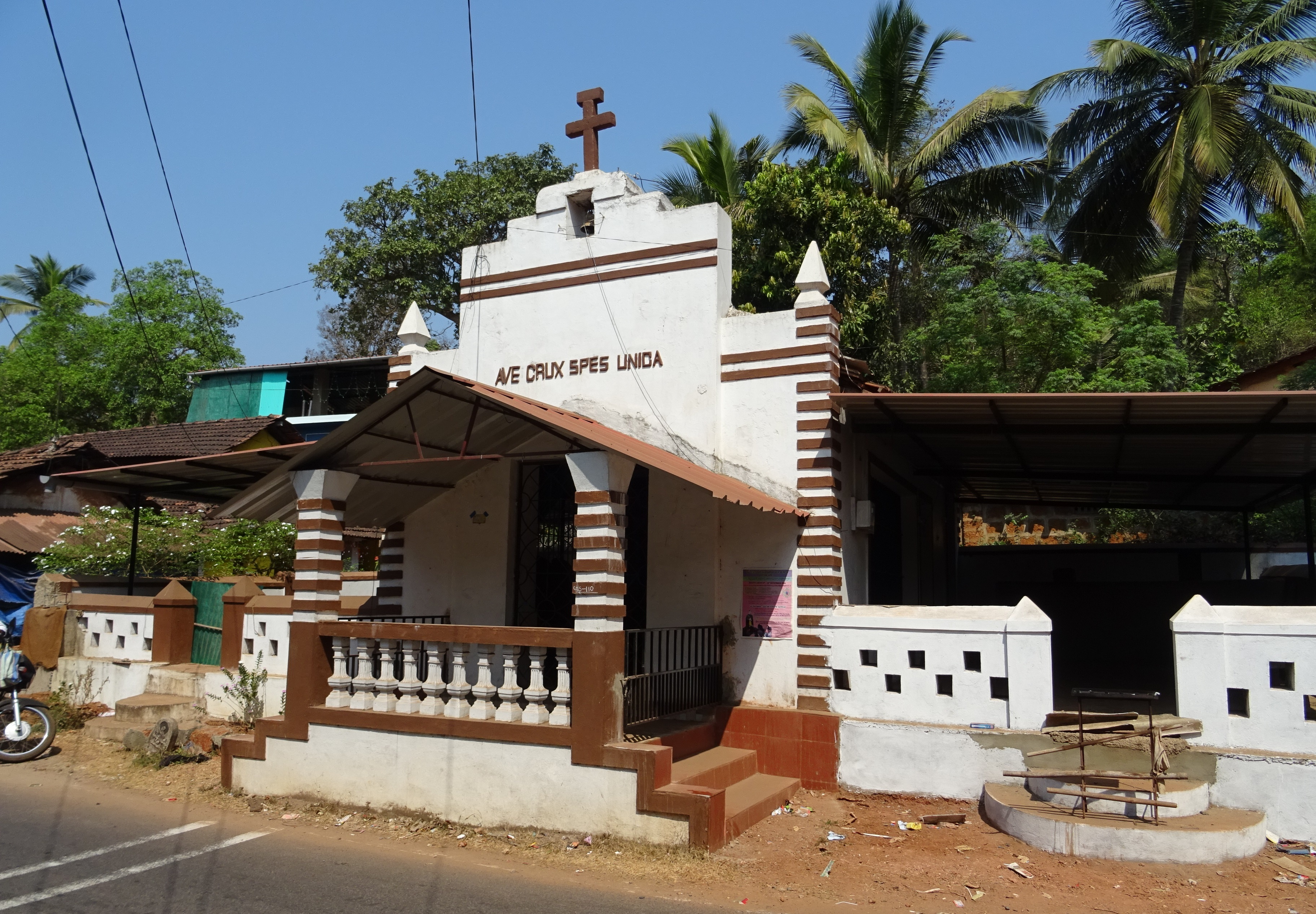
Ave crux spes unica chapel (2017)

Among the landmarks in Neura is the Shri Dhondeshwar Temple. The village is also home to two educational institutions, namely the Dayanand Arya High School and the Azmane High School.

== Architecture ==
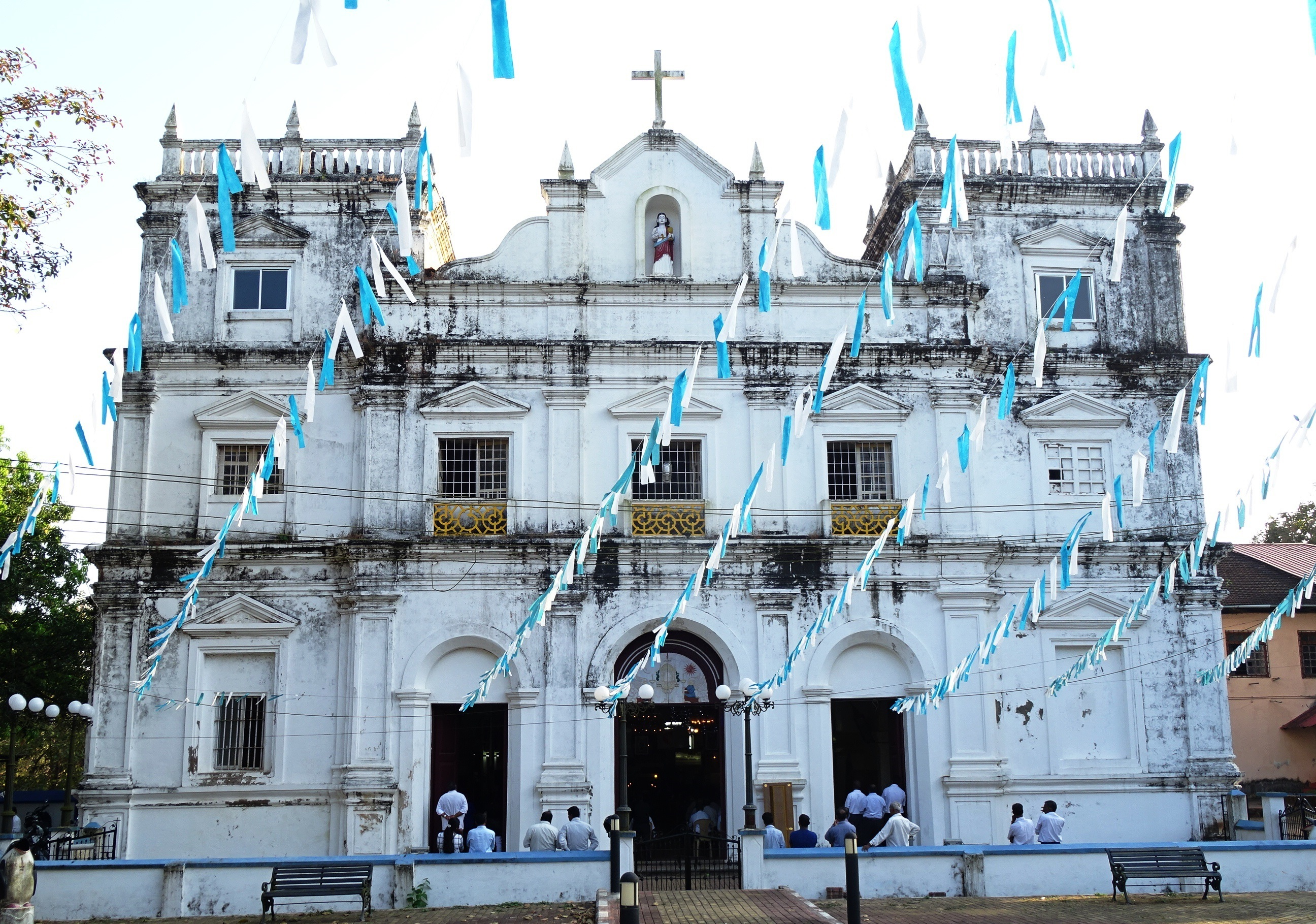
St. John the Evangelist Church (2015)

In close proximity to the ruins of the Ravalnath Temple, which suffered destruction during the Portuguese era, stands the historic Church of St. John the Evangelist, which was constructed between the years 1541 and 1542.

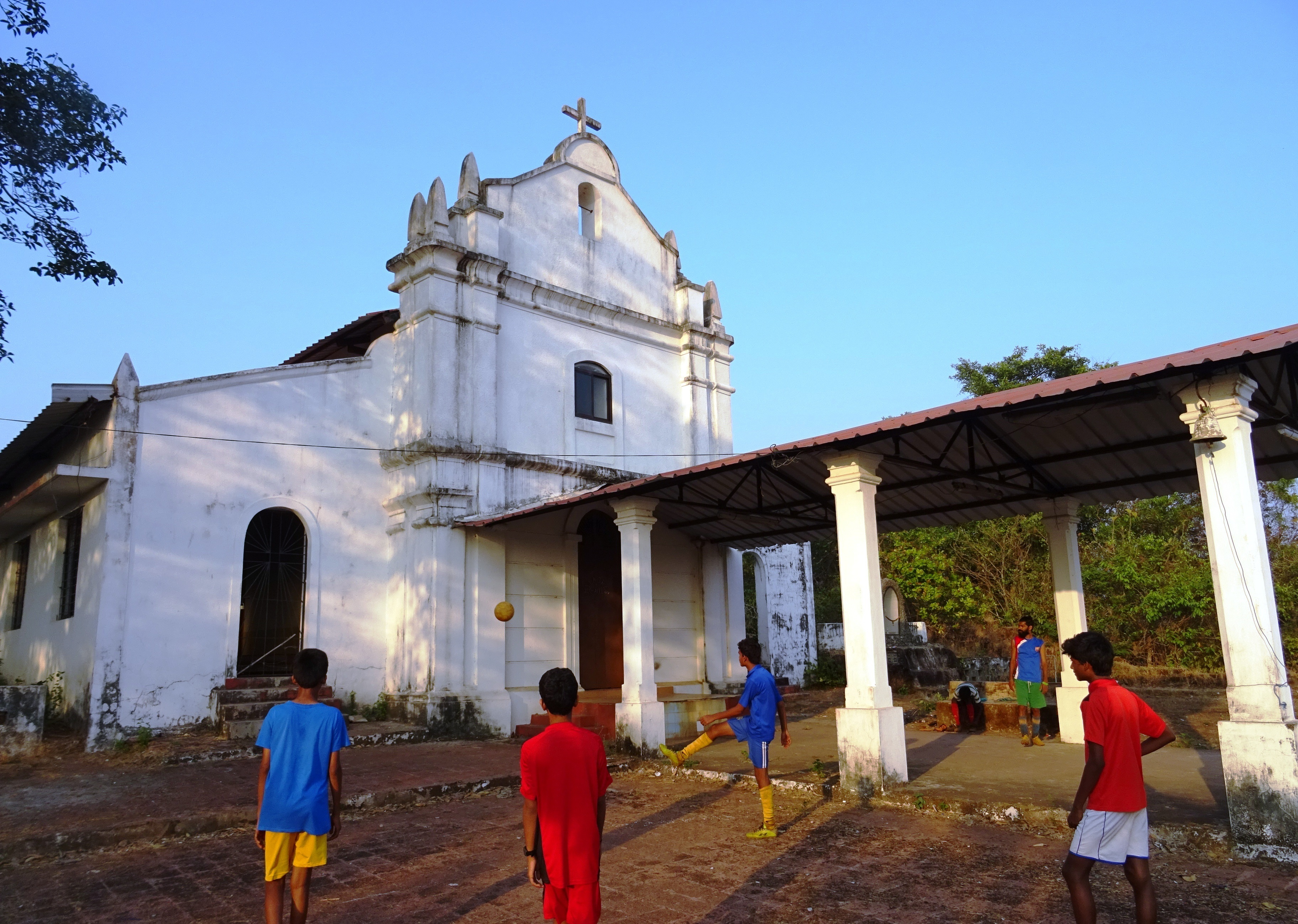
Our Lady of Miracles Chapel (2017)

Additionally, near the outskirts of Neura village, the St. Sebastian Chapel can be found, dating back to the 17th century, which is perched atop a hillock. Nearby is the chapel of Our Lady of Miracles which was constructed in 1796.

== Notable people ==
- Bernardo Peres da Silva (1775–1844) – 18th-century Portuguese politician and former medical practitioner, who served as the Governor of Portuguese India.
- Viresh Borkar – Indian politician and businessman, who currently serves as a member of the Goa Legislative Assembly, representing the St. Andre Assembly constituency.
