= List of colonial governors of Mozambique =

This is a list of European colonial administrators responsible for the territory of Portuguese Mozambique, an area equivalent to modern-day Republic of Mozambique.

Coat of arms of Portuguese Mozambique

== List ==
(Dates in italics indicate de facto continuation of office)

Tenure	Portrait	Incumbent	Notes
Portuguese suzerainty
Captaincy of Sofala	Under Portuguese India		
September 1505 to March 1506		Pero de Anaia, Captain-Major	Died in office
March 1506 to December 1506		Manuel Fernandes de Meireles, acting Captain-Major	Factor. Elected to temporarily replace Anaia
December 1506 to 8 September 1507		Nuno Vaz Pereira, Captain-Major	Appointed by D. Francisco de Almeida, viceroy of India
Captaincy of Sofala and Moçambique	Under Portuguese India		
8 September 1507 to February 1508		Vasco Gomes de Abreu, Captain-Major	Died in office
February 1508 to August 1509		Rui de Brito Patalim, acting Captain-Major	
August 1509 to 24 June 1512		António de Saldanha, Captain-Major	
24 June 1512 to June 1515		Simão de Miranda de Azevedo, Captain-Major	
June 1512 to July 1515		Sancho de Tovar, acting Captain-Major	1st term
July 1515 to June 1518		Cristóvão de Távora, Captain-Major	
June 1518 to July 1521		Sancho de Tovar, Captain-Major	2nd term
July 1521 to 1525		Diogo de Sepúlveda, Captain-Major	
1525 to 1528		Lopo de Almeida, Captain-Major	
1528 to 1531		António da Silveira de Meneses, Captain-Major	
1531 to 1538		Vicente Pegado, Captain-Major	
1538 to 1541		Alexio Chicorro, Captain-Major	
1541 to 1548		João de Sepúlveda, Captain-Major	
1548 to 1551		Fernão de Sousa de Távora, Captain-Major	
1551 to 1553		Diogo de Mesquita, Captain-Major	
1553 to 1557		Diogo de Sousa, Captain-Major	
1557 to 1560		Sebastião de Sá, Captain-Major	
1560 to 1564		Pantaleão de Sá, Captain-Major	
1564 to 1567		Jerónimo Barreto, Captain-Major	
1567 to 1569		Pedro Barreto Rolim, Captain-Major	
Captaincy-General of Moçambique
1569 to June 1573		Francisco Barreto, Captain-General	
June 1573 to 1577		Vasco Fernandes Homem, acting Captain-General	
1577 to 1577		Fernando Monroi, acting Captain-General	
1577 to 1577		Simão de Silveira, acting Captain-General	
1577 to 1582		Pedro de Castro, Captain-General	
1582 to 1586		Nuno Pereira, Captain-General	
1586 to 1589		Jorge Telo de Meneses, Captain-General	
1589 to 1590		Lourenço de Brito, Captain-General	
1590 to 1595		Pedro de Sousa, Captain-General	
1595 to 1598		Nuno da Cunha Ataíde, Captain-General	
1598 to 1601		Álvaro Abranches, Captain-General	
1601 to 1604		Vasco de Mascarenhas, Captain-General	
1604 to 1607		Sebastião de Macedo, Captain-General	
1607 to 1609		Estêvão de Ataíde, Captain-General	
Colony of Moçambique, Sofala, Río de Cuama, and Monomotapa	Under Portuguese India		
1609 to 1611		Nuno Álvares Pereira, Governor	1st term
1611 to 1612		Estêvão de Ataíde, Governor	
1612 to 1612		Diogo Simões de Madeira, acting Governor	
1612 to 1614		João de Azevedo, Governor	
1614 to 1618		Rui de Melo Sampaio, Governor	
1618 to 1623		Nuno Álvares Pereira, Governor	2nd term
1623 to 1624		Lopo de Almeida, Governor	
1624 to 1627		Diogo de Sousa de Meneses, Governor	1st term
1627 to 1631		Nuno Álvares Pereira, Governor	3rd term
1631 to 1632		Cristóvão de Brito e Vasconcelos, acting Governor	
1632 to 1633		Diogo de Sousa de Meneses, Governor	2nd term
1633 to 1634		Filipe Mascarenhas, Governor	
1634 to 1639		Lourenço de Souto-Maior, Governor	
1639 to 1640		Diogo de Vasconcelos, Governor	
1640 to 1641		António de Brito Pacheco, Governor	
1641 to 1642		Francisco da Silveira, Governor	
1642 to 1646		Júlio Moniz da Silva, Governor	
1646 to 1648		Fernão Dias Baião, Governor	
1648 to 1651		Álvaro de Sousa de Távora, Governor	
1651 to 1652		Francisco de Mascarenhas, Governor	
1652 to 1657		Francisco de Lima, Governor	
1657 to 1661		Manuel Corte-Real de Sampaio, Governor	
1661 to 1664		Manuel de Mascarenhas, Governor	
1664 to 1667		António de Melo e Castro, Governor	
1667 to 1670		Inácio Sarmento de Carvalho, Governor	
1670 to 1673		João de Sousa Freire, Governor	1st term
1673 to 1674		Simão Gomes da Silva, Governor	
1674 to 1674		André Pinto da Fonseca, Governor	
1674 to 1676		Manuel da Silva, acting Governor	
1676 to 1682		João de Sousa Freire, Governor	2nd term
1682 to 1686		Caetano de Melo e Castro, Governor	
1686 to 1689		Miguel de Almeida, Governor	
1689 to 1692		Manuel dos Santos Pinto, Governor	
1692 to 1693		Tomé de Sousa Correia, Governor	
1693 to 1694		Francisco Correia de Mesquita, acting Governor	
1694 to 1695		Estêvão José da Costa, Governor	
1695 to 1696		Francisco da Costa, Governor	
1696 to 1699		Luís de Melo Sampaio, Governor	
1699 to 1703		Jácome de Morais Sarmento, Governor	
1703 to 1706		João Fernandes de Almeida, Governor	1st term
1706 to 1708		Luís de Brito Freire, Governor	
1708 to 1712		Luís Gonçalves da Câmara, Governor	
1712 to 1714		João Fernandes de Almeida, Governor	2nd term
1714 to 1716		Francisco de Mascarenhas, Governor	
1716 to 1719		Francisco de Souto-Maior, Governor	
1719 to 1722		Francisco de Alarcão e Souto-Maior, Governor	
1722 to 1723		Álvaro Caetano de Melo e Castro, Governor	
1723 to 1726		António João Sequeira e Faria, Governor	
1726 to 1730		António Cardim Fróis, Governor	
1730 to 1733		António Casco de Melo, Governor	
1733 to 1736		José Barbosa Leal, Governor	
1736 to 1740		Nicolau Tolentino de Almeida, Governor	
1740 to 1743		Lourenço de Noronha, Governor	
1743 to 1746		Pedro do Rêgo Barreto da Gama e Castro, Governor	
1746 to 1750		Caetano Correia da Sá, Governor	
1750 to 1752		Francisco de Melo e Castro, Governor	
Colony of Moçambique, the Zambezi and Sofala
1752 to March 1758		Francisco de Melo e Castro, Governor	
March 1758 to April 1758		João Manuel de Melo, Governor	
April 1758 to 28 May 1759		David Marques Pereira, Governor	
28 May 1759 to January 1763		Pedro de Saldanha e Albuquerque, Governor	1st term
6 January 1763 to 1765		João Pereira da Silva Barba, Governor	
1765 to June 1779		Baltasar Manuel Pereira do Lago, Governor	
June 1779 to 1780	Provisional administration		
1780 to 1781		José de Vasconcelos e Almeida, Governor	
1781 to 4 January 1782		Vicente Caetano da Maria e Vasconcelos, acting Governor	
4 January 1782 to 21 August 1782		Pedro de Saldanha e Albuquerque, Governor	2nd term
21 August 1782 to 1786	Provisional administration		
1786 to 1793		António de Melo e Castro, Governor	
1793 to 1797		Diogo de Sousa Coutinho, Governor	
1797 to September 1801		Francisco Guedes de Carvalho Meneses da Costa, Governor	
September 1801 to August 1805		Isidro de Sousa e Sá, Governor	
August 1805 to December 1807		Francisco de Paula de Albuquerque do Amaral Cardoso, Governor	
December 1807 to 14 August 1809	Provisional administration		
14 August 1809 to August 1812		António Manuel de Melo e Castro de Mendonça, Governor	
August 1812 to February 1817		Marcos Caetano de Abreu e Meneses, Governor	
February 1817 to September 1818		José Francisco de Paula Cavalcanti de Albuquerque, Governor	
September 1818 to November 1819	Provisional administration		
November 1819 to June 1821		João da Costa M. Brito-Sanches, Governor	
June 1821 to June 1824	Provisional administration		
June 1824 to January 1825		João Manuel da Silva, Governor	
January 1825 to August 1829		Sebastião Xavier Botelho, Governor	
August 1829 to January 1832		Paulo José Miguel de Brito, Governor	
January 1832 to March 1834	Provisional administration		
March 1834 to March 1836		José Gregório Pegado, Governor	
Moçambique Colony/Portuguese East Africa
March 1836 to March 1837	Provisional administration		
March 1837 to October 1837		António José de Melo, Governor-General	
October 1837 to March 1838		João Carlos Augusto de Oeynhausen e Gravenburg, marquês de Aracaty, Governor-General	
March 1838 to 25 March 1840		Juiz A. de Ramalho de Sá, President of Governing Council	
25 March 1840 to May 1841		Joaquim Pereira Marinho, Governor-General	
May 1841 to 15 February 1843		João da Costa Xavier, Governor-General	
15 February 1843 to May 1847		Rodrigo Luciano de Abreu e Lima, Governor-General	
May 1847 to October 1851		Domingos Fortunato de Vale, Governor-General	
October 1851 to April 1854		Joaquim Pinto de Magalhães, Governor-General	
April 1854 to September 1857		Vasco Guedes de Carvalho e Meneses, acting Governor-General	
September 1857 to February 1864		João Tavares d'Almeida, Governor-General	
February 1864 to April 1864		Cândido M. Montes, President of Governing Council	
April 1864 to October 1867		M. António do Canto e Castro, Governor-General	
October 1867 to September 1868		António Augusto de Almeida Portugal Correia de Lacerda, Governor-General	
September 1868 to February 1869		M. N. P. de Ataíde e Azevedo, President of Governing Council	
February 1869 to April 1869		António Tavares de Almeida, Governor-General	
April 1869 to December 1869		Fernão da Costa Leal, Governor-General	
December 1869 to June 1870		Juiz E. K. da Fonseca e Gouveia, President of Governing Council	
June 1870 to August 1870		Inácio A. Alves, acting Governor-General	
August 1870 to December 1873		José Rodrigues Coelho do Amaral, Governor-General	
December 1873 to August 1874		Juiz J. M. Crispiniano da Fonseca, President of Governing Council	
August 1874 to December 1877		José Guedes de Carvalho e Meneses, Governor-General	
December 1877 to January 1880		Francisco Maria da Cunha, Governor-General	
January 1880 to August 1881		Augusto César Rodrigues Sarmento, acting Governor-General	
August 1881 to February 1882		Carlos Eugénio Correia da Silva, Count of Paço de Arcos, Governor-General	
February 1882 to April 1882		J. d'Almeida d'Avila, acting Governor-General	
April 1882 to April 1885		Agostinho Coelho, Governor-General	
April 1885 to July 1885		D. Henrique Real da Silva, President of Governing Council	
July 1885 to March 1889		Augusto Vidal de Castilho Barreto e Noronha, Governor-General	
March 1889 to July 1889		José Joaquim d'Almeida, acting Governor-General	
July 1889 to July 1890		José António de Brissac das Neves Ferreira, Governor-General	
July 1890 to 2 July 1891		Joaquim José Machado, Governor-General	1st term
2 July 1891 to May 1893		Rafael Jácome de Andrade, Governor-General	
May 1893 to 13 January 1894		Francisco Teixeira da Silva, Governor-General	
January 1894 to July 1894		Joaquim da Graça Correia e Lança, acting Governor-General	1st term
July 1894 to January 1895		Fernando de Magalhães e Menezes, Governor-General	
January 1895 to December 1895		António José Enes, Governor-General	
January 1896 to March 1896		Joaquim da Graça Correia e Lança, acting Governor-General	2nd term
March 1896 to November 1897		Joaquim Augusto Mouzinho de Albuquerque, Governor-General	
November 1897 to August 1898		Baltasar Freire Cabral, acting Governor-General	
August 1898 to December 1898		Carlos Alberto Schultz Xavier, Governor-General	
December 1898 to March 1900		Álvaro António Ferreira, Governor-General	
March 1900 to May 1900		Júlio José, marqués da Costa, Governor-General	
May 1900 to October 1900		Joaquim José Machado, Governor-General	2nd term
October 1900 to December 1902		Manuel Rafael Gorjão, Governor-General	
December 1902 to February 1905		Tomás António Garcia Rosado, Governor-General	
February 1905 to October 1906		João António de Azevedo Coutinho Fragoso de Sequeira, Governor-General	
October 1906 to November 1910		Alfredo Augusto Freire de Andrade, Governor-General	
November 1910 to May 1911		José de Freitas Ribeiro, acting Governor-General	
May 1911 to February 1912		José Francisco de Azevedo e Silva, Governor-General	
February 1912 to March 1913		José Alfredo Mendes de Magalhães, Governor-General	
March 1913 to April 1914		Augusto Ferreira dos Santos, Governor-General	
April 1914 to May 1915		Joaquim José Machado, Governor-General	3rd term
May 1915 to October 1915		Alfredo Baptista Coelho, Governor-General	
October 1915 to April 1918		Álvaro de Castro, Governor-General	
April 1918 to April 1919		Pedro Francisco Massano do Amorim, Governor-General	
April 1919 to March 1921		Manuel Juiz Moreira da Fonseca, acting Governor-General	1st term
March 1921 to September 1923		Manuel de Brito Camacho, High Commissioner and Governor-General	
September 1923 to November 1924		Manuel Juiz Moreira da Fonseca, acting High Commissioner and Governor-General	2nd term
November 1924 to May 1926		Victor Hugo de Azevedo Coutinho, High Commissioner and Governor-General	
May 1926 to November 1926		Artur Ivens Ferraz, acting High Commissioner and Governor-General	
November 1926 to April 1938		José Ricardo Pereira Cabral, High Commissioner and Governor-General	
April 1938 to 1941		José Nicolau Nunes de Oliveira, High Commissioner and Governor-General	
1941 to 1946		João Tristão de Bettencourt, High Commissioner and Governor-General	
May 1947 to December 1948		Luís de Sousa e Vasconcelos e Funchal, High Commissioner and Governor-General	
December 1948 to 11 June 1951		Gabriel Mauricio Teixeira, High Commissioner and Governor-General	
Mozambique Overseas Province of Portugal
11 June 1951 to 1958		Gabriel Maurício Teixeira, High Commissioner and Governor-General	
1958 to 1961		Pedro Correia de Barros, High Commissioner and Governor-General	
1961 to 1964		Manuel Maria Sarmento Rodrigues, High Commissioner and Governor-General	
1964 to 1968		José Augusto da Costa Almeida, High Commissioner and Governor-General	
12 July 1968 to 1970		Baltazar Rebelo de Sousa, High Commissioner and Governor-General	
1970 to 1972		Eduardo Arantes e Oliveira, High Commissioner and Governor-General	
1972 to 27 April 1974		Manuel Pimentel Pereira dos Santos, High Commissioner and Governor-General	
27 April 1974 to 11 June 1974		David Teixeira Ferreira, acting High Commissioner and Governor-General	
11 June 1974 to 17 August 1974		Henrique Soares de Melo, High Commissioner and Governor-General	
19 August 1974 to 12 September 1974		Jorge Ferro Ribeiro, acting High Commissioner and Governor-General	
12 September 1974 to 25 June 1975		Vítor Crespo, High Commissioner and Governor-General	
25 June 1975	Independence as People's Republic of Mozambique		

For continuation after independence, see: List of presidents of Mozambique

== See also ==
- History of Mozambique § Portuguese Mozambique (1498–1975)

== Sources ==
- https://rulers.org/rulm2.html#mozambique
- https://www.worldstatesmen.org/Mozambique.htm
- African States and Rulers, John Stewart, McFarland
- Guinness Book of Kings, Rulers & Statesmen, Clive Carpenter, Guinness Superlatives Ltd
- Heads of State and Government, 2nd Edition, John V da Graca, MacMillan Press 2000
