= Jeronimo Barreto =

Jeronimo Barreto may refer to:

- Captain-Major Jerónimo Barreto, colonial head of Mozambique 1564–1567
- Jerónimo Barreto, Bishop of the Roman Catholic Diocese of Funchal 1573–1585
- Cacau (Claudemir Jerônimo Barreto, born 1981), Brazilian-born German footballer
