= Dili Harbor Lighthouse =

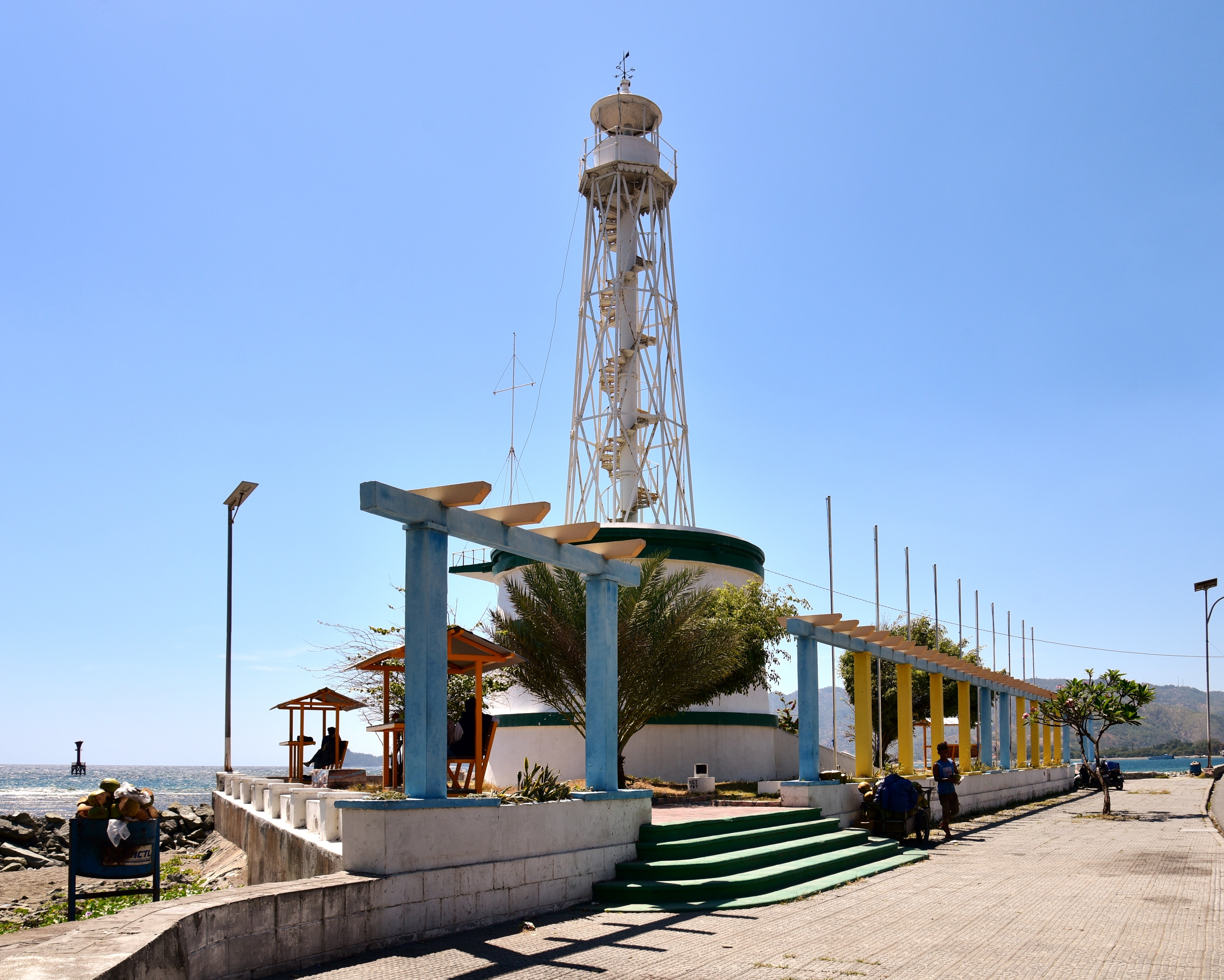
- Location: Dili, Dili Municipality, Timor-Leste
- Coordinates: 8°32′54″S 125°34′08″E

Tower
- Constructed: 1896
- Foundation: Masonry
- Construction: Metal
- Height: 19 m (62 ft)
- Shape: Octagonal
- Heritage: Heritage of Portuguese Influence

Light
- First lit: 1896
- Focal height: 17 m (56 ft)
- Range: 12 nmi (22 km; 14 mi)
- Characteristic: Fl W 6s

The Dili Harbor Lighthouse (Portuguese: Farol do Porto de Díli, Tetum: Farol Portu Díli)) is a lighthouse on the shore of the Bay of Dili next to the beach on the west side of Dili, capital city of Timor-Leste. It assists with navigation into and out of the Port of Dili.

== History ==
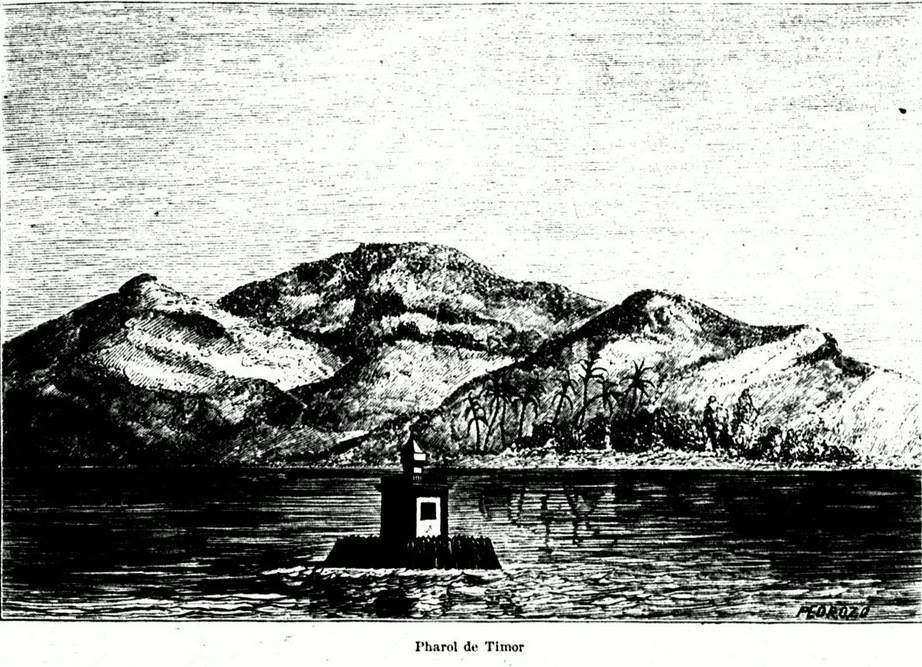
View of the earlier lighthouse, 1864 Credit: "Pharol de Timor", Archivo Pittoresco, Vol. X, 1867, p.325.

The lighthouse was erected to replace an earlier structure, which was only 7 m (23 ft) high, emitted a light that was blending with other lights of the city, and was already in danger of falling into ruin.

The date of construction of the earlier lighthouse is not known. However, there is evidence of studies during the tenure of José Manuel Pereira de Almeida as Governor of Portuguese Timor (1863–1864) for the construction of a lighthouse 3.75 m (12.3 ft) high. The studies depict a structure with a stone base, quadrangular mechanism, and an upper terrace with a cylindrical structure supporting the lamp.

Construction of the present lighthouse began in 1889, during the governorship of Rafael Jácome Lopes de Andrade (1888–1890). In that year, the masonry base was completed. Maps published in 1892 and 1893 document both lighthouses simultaneously.

The present lighthouse was completed in 1896, and has twice been reconstructed and improved: in 1932, and between 1948 and 1949 after the Japanese occupation of Portuguese Timor. The latter refurbishments included the landscaping of the lighthouse's platform.

In 1949, a nearby house, which had been built before the Japanese occupation on the other side of what is now the Avenida de Motael, was adapted to become the residence of the lighthouse keeper.

In the early 1950s, the adjacent area, informally named "Bairro do Farol", was developed in accordance with the 1951 General Urban Plan of Díli, as a residential area for high level colonial public servants and Europeans.

== Architecture and fittings ==
Currently, the lighthouse consists of a 17 m (56 ft) octagonal metal skeletal tower rising from a massive masonry base, with a lantern and gallery at its peak. Access to the lantern is by an exposed stairway spiralling around a central column.

== See also ==
- List of lighthouses in Timor-Leste
