= List of lighthouses in Timor-Leste =

This is a list of lighthouses in East Timor.

== Lighthouses ==
Name	Image	Year built	Location & coordinates	Class of light	Height	NGA number	Admiralty number	Range nml
Dili Harbor Lighthouse		1896	Dili; 8°32′53.9″S 125°34′07.4″E	Fl W 6s.	19 metres (62 ft)	25708	K1368	12
Oecusse Lighthouse		n/a	Oecusse; 9°11′18.2″S 124°23′32.5″E	Fl W 4s.	31 metres (102 ft)	25702	K1367	16

== See also ==
- Lists of lighthouses and lightvessels
