= Francisco Maria da Cunha =

Portuguese colonial administrator

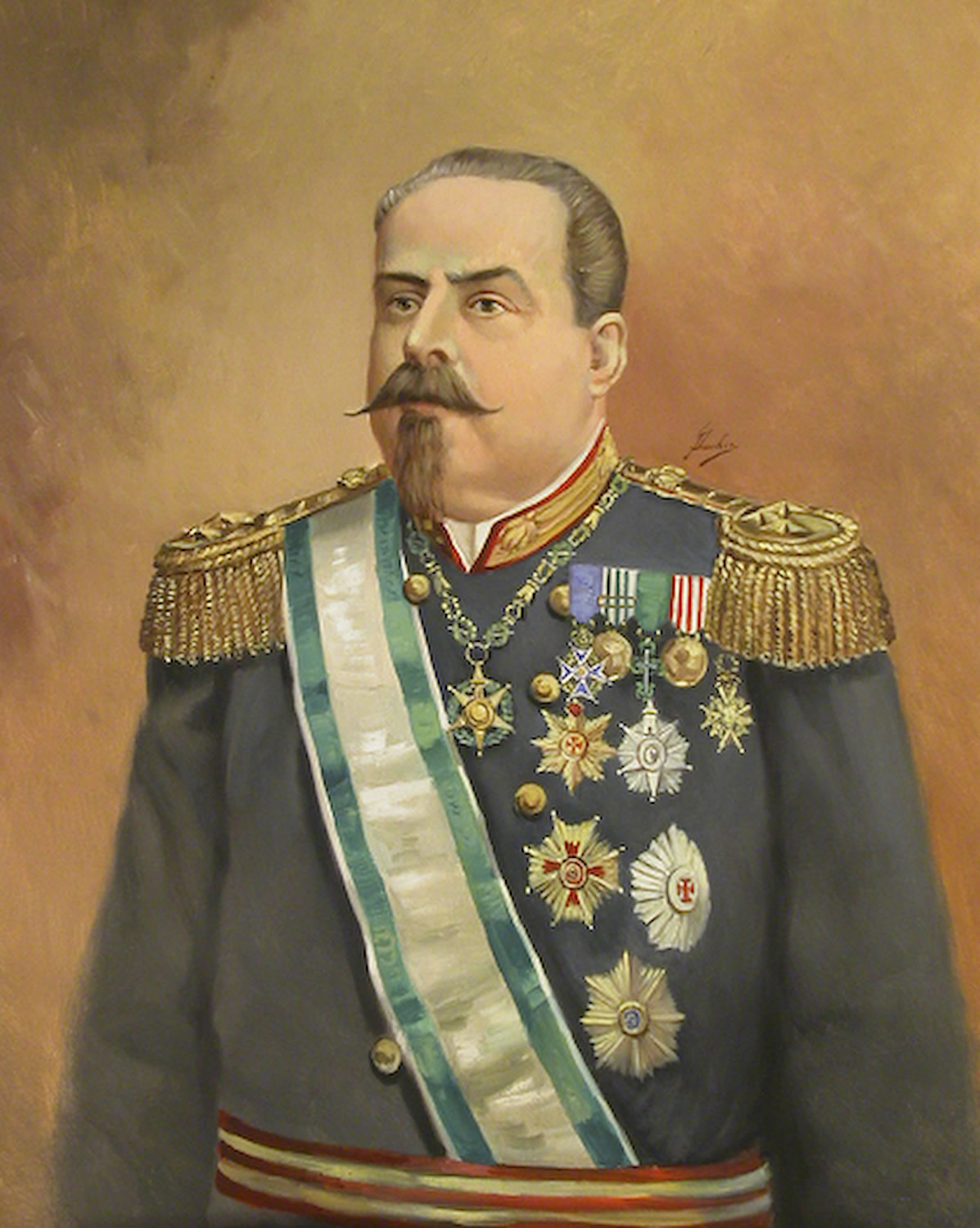
- General of the Division of Francisco Maria da Cunha.

Governor-general of Mozambique
- In office 1877–1880
- Preceded by: José Guedes de Carvalho e Meneses
- Succeeded by: Augusto César Rodrigues Sarmento

Governor of Portuguese India
- In office 1891–1891
- Preceded by: Vasco Guedes de Carvalho e Meneses
- Succeeded by: João Manuel Correia Taborda

Personal details
- Born: 22 December 1832 Angra do Heroísmo, Velas, Azores, Portugal
- Died: 13 January 1909 (aged 76) Lisbon, Portugal

Francisco Maria da Cunha GCA ComTE ComC (Angra do Heroísmo, 22 December 1832 – Lisbon, 13 January 1909) was a military, political and Portuguese colonial administrator. Among other prominent roles, he was Governor of Portuguese India and Governor-general of Portuguese Mozambique, deputy and Peer of the realm.

== Biography ==
He was born at Fortress of São João Baptista (Angra do Heroísmo), son of Maria Cândida da Franca e Horta and Francisco Jacques da Cunha, one of the Bravos do Mindelo (winners of the Portuguese liberal wars to members of the liberal forces that participated in the Landing at Mindelo) and then major general. He attended the military school between 1842 and 1848, and after this, at 16 years old, joined the Portuguese Army as a volunteer. After attending the Polytechnic School of Lisbon and the Army School (Escola do Exército), on 11 October 1865 he was promoted to lieutenant and began his career as an officer of Infantry.

As an Army officer, he served in the Portuguese colonies of Africa and Oceania. In 1869 he was appointed commander of the Macau Battalion. In 1877 he was appointed Governor-General of Mozambique, a post he held until 1880. During his administration, he dealt effectively with a revolt in Zambezia and took possession of Inhaca, drawing praise from the Portuguese and British governments. In 1891, he was appointed Governor General of Portuguese India, a position he held until 1892.

He was directory of the Military College from 1882 to 1890 or from 1883 to 1891. Between 1888 and 1890 was president of the Geographical Society of Lisbon. On 10 January 1895 he reached the rank of general of the division. In 1899, he was appointed commander of the Superior Council of the Army Discipline.

He was also Minister of War (1897) and 1st Secretary of the Chairman of José Luciano de Castro (1898); commander of the Army School (now Military Academy, 1895/96 and 1898/1900); Chief of the Military House, Council aide and member of Conselho de Sua Majestade Fidelíssima of King D. Carlos; President of the Portuguese Red Cross (1905/1909), the Montepio Geral and the Lisbon Geographical Society.

He was awarded the degree of Grand Cross of the Order of Aviz and the Commander of the Order of the Tower and Sword and the Order of Christ (Portugal).

| Preceded by José Guedes de Carvalho e Meneses | Governor-general of Mozambique; 1877-80 | Succeeded by Augusto César Rodrigues Sarmento |
| Preceded by Col. Joaquim António Dias | Director of the Military College; 1882/83-1890/91 | Succeeded by Ten.-Col. Emílio Henrique Xavier Nogueira |
| Preceded by Vasco Guedes de Carvalho e Meneses | Governor of Portuguese India; 1891 | Succeeded by João Manuel Correia Taborda |
