= Garcia de Noronha =

Portuguese nobleman and viceroy (1479–1540)

Dom Garcia de Noronha
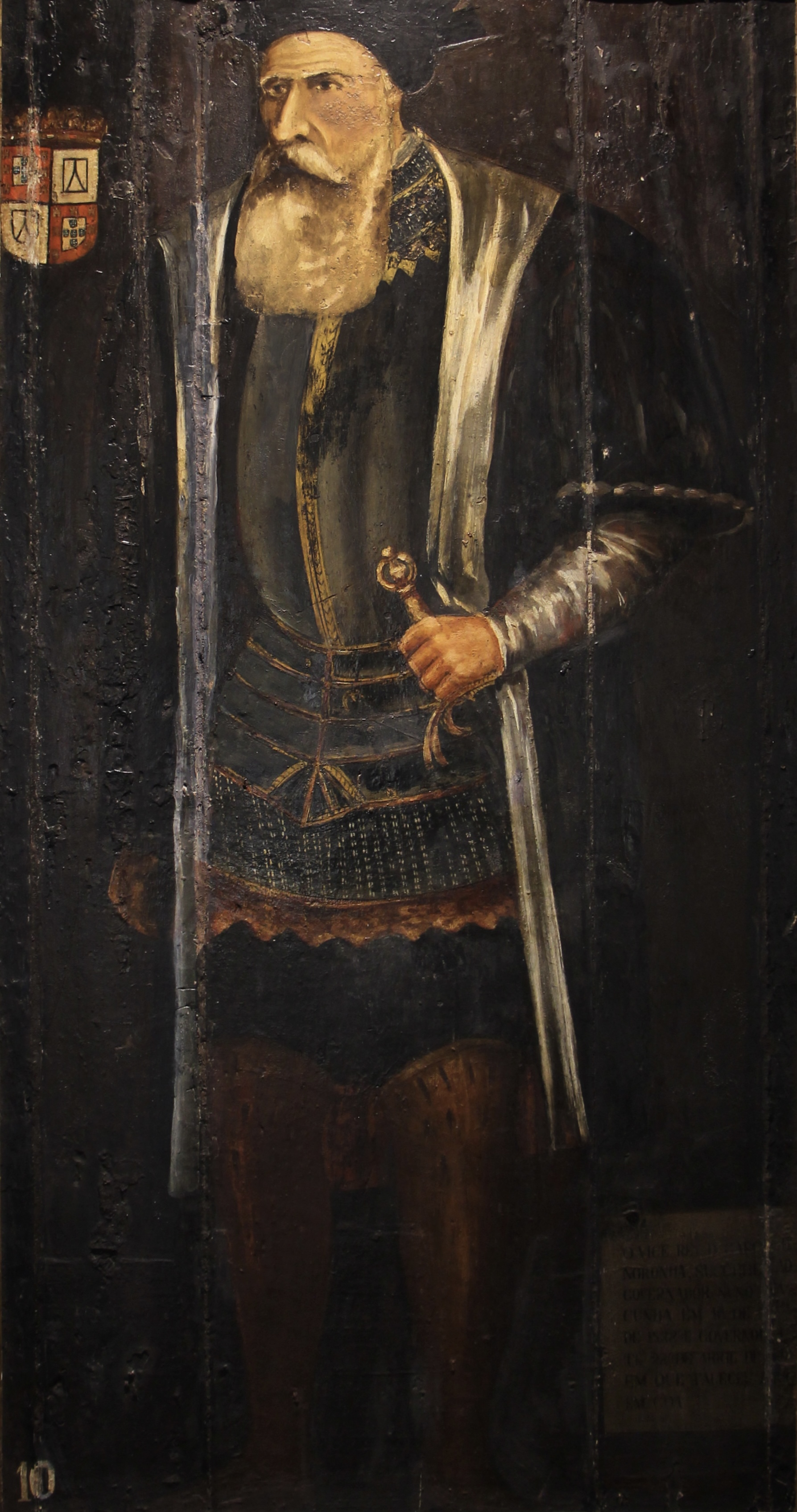

Viceroy of India
- In office 1538 – 3 April 1540
- Monarch: John III
- Preceded by: Nuno da Cunha
- Succeeded by: Estêvão da Gama

Personal details
- Born: 1479 Lisbon, Portugal
- Died: 3 April 1540 (aged 60–61) Cochin, India
- Spouse: Inês de Castro
- Children: 4
- Parent: Fernando de Noronha (father)

Military service
- Allegiance: Kingdom of Portugal
- Branch/service: Portuguese Navy
- Rank: Captain-major

Dom Garcia de Noronha (1479 – 3 April 1540) was a Portuguese nobleman. A great-great-grandson of King Ferdinand I of Portugal, he was the third viceroy and tenth governor of Portuguese India.

== Life ==
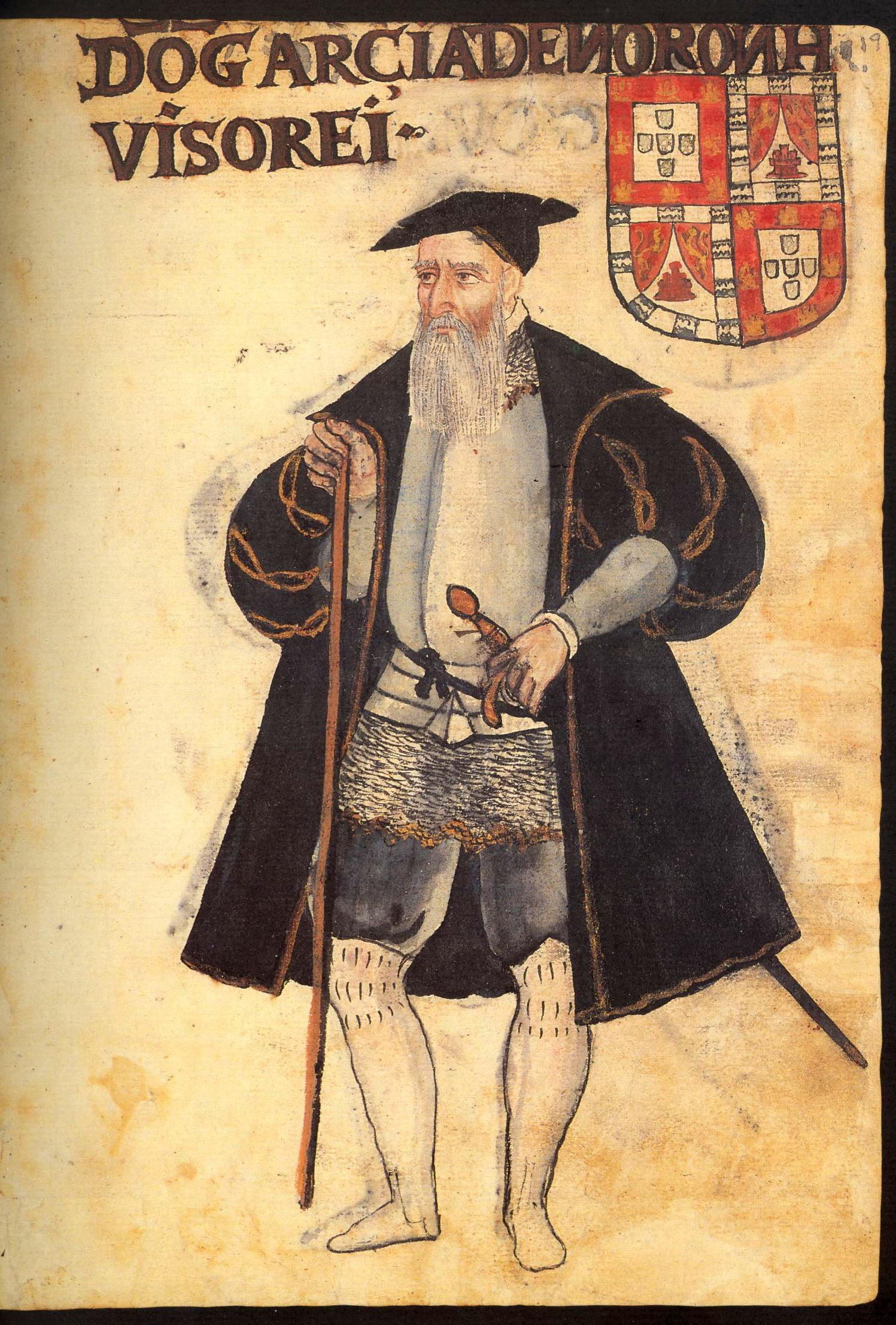
Portrait of D. Garcia de Noronha in Livro de Lisuarte de Abreu, c. 1560

As far as his life is reconstructed, Garcia de Noronha came from a noble family. His father, Dom Fernando de Noronha, was a member of the Crown Council of Portugal as mayor of the palace. As a young nobleman, he regularly frequented the royal court. After the death of his father, he became a gentleman of the Board of Manuel I and João III, captain-general of Cartaxo, young nobleman and knight of the royal house.

He served in North Africa and went to India for the first time in 1511 as chief captain of a fleet of six ships. On that voyage, according to the contemporary chronicler Gaspar Correia, he is reported to have sighted and named the island of Saint Helena, that his pilots entered onto their charts. This last source claimed that this event was decisive in leading to the utilisation of the island as a regular stopover for rest and replenishment for ships en route from India to Europe. However, this seems doubtful because when Estêvão da Gama arrived at St Helena expedition in 1503 his clerk Thomé Lopes) identified St Helena's geographic position with reasonable accuracy when he quoted its distance and direction with respect to locations such as Ascension, Cape Verde, São Tomé and the Cape of Good Hope. The island's location with respect to Ascension and the Cape of Good Hope was likewise known following the 1505 Portuguese expedition led by Francisco de Almeida.

He was married to Inês de Castro (a sister of D. João de Castro who was later to become the fourth viceroy of Portuguese India); with her he had four children. Moreover, he was a nephew of Afonso de Albuquerque.

He was a successor to the governor-general Nuno da Cunha, nominated by a royal decree of 18 March 1538 as viceroy of Estado da Índia by King John III. The King gave him the title of viceroy, and not just governor-general, in order to impress the Ottoman power that at the time threatened Portuguese possessions in Asia.

In September 1538 he landed in India. During his reign he promoted the settlement of missionaries on Celebes Islands and Macassar. He issued a temporary ban on the construction of mainly Hindu and Buddhist temples within Portuguese India.

Dom Garcia died before the end of his mandate as viceroy on April 3, 1540, in Cochin and is buried in the chancel of the Cathedral of Goa.

In Cascais (São Domingos de Rana) a street is named after him.

== See also ==
- List of governors of Portuguese India
