= Francisco Barreto =

Portuguese colonial governor

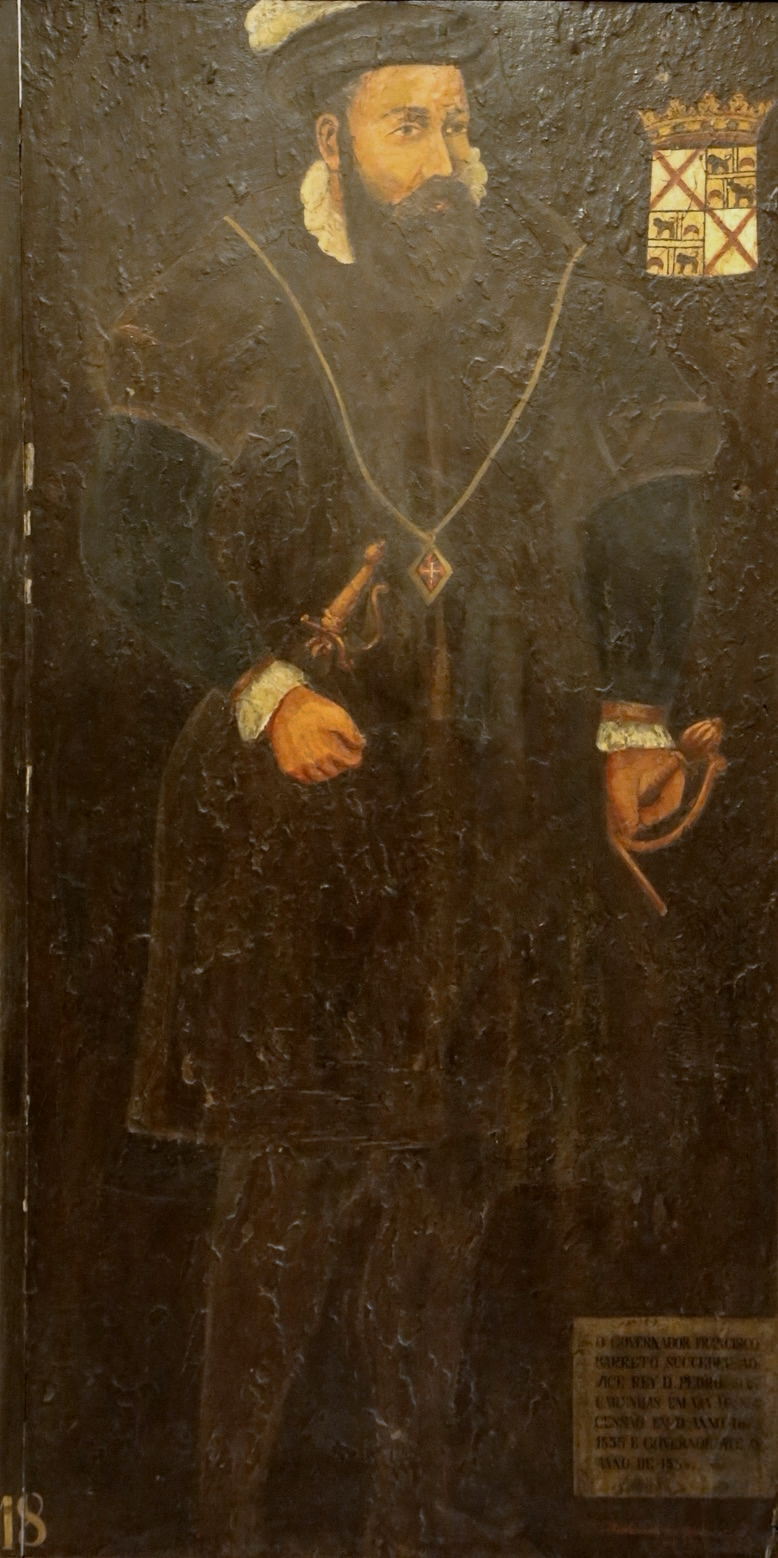

Governor of India
- In office 1555–1558
- Monarchs: John III; Sebastian
- Preceded by: Pedro Mascarenhas
- Succeeded by: Constantino de Bragança

Personal details
- Born: 1520 Faro, Kingdom of Portugal
- Died: 9 July 1573 (aged 52–53) Portuguese Mozambique
- Spouse: Brites de Ataíde

Francisco Barreto (occasionally Francisco de Barreto, 1520 – 9 July 1573) was a Portuguese soldier and explorer. An officer in Morocco during his early life, Barreto sailed to Portuguese India and was eventually appointed viceroy of the colony. After his return to Lisbon, he was tasked with an expedition to southeast Africa in search of legendary gold mines. Barreto died in what is now Mozambique, having never reached the mines.

== Early life ==
Born in Faro in 1520, Barreto was the second son of Rui Barreto, an influential nobleman, and Branca de Vilhena. He received military training in Morocco, and eventually served in Azemmour, near Casablanca.

== Career in Portuguese India ==
Coat of arms of the Portuguese colony of Goa

Barreto was appointed captain of a large fleet by John III and embarked for Portuguese India on 16 November 1547. He served as captain of Bassein from 1549 to 1552. He gradually gained influence at the viceregal court, securing several prominent nominations.

=== Governor ===
Barreto took up the position of viceroy in Goa, headquarters of the colony, in June 1555, following the death of viceroy Pedro Mascarenhas. On the occasion of his investiture, a play by Luís de Camões, Auto de Filodemo, was put on. Barreto later ordered Camões exiled to Macau (also a Portuguese colony) for his satirical Disparates da Índia, which criticized Portuguese life in India.

During his tenure as governor, the intended Catholic Patriarch for Ethiopia arrived, accompanied by an embassy led by Fernando de Sousa de Castello Branco, on 15 March 1556. Because he had more accurate information on matters in that country, Barreto held back most of this party, although allowing Bishop André de Oviedo to continue with some companions. This small group, carried in four small ships, landed at Arqiqo in March 1557, shortly before the Ottoman Empire occupied that port.

According to Robert Kerr in A General History and Collection of Voyages and Travels, Mascarenhas, in a bid to gain a Portuguese ally in the region, had supported a usurper against one Adel Khan, King of Visapur. Mascarenhas died shortly after sending soldiers to aid in the usurper's takeover, and Barreto continued Portuguese support of the usurper until his capture. In 1557, Barreto clashed with Khan's army at Ponda and was victorious.

Barreto also involved in negotiations for a peaceful acquisition of Daman, but they failed. He was more successful in defeating the Rajah of Calicut and in preparing a huge fleet to be sent against the Aceh sultanate. His departure there was halted with the arrival of a new ruler.

== Return to Lisbon ==
Succeeded by Constantino de Bragança in 1558, Barreto left Goa for Lisbon aboard the Águia on 20 January 1559. After a damaging storm, she was repaired in what is now Mozambique and set sail again on 17 November the same year. Soon after she sprang a leak, and returned to the African coast.

Barreto returned to Goa on a different boat, almost dying of thirst on the trip. Once back he again set sail for Lisbon, this time on the São Gião. Barreto reached the Portuguese capital in June 1561, 29 months after he first left Goa. He was very well received by Queen Catherine of Austria, the regent of Portugal.

In 1564, King Philip II of Spain requested Portuguese naval aid in capturing Peñón de Vélez de la Gomera, an island off the coast of Morocco. Portugal supplied and Barreto commanded a fleet consisting of a galleon and eight caravels alongside Spaniard García de Toledo, and the combined navy took over the island's fort in two days. After this, Philip II sent a personal letter and a medallion with his portrait to Barreto.

== Expedition to Monomotapa ==
After Barreto's return to Portugal, King Sebastian gave him the job of leading an expedition to Monomotapa (Great Zimbabwe) to take over the empire's legendary gold mines. According to historian Diogo de Couto, the reason for the expedition was that Portuguese mercantilists thought that the country needed mines to bring in gold similar to Spain's in the Americas (the country's colonies in Asia were not bringing sufficient wealth back to Portugal). Barreto was given instructions to "undertake nothing of importance without the advice and concurrence" of Jesuit Francisco Monclaros.

Barreto set sail from Lisbon on 16 April 1569, with three ships, 2,000 men, and the title of Conqueror of the Mines, bestowed upon him by the king. The first boat arrived in Mozambique in August 1569, Barreto's on 14 March the next year, and the third ship months later. Although Barreto opted to take the easier route, via Sofala, to the location of the mines, Monclaros demanded that the expedition take the Sena route, as this would lead them to where another Jesuit, Gonçalo da Silveira, had been thrown into a river and killed in 1561. So the expedition set out for Manica, the reputed location of the great mines, via the Sena route.

The expedition sailed up the Cuama river in November 1571, armed with weapons and mining tools, and arrived in the Sena region on 18 December. Barreto sent an envoy to the Emperor of Monomotapa with a request for permission to attack a people called the Mongas, whose territory lay between the Portuguese and the mines. The emperor granted Barreto permission to attack them and even went so far to offer his own men. Barreto, however, declined assistance and marched onward upriver.

The Portuguese fought several battles against the Mongas, emerging victorious due to their guns. According to Kerr, when their king sent ambassadors to Barreto in hopes of securing peace, the soldier tricked them into thinking that the camels used by the Portuguese, creatures foreign to southeastern Africa, subsisted on flesh, leading the Mongas to provide the Portuguese with beef for the camels.

Before the expedition could further progress Barreto was recalled to the Island of Mozambique to deal with one António Pereira Brandão, who was spreading false information about Barreto. The governor removed him from duty as commander of the São Sebastião fort and returned to Sena where his men were waiting. At this point, however, many of the men were sick with tropical diseases, and Barreto too fell ill. He died at Sena on 9 July 1573, having never reached the mines, and was buried at the Igreja de São Lourenço in Lisbon alongside his wife, Brites de Ataíde.

== Homem continues the search ==
Barreto's deputy, Vasco Fernandes Homem, succeeded him as governor and returned with the remaining company to the coast. After Monclaros had left for Lisbon, the expedition to Manica was resumed via the Sofala route. The mines, when finally reached, did not resemble the legends, with the natives only producing very small amounts of gold. After further failure looking for different mines in a neighbouring kingdom, Homem abandoned the search for gold.

== Bibliography ==
- Branco, Alberto M. Vara (1997). "Ensaio de Portugalidem Terras Africanas durante a Governação d´El-Rei D.Sebastião: D.Francisco Barreto em Moçambique e na Região do Monomotapa". Millennium (in Portuguese) (5). Polytechnic Institute of Viseu.
- Diffie, Bailey W.; Winius, George D. (1977). "The Shape of Empire: The Western Periphery". Foundations of the Portuguese Empire, 1415-1580. Europe and the World in the Age of Expansion. University of Minnesota Press. p. 347. ISBN 978-0-8166-0782-2.
- Kerr, Robert, ed. (1812). "Conquest of India". A General History and Collection of Voyages and Travels. Edinburgh: William Blackwood.
- Téllez, Baltazar (2010) [1710]. The Travels of the Jesuits in Ethiopia. LaVergue: Kessinger.
- Theal, George McCall (1902). "Knowledge derived from Shipwrecks". The Beginning of South African History. London: T. Fisher Unwin.
- Vila-Santa, Nuno (2017). "Counter-Reformation Policies versus Geostrategic Politics in the "Estado da India": the case of Governor Francisco Barreto (1555-1558)". Journal of Asian History. 51 (2): 189–222. doi:10.13173/jasiahist.51.2.0189.
- Vila-Santa, Nuno (2016). "Between Mission and Conquest: a review on Francisco Barreto´s expedition to Mutapa (1569-1573)". Portuguese Studies Review. 24 (1): 51–90.

Government offices
Preceded by Pedro Mascarenhas	Viceroy of Portuguese India; June 1555 – 1558	Succeeded by Constantino de Bragança
Preceded by Pedro Barreto Rolim	Captain-general of Moçambique; 1569 – June 1573	Succeeded by Vasco Fernandes Homem
