= Bernardo Peres da Silva =

Governor of Portuguese India from 1835 to 1835

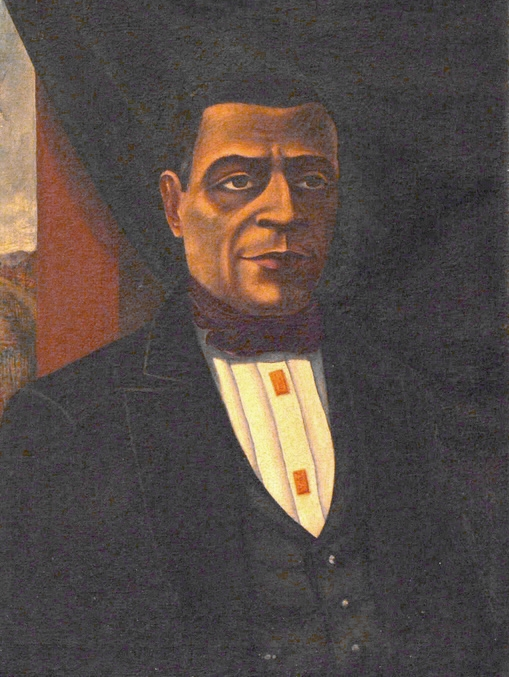
- Official portrait, 1835

Governor of Portuguese India
- In office 14 January 1835 – 1 February 1835
- Monarch: Maria II of Portugal
- Preceded by: Manuel Francisco Zacarias de Portugal e Castro
- Succeeded by: Manuel Francisco Zacarias de Portugal e Castro

Personal details
- Born: 15 October 1775 Neura, Goa, Portuguese India
- Died: 18 November 1844 (aged 69) Lisbon, Kingdom of Portugal
- Resting place: Cemitério dos Prazeres

Bernardo Peres da Silva (15 October 1775 – 18 November 1844), also known by the initialism BPS, was a Portuguese politician and former medical practitioner who served as a governor of Portuguese India from January to February 1835. He was the first and only native Goan to be appointed to this post during the 451 years of Portuguese colonial and provincial governance. He was also one of the first elected representatives in the Portuguese Parliament from its overseas Indian colonies.

== Early life ==
Bernardo Peres da Silva was born in Neura Island in Goa to José Tomás de Vila Nova Peres and Mariana Veloso and was orphaned at a very young age. His uncle, Caetano Peres, was a Catholic Christian priest at Rachol Seminary, and took him under his care. He completed secondary education at Rachol. He graduated from Escola Médico-Cirúrgica de Goa (School of Medical Surgery of Goa), which was attached to the Royal Hospital at Panelim. Bernardo Peres da Silva was a Christian.

== Medical practitioner ==
After completing his education at the medical school, Peres was appointed as substitute professor in the medical school, having passed a competitive exam. When his teacher fell ill, Peres took up the job of teaching.

During his term at the hospital, Peres opposed moves by the Viceroy, the Count of Rio Pardo, to streamline treatment available to patients. This made him popular with the people, but not with the viceroy. In 1820 he was dismissed from the Royal Hospital.

== Political career ==
=== The first insurrection ===
In 1821, Portugal issued a royal decree accepting constitutionalism. Rogério de Faria, a Goan businessman in Bombay and a friend or relative of Peres,), sent a copy to Peres. The events in Portugal inspired the Goans to seek greater political liberty. The Portuguese Viceroy of Goa, the Count of Rio Pardo, did not hold elections immediately, preferring, instead to wait for instructions from the Government Council in Rio de Janeiro. Peres led a popular insurrection in Goa that overthrew and imprisoned the Viceroy. Peres was offered a position in the provisional government but he refused.

=== First term as representative ===
The Goans now had an opportunity to vote representatives to the Portuguese Parliament. Portuguese officials supported mestiço candidates, but the Goans voted for their own. Peres participated in the elections and was voted to the Parliament in Lisbon, on 4 January 1822. Peres, along with Constâncio Roque da Costa and Dr. A. J. Lima Leitão (a Portuguese), became the first Goans in the Portuguese Parliament.

On the way to Portugal, the three representatives were detained in Portuguese Mozambique. By the time they reached Lisbon, the Parliament had been dissolved, and the absolute monarchy restored. The new government appointed Peres as Intendente Geral da Agricultura da India, but did not give immediate effect to his appointment. During his first term, Peres sided with the liberals in Portugal.

=== Second term ===
In 1827, after a new liberal government was established, elections were held again. This time, Peres's opponent was the Governor of Goa. Peres won again, but on reaching Lisbon found that the parliament had been dissolved by King Dom Miguel. He went to Plymouth in England. During his stay there, he came to know that someone else had been appointed in his place as representative. Peres published a strongly worded letter protesting this move. After staying there for some time, he went to Rio de Janeiro in Brazil. In order to survive, he started giving private tuition. During his stay at Janeiro, Peres wrote a book titled Dialógo entre um Doutor em Filosofia e um Português na Índia sobre a Constituição Política de Portugal (Dialogue between a Doctor of Philosophy and a Portuguese in India on the Political Constitution of Portugal).

=== Appointment as Prefect ===
Peres's son was serving in the Portuguese military. In 1834, he was part of an expeditionary force that took over Porto. A new constitutional monarchy was established with Prince Pedro as the regent of his daughter, Queen Maria II. Peres immediately left for Lisbon, where he submitted a memorandum to Pedro IV, pleading for greater liberties for the people of Portuguese India. For his son's participation, and his loyalty to the House of Braganza during the usurpation by Dom Miguel, Dona Maria II rewarded him by appointing Bernardo as Prefeito (Prefect) of Portuguese India on 7 May 1834. The post of Prefect was a new designation for the post of Governor, but it did not carry any military powers.

=== Prefect of Goa ===
Bernardo da Silva arrived in Goa on 10 January 1835, and took charge of his post on 14 January. The Goans were very happy that one of them had been appointed Governor. The whites and mestiços, however, were unhappy with Peres's appointment.

He intended to clean up the administration of Goa. Within a week of arrival, Peres's brought new reforms and made new appointments to the Finance and Justice departments. He took some steps to benefit locals which irked the whites and mestiços. One of the first measures he took was to form a new city council. The members of the council were Manuel Correia da Silva e Gama, Brigadier José António de Melo Souto, and Major D. Teles José Maria de Castro e Almeida. He also reorganised the judicial services and abolished monastic orders. He made concessions to the communidades by removing the tax that they had to pay to the state, amounting to one-sixth of their income. He also tried to end the abuses by the privileged classes.

=== Deposition ===
The army in Goa at that time was dominated by whites and mestiços. They eventually organised a coup in Goa and removed Peres from his post on 1 February. He had been in power for just seventeen days when he had been deposed. Peres was arrested and exiled to Bombay. In his place, the previous Viceroy Manuel de Portugal e Castro was appointed Governor.

=== Army revolt ===
On 10 February, disturbances broke out in Goa in his favour. The leader of the revolt that had deposed Peres, fearing arrest had resigned and handed control over to the Chief Counselor of the Prefecture. On 3 March, a faction of the army, consisting of local soldiers loyal to him, revolted and demanded Peres' reinstatement as prefect. The military governor refused and ordered troops to move against the revolutionaries. His supporters took refuge at Fort Gaspar Dias (Terekhol Fort). After a pitched battle, most protesters were massacred.

=== Expedition to liberate Goa ===
In Bombay, Peres plotted to liberate Goa from his opposers. At first, he sought help from the British, as the British were allies of the Portuguese. He expected them to support him as the legal authority appointed by Portugal in Goa, but they refused. He spent the next five months preparing an expeditionary force to capture Goa. He recruited nearly three hundred men for the task. Rogério de Faria financed his mission. The expeditionary force, set out from Bombay harbour on 27 May, in five vessels. Unfortunately, they were forced to turn back due to the advancing monsoons on 6 June.

=== Provisional government in Daman ===
Peres left for Daman, another Portuguese enclave, north of Bombay. He was welcomed there by the constitutionalists and supporters who still recognised him as prefect. He established a provisional government that lasted until 1837. Peres received arms and armaments from Faria for the defence of Daman, should his opposer's have attacked Daman. In return, Faria was to receive customs exemptions. Being in debt, Rogério de Faria asked for his money back (a sum of Rs. 67,957). The bureaucrats of Daman refused to clear the bills.

In 1836, the Portuguese conducted elections in the European-controlled constituencies, keeping four constituencies away. During Peres's absence, a provisional government headed by Rocha de Vasconcelos had been appointed. It was followed by the nomination of the Baron of Sabrosa as governor.

=== Return to Goa ===
Peres went back to Goa and made peace with the new governor, accepting his authority. On 9 November 1839, he was re-elected as representative from Goa to the Parliament. He returned to Portugal and continued to take part in the Parliament. He was appointed a member of the standing committee on colonies. He was re-elected to the parliament twice again till his death in 1842. He argued on behalf of his land in the Portuguese Parliament, even though no minister responded to his demands. He strongly defended the interests of Goa as well as other Portuguese colonies.

In 1840, Peres delivered a speech in the parliament, defending his actions as Governor. He also asked for an investigation of his adversaries. He later published his speech entitled "Aos Representantes da Nação Portuguesa". He demanded that the military forces stationed in Goa be done away with.

== Death ==
For most of his life, Peres lived in penury, and died a pauper. He had to sell off his household furniture to meet medical expenses. Bernardo da Silva died on 14 November 1844. He was buried in the Cemitério dos Prazeres in Lisbon. A portrait of Silva is displayed in the portrait gallery in Archaeological Museum in Panjim, Goa.

== See also ==
- History of Goa
- List of people from Goa
- List of governors of Portuguese India
