= José Guedes de Carvalho e Meneses =

Portuguese colonial administrator

Colonial governor of Cape Verde
- In office 25 April 1864 – 11 February 1869
- Preceded by: Carlos Joaquim Franco
- Succeeded by: Caetano Alexandre de Almeida e Albuquerque

Governor-general of Mozambique
- In office 10 August 1874 – 1 December 1877
- Preceded by: José Manuel Crispiniano da Fonseca
- Succeeded by: Francisco Maria da Cunha

Personal details
- Born: 19 May 1814 Mancelos (Amarante)
- Died: 10 December 1879 (aged 65) Lisbon, Portugal

José Guedes de Carvalho e Meneses (19 May 1814 – 10 December 1879) was a Portuguese colonial administrator. He was born on 19 May 1814 in Mancelos in northern Portugal. He was created Count of Costa by King Luís I in 1875. He was an older brother of Vasco Guedes de Carvalho e Meneses who was governor of Angola, Mozambique and Cape Verde.

He was governor general of Cape Verde from 25 April 1864 until 11 February 1869, succeeding Carlos Joaquim Franco. He was succeeded by Caetano Alexandre de Almeida e Albuquerque. On 10 August 1874, he was appointed governor general of Mozambique, succeeding José Manuel Crispiniano da Fonseca. He was succeeded by Francisco Maria da Cunha on 1 December 1877.

== See also ==
- List of colonial governors of Cape Verde
- List of colonial governors of Mozambique

== Notes ==
Preceded by Carlos Joaquim Franco	Colonial Governor of Cape Verde; 1864-69	Succeeded by Caetano Alexandre de Almeida e Albuquerque
Preceded by José Manuel Crispiniano da Fonseca	Governor-general of Mozambique; 1874-77	Succeeded by Francisco Maria da Cunha
