= Caetano Alexandre de Almeida e Albuquerque =

Portuguese colonial administrator and military officer

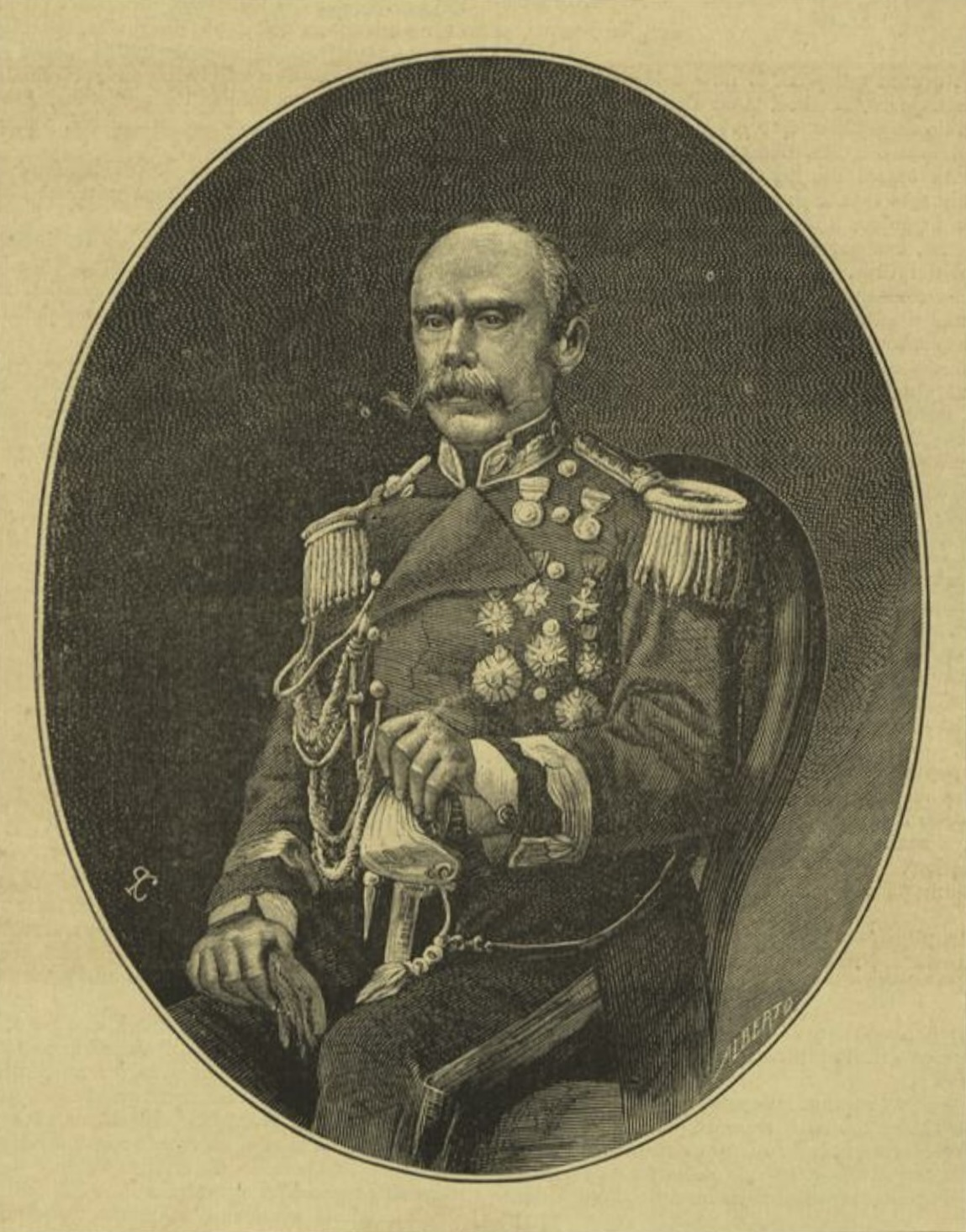

Colonial governor of Cape Verde
- In office 29 March 1869 – 26 February 1876
- Monarch: Luís I
- Prime Minister: Bernardo de Sá Nogueira de Figueiredo; Nuno José Severo de Mendoça; João Carlos de Saldanha Oliveira; Nuno José Severo de Mendoça; António José de Ávila; Fontes Pereira de Melo
- Minister of the Navy and Overseas (Note: Depending on the Minister of the Navy): José Maria Latino Coelho; Luís Augusto Rebelo da Silva; João Carlos de Saldanha Oliveira (as interim); António da Costa; Luís da Câmara Leme; Bernardo de Sá Nogueira de Figueiredo (as interim); José Eduardo de Melo Gouveia; Jaime Moniz; João de Andrade Corvo (as interim); Jaime Moniz (as interim); João de Andrade Corvo (as interim); Fontes Pereira de Melo (as interim); João de Andrade Corvo (as interim)
- Preceded by: José Guedes de Carvalho e Meneses
- Succeeded by: Guilherme Quintino Lopes de Macedo

Governor-General of Angola
- In office June 1876 – July 1878
- Monarch: Luís I
- Prime Minister: Fontes Pereira de Melo; António José de Ávila
- Minister of the Navy and Overseas: João de Andrade Corvo (as interim); Fontes Pereira de Melo; José Eduardo de Melo Gouveia; Tomás Ribeiro
- Preceded by: José Baptista de Andrade
- Succeeded by: Vasco Guedes de Carvalho e Meneses

Colonial governor of Portuguese India
- In office 3 December 1878 – 10 April 1882
- Monarch: Luís I
- Prime Minister: Fontes Pereira de Melo; Anselmo José Braamcamp; António Rodrigues Sampaio
- Minister of the Navy and Overseas: Tomás Ribeiro; João de Andrade Corvo (as interim); António Maria José de Melo César e Meneses; Anselmo José Braamcamp (as interim); Januário Correia de Almeida; Júlio de Vilhena; José Eduardo de Melo Gouveia
- Preceded by: António Sérgio de Sousa
- Succeeded by: Carlos Eugénio Correia da Silva

Personal details
- Born: 15 April 1824 Benfica, Lisbon
- Died: 8 September 1916 (aged 92) Lisbon

Caetano Alexandre de Almeida e Albuquerque (15 April 1824 – 8 September 1916) was a Portuguese colonial administrator and a military officer. He was governor general of Cape Verde from 29 March 1869 until 26 February 1876, succeeding José Guedes de Carvalho e Meneses. He was succeeded by Guilherme Quintino Lopes de Macedo. In June 1876, he was appointed governor general of Angola, succeeding José Baptista de Andrade. He was succeeded by Vasco Guedes de Carvalho e Meneses in July 1878. From 3 December 1878 until 10 April 1882 he was governor-general of Portuguese India.

The main square of Praia, the capital of Cape Verde, is named Praça Alexandre Albuquerque after him. There is a bronze bust of Albuquerque on the square.

== See also ==
- List of colonial governors of Cape Verde
- List of colonial governors of Angola
- List of governors of Portuguese India

== Notes ==
Preceded by José Guedes de Carvalho e Meneses	Colonial governor of Cape Verde; 1869-76	Succeeded by Guilherme Quintino Lopes de Macedo
Preceded by José Baptista de Andrade	Governor-general of Angola; 1876-78	Succeeded by Vasco Guedes de Carvalho e Meneses
Preceded by António Sérgio de Sousa	Governor of Portuguese India; 1878-82	Succeeded by Carlos Eugénio Correia da Silva
