= Alfredo Pedro de Almeida =

Former Governor-General of Portuguese India

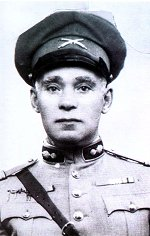

Governor-General of Portuguese India
- In office 12 July 1929 – 25 August 1929
- Preceded by: Acúrcio Mendes da Rocha Dinis
- Succeeded by: João Carlos Craveiro Lopes

Alfredo Pedro de Almeida was a major from Portugal who served as Governor-General of Portuguese India from 12 July 1929 to 25 August 1929.
