= Vasco Guedes de Carvalho e Meneses =

Portuguese colonial administrator and military officer

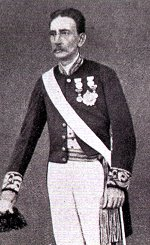

Colonial governor of Mozambique
- In office 24 April 1854 – 26 September 1857
- Preceded by: Joaquim Pinto de Magalhães
- Succeeded by: João Tavares de Almeida

Colonial governor of Cape Verde
- In office 22 December 1876 – 7 May 1878
- Preceded by: Guilherme Quintino Lopes de Macedo
- Succeeded by: António de Nascimento Pereira de Sampaio

Governor-general of Angola
- In office 7 May 1878 – July 1880
- Preceded by: Caetano Alexandre de Almeida e Albuquerque
- Succeeded by: António Eleutério Dantas

Colonial governor of Portuguese India
- In office 16 June 1889 – 10 March 1891
- Preceded by: Governing Council
- Succeeded by: Francisco Maria da Cunha

Personal details
- Born: 5 April 1822 Massarelos near Porto
- Died: 1 January 1905 (aged 82) Amarante

Vasco Guedes de Carvalho e Meneses (5 April 1822 – 1 January 1905) was a Portuguese colonial administrator and a military officer. He was a younger brother of José Guedes de Carvalho e Meneses who was governor of Mozambique and Cape Verde.

He was governor general of Mozambique from 24 April 1854 until 26 September 1857. He was governor general of Cape Verde from 22 December 1876 until 7 May 1878, when he became governor of Angola, an office he fulfilled until July 1880. He was governor of Portuguese India from 16 June 1889 until 10 March 1891.

He was Commander of the Order of Nossa Senhora da Conceição de Vila Viçosa.

== See also ==
- List of colonial governors of Cape Verde
- List of colonial governors of Angola
- List of colonial governors of Mozambique
- List of governors of Portuguese India

== Notes ==
| Preceded by Joaquim Pinto de Magalhães | Governor-general of Mozambique; 1854-1857 | Succeeded by João Tavares de Almeida |
| Preceded by Guilherme Quintino Lopes de Macedo | Colonial governor of Cape Verde; 1876-1878 | Succeeded by António de Nascimento Pereira de Sampaio |
| Preceded by Caetano Alexandre de Almeida e Albuquerque | Governor-general of Angola; 1878-1880 | Succeeded by António Eleutério Dantas |
| Preceded by Governing Council | Colonial governor of Portuguese India; 1889-1891 | Succeeded by Francisco Maria da Cunha |
