= Carlos Eugénio Correia da Silva, Count of Paço de Arcos =

Portuguese statesman

Carlos Eugénio Correia da Silva CvTE GCA ComC
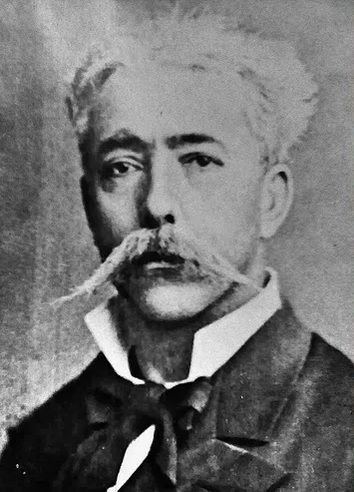
- Portrait, c. 1890

Governor of Macau
- In office 1876–1879
- Preceded by: José Maria Lobo de Ávila
- Succeeded by: Joaquim José da Graça

Governor-general of Mozambique
- In office 1881–1882
- Preceded by: Augusto César Rodrigues Sarmento
- Succeeded by: José de Almeida d'Ávila

Governor of Portuguese India
- In office 1882–1886
- Preceded by: Caetano Alexandre de Almeida e Albuquerque
- Succeeded by: Government Council of the State of India

Personal details
- Born: 17 December 1834 Encarnação, Lisbon, Portugal
- Died: 5 November 1905 (aged 70) Lapa, Lisbon, Portugal

Chinese name
- Traditional Chinese: 施理華
- Simplified Chinese: 施理华
Transcriptions
Standard Mandarin
- Hanyu Pinyin: Shī Lǐhuá
Yue: Cantonese
- Jyutping: si1 lei5 waa4

D. Carlos Eugénio Correia da Silva, 1st Viscount and 1st Count of Paço de Arcos (17 December 1834 – 5 November 1905), was a Portuguese statesman.

== Origins ==
The Count of Paço d'Arcos was born in the parish (freguesia) of the same name near Lisbon on 17 December 1834. His father was a high ranking Crown servant (Pagador-Geral da Marinha) that had allied himself with the liberal cause during the Portuguese Civil War. His mother came from a wealthy landed family, the Corrêa de Almeida (Counts of São Januário), that owned much of the land in the parish, with the notable exception of the Palace of the Arches (Palácio dos Arcos) that had belonged to the Counts of Alcáçovas for centuries.

On 6 September 1876 he married Emília Angélica de Castro Monteiro (b. Maia, Pedrouços, 3 October 1848), maternal granddaughter of the Viscounts and Counts of Castro, and had issue. The titles of Viscount and Count of Paço d'Arcos are held by the Correia da Silva family of Portugal.

== Naval career ==
He excelled in school from an early age, having attended the School for Nobles (Real Colégio dos Nobres) and later enrolled in the Portuguese Naval Academy (Escola Naval) at the age of 14, for which royal permission was needed. At 18 the young ensign had his first experience under fire having been given his first command of the schooner Venus whose mission was to apprehend the pirate Apack in the South China Sea. As a young second lieutenant he was appointed Knight of the Military Order of the Tower and Sword (Ordem Militar da Torre e Espada), Portugal's highest decoration awarded for bravery in combat, for his heroics in pursuing and capturing the Spanish slave ship Virgen del Refugio off the coast of Portuguese Guinea in 1864. As a 27-year-old second lieutenant in 1862 the Count of Paço d'Arcos also commanded the schooner Napier in pursuit of the US confederate pirate ship CSS Alabama in the mid Atlantic near the Azores.

He held many other commands, including the brig Pedro Nunes as first lieutenant, which had been King Luis I's personal command before accession to the throne. His appointment was a personal decision of the King with whom he shared a passion for the sea and later a close friendship. Usually such a prestigious command was held by someone of much higher rank and his appointment was proof of the King's confidence in his abilities as a leader of men. He later commanded the gunboat Zarco and the corvettes Sagres and Estefânia, eventually rising to the top of his career as a naval officer in the Portuguese Royal Navy, having achieved the rank of Vice-Admiral (1895) and Major-General of the Armada (the highest rank of the Portuguese Royal Navy) before his retirement one year prior to his death in 1905.

== Colonial and diplomatic career ==
The 1st Count of Paço d'Arcos had a notable colonial career throughout the Portuguese Empire, having reached its pinnacle as Governor-General of Portuguese India (1881). He was also Governor of Macao (1876–1879) and Mozambique (1880), as well as Portugal's first Ambassador to Brazil (1891–1893) after the former colony abolished the monarchy and sent Emperor Pedro II of Brazil of the House of Bragança into exile. This prestigious diplomatic post was fraught with difficulties as he represented to the new Brazilian republican government the reigning Portuguese House of Bragança which their ousted Emperor belonged to. In his diplomatic career he was also Minister Plenipotentiary to China, Japan and the Kingdom of Siam.

== Civil Governor of Lisbon ==
As Governor of Lisbon in 1890 the Count of Paço d'Arcos was responsible for ordering the bloody police crackdown after days of rioting followed the issuing of the British Ultimatum regarding Portuguese colonies in Africa. The republican underground in Portugal seized the opportunity of the humiliating British Ultimatum to blame the monarchy and the King for Portugal's loss of prestige. After news of the Ultimatum and Portugal's concessions in Africa (present day Zimbabwe) reached the Portuguese people, Lisbon was thrown into a state of turmoil following massive rioting which threatened to bring down the regime. This was perhaps the first sign of what was to come when 18 years later King Carlos I and the Prince Royal Luis Fílipe were assassinated by members of the jacobin Carbonária in downtown Lisbon on 1 February 1908, eventually leading to the republican revolution of 5 October 1910. The Count of Paço d'Arcos, in his role as Governor and commander of the police in Lisbon, fulfilled his duty without hesitation, ordering the police to use force, which led to his vilification by the republican press of the time.

== Promotion to "Grande do Reino" ==
Because of his service to the Crown, the Viscount of Paço d'Arcos was promoted in the Portuguese nobility to a Grandee of Portugal (Grande do Reino) when King Carlos I elevated his title to a Countship (Earl in Britain). His only son Henrique was, like his father, a distinguished naval officer and colonial ruler. Because of his beliefs and because of the republican revolution implanted by force of arms in 1910, he never claimed officially (encartar) the title of Count of Paço d'Arcos which nonetheless passed on to his eldest surviving son – also named Henrique.

== Other achievements and distinctions ==
The Count of Paço d'Arcos was also a member of His Most Faithful Majesty's Council (Conselho de Sua Majestade Fidelíssima), the Chamber of Deputies (Câmara dos Deputados) and a Peer of the Realm (Par do Reino) as well as Aide-de-Camp to the King (Ajudante de Campo d'el rei).

Other distinctions held:

- Grand Cross of the Royal Military Order of Avis (Portugal)
- Grand Cross of the Order of Naval Merit (Portugal)
- Grand Cross of the Royal Order of Spain
- Knight Grand Cross of the Order of the Crown of Siam
- Commander of the Royal Military Order of Christ (Portugal)
- Commander of the Royal Order of Charles III (Spain)
- Commander of the Royal Order of Isabel the Catholic (Spain)
- Knight of the Military Order of the Tower and Sword (Portugal)
- Knight of Order of the Immaculate Conception of Vila Viçosa (Portugal)

== Sources ==
- O Portal da História http://www.arqnet.pt/portal/portugal/liberalismo/lib1890.html
- Missão Diplomática do Conde Paço d'Arcos no Brasil – 1974
- Anuário da Nobreza de Portugal – 1964
- Vice-Reis e Governadores da Índia Portuguesa – 1999. ISBN 972-97829-2-X
- Nobreza de Portugal e Brasil – vol. 3 1989
- Resenha das Famílias Titulares e Grandes de Portugal – 1991
- Tratado de Todos os Vice-Reis e Governadores da Índia – 1962
- A Descendência Portuguesa de El-Rei D. João II – vol.3 1993
- Portugal's Largest Genealogy Portal http://www.geneall.net
