= Goraksh Valaulikar =

Captain Goraksh Varde Valaulikar (also referred to as Gorakshrao) was a Goan military officer and diplomat who served under the Portuguese for thirty years.

== Life and career ==
Valaulikar was the son of Pundalik Shenvi Varde Valaulikar. He began his service with the Portuguese as the captain of a platoon of Goan soldiers. He was later inducted into diplomatic service by the Viceroy and assigned to the court at Pune.

Valaulikar possessed strong command over both the Portuguese and Marathi languages, which helped him build significant influence within the Peshwa court. As a diplomat, he successfully mediated a reconciliation between Gogal and the Portuguese, and worked to maintain favourable relations between the Portuguese and the Wadkars.

In recognition of his standing and service at the court, the Peshwas conferred upon him the title of "Rao".
