= Rafael Jácome de Andrade =

Portuguese military figure and politician

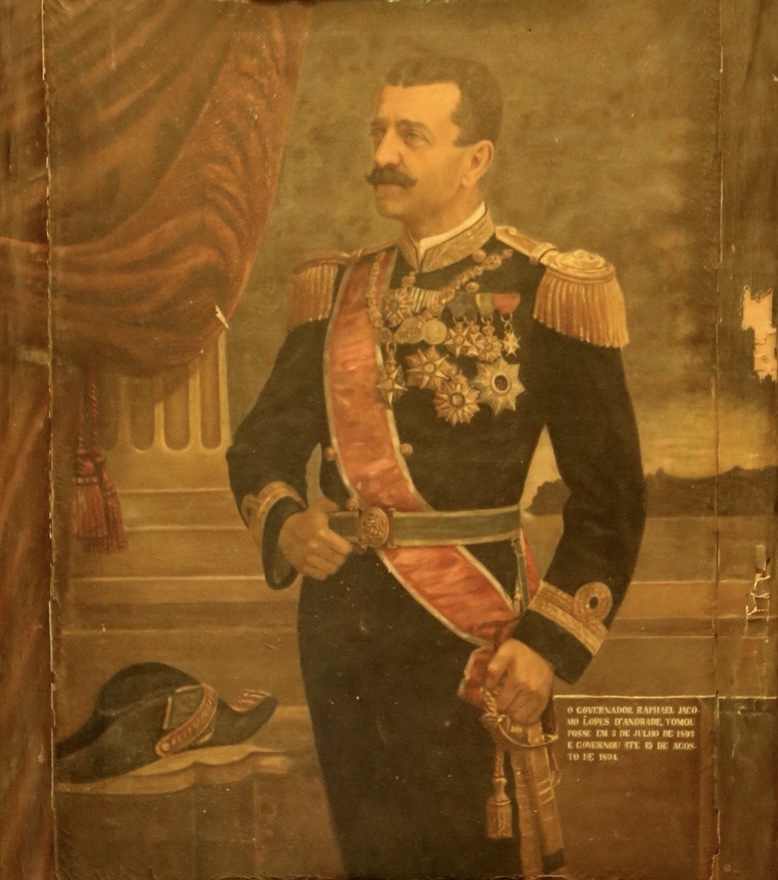

Personal details
- Born: Rafael Jácome de Andrade; 1 October 1851 Lisbon, Portugal
- Died: 25 July 1900 (aged 48) Sintra, Portugal

Rafael Jácome Lopes de Andrade (Lisbon, 1 October 1851 — Sintra, 25 July 1900) was a Portuguese military figure and politician. He was also a former Governor or Governor-General of Portuguese Timor, Portuguese Mozambique and Portuguese India.

Rafael Lopes de Andrade was born on 1 October 1851.

== As Governor, Governor-General ==
He served as Governor of Portuguese Timor, between 1888 and 1889, hen made improvements in the city of Díli. After he was appointed Governor-General of Portuguese Mozambique, between 1891 and 1893. On two occasions, he was Governor of Portuguese India, between 1893 and 1894 and then between 1895 and 1896.

== In Portuguese India ==
During his tenure in Portuguese India, his most important actions included the approval of several documents in which the diplomas granted by the Liceu Afonso de Albuquerque in Pangim were treated as having the equivalence as those granted by the Portuguese high-schools. It was also during this period that a school of arts and crafts (Escola de Artes e Oficios) was created.

== Awards and honours ==
From the Naval Military, was made Officer of the Order of Aviz (Ordem de Aviz), Comendador of the Order of the Tower and Sword (Ordem da Torre e Espada) and Comendador of the dynastic Order of Conception (Ordem da Conceição).

Rafael Lopes de Andrade died on 25 July 1900 in Sintra.

== See also ==
- Portuguese Empire
- List of colonial governors of Portuguese Timor
- List of colonial governors of Mozambique
- List of governors of Portuguese India
