= List of the viceroys of Portuguese India =

Viceroy of Portuguese India
- Portuguese: Vice-rei da Índia Portuguesa
- Coat of arms of Portuguese India
- Residence: Viceroy's House
- Nominator: Prime Minister of Portugal
- Appointer: Monarch of Portugal (1505–1910) President of Portugal (1910–1961)
- Formation: 12 September 1505
- First holder: Francisco de Almeida
- Final holder: Manuel António Vassalo e Silva
- Abolished: 19 December 1961
- Succession: Governor of Goa

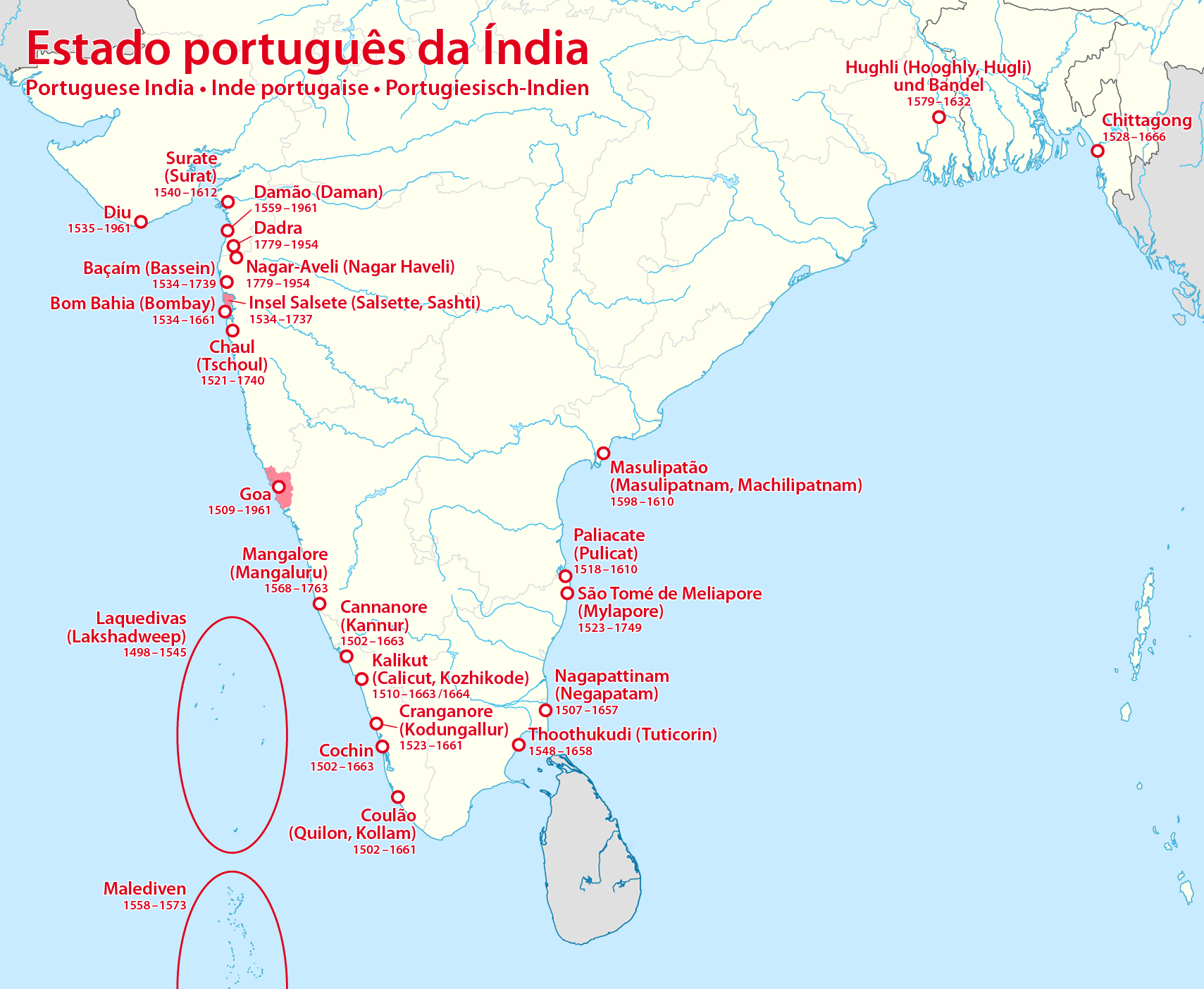
Map of Portuguese India

The government of Portuguese India (Portuguese: Índia Portuguesa) was established on 12 September 1505, seven years after the Portuguese discovery of the sea route to India by Vasco da Gama, with the nomination of the first Portuguese viceroy Francisco de Almeida, then settled at Cochin. Until 1752, the name India included all Portuguese possessions in the Indian Ocean, from Southern Africa to Southeast Asia, governed – either by a viceroy or governor – from its headquarters, established in the City of Goa since 1510.

In 1752, Portuguese Mozambique was granted its own government, and in 1844 the Portuguese government of India ceased administering the territory of Portuguese Macau, Solor and Portuguese Timor, seeing itself thus confined to a reduced territorial possessions along the Konkan, Canara and Malabar Coasts, which would further be reduced to the present-day state of Goa and the union territory of Daman.

Portuguese control ceased in Dadra and Nagar Haveli in 1954, and finally ceased in Goa in 1961, when the area was occupied by the Republic of India. Portugal only recognized the occupation after the Carnation Revolution in 1974, by a treaty signed on 31 December 1974. This ended four and a half centuries of Portuguese rule in the Indian subcontinent.

It may be noted that during the term of the monarchy, the title of the head of the Portuguese government in India ranged from "governor" to "viceroy". The title of viceroy would only be assigned to members of the nobility; it was formally terminated in 1774, although it has later been given sporadically to be decisively ended after 1835, as shown below.

== List of officeholders ==
The following is a list of rulers during the history of Portuguese India as a viceroyalty or governorship.

Title	Portrait	Name	Took office	Left office	Notes
Viceroy (nom.)		D. Tristão da Cunha	–	–	Nominated viceroy in 1504, but did not assume office
Viceroy		D. Francisco de Almeida	12 September 1505	November 1509	First governor and first viceroy of Portuguese India, appointed by King Manuel I of Portugal (r.1495–1521), conquered Kilwa, erected forts in Anjediva, Cochin, Cannanore, refused to cede office until after Battle of Diu, died at Table Bay, on return voyage, March 1510
Governor and Captain-General(*)		Afonso de Albuquerque	4 November 1509	September 1515	Appointment disputed and delayed by predecessor, conquered Goa, Malacca, Muscat and Hormuz, died off Goa, December 1515
Governor		Lopo Soares de Albergaria	8 September 1515	September 1518	Erected forts in Colombo (Ceylon) and Kollam, returned to Portugal
Governor		Diogo Lopes de Sequeira	8 September 1518	January 1522	Old explorer and former designated captain of Malacca (1509, aborted), erected forts in Chaul, Maldives and Pacem, sent embassies to Ethiopia, Pegu and China, returned to Portugal
Governor		D. Duarte de Menezes	22 January 1522	September 1524	Former captain of Tangier, grandson (via Tarouca line) of the famous Duarte de Menezes (Count of Viana), dismissed and returned to Portugal
Viceroy		D. Vasco da Gama	5 September 1524	December 1524	old discoverer of Indies route, now Count of Vidigueira, second Viceroy, first appointee of new King John III of Portugal (r.1521–1557), died at Cochin, December 1524
Governor		D. Henrique de Menezes (o Roxo)	17 January 1525	February 1526	succeeded in India by death of predecessor, died at Cannanore, February 1526
Governor		Lopo Vaz de Sampaio	February 1526	November 1529	succeeded in India by death of predecessor (third in line), refused to yield government to designated successor Pedro Mascarenhas, captain of Malacca), arrested, returned to Portugal as prisoner
Governor		Nuno da Cunha	18 November 1529	September 1538	son of Tristão da Cunha, arrival delayed by shipwreck in Madagascar, conquered northern province (Bassein, Bombay, Diu, Daman) died at sea on return to Portugal, March 1539
Viceroy		D. Garcia de Noronha	14 September 1538	April 1540	Third Viceroy, nephew of Afonso de Albuquerque, died in Cochin, April 1540
Governor		D. Estêvão da Gama	3 April 1540	May 1542	son of Vasco da Gama, captain of Portuguese Malacca (f.1538), succeeded in India by death of predecessor, returned to Portugal
Governor		Martim Afonso de Sousa	8 May 1542	1545	donatary-captain of São Vicente (Brazil, f. 1534), returned to Portugal
Governor		D. João de Castro	10 September 1545	1548	Nephew of D. Garcia de Noronha, promoted to Viceroy in early 1548
Viceroy		D. João de Castro	1548	June 1548	Fourth viceroy. Died at Goa, June 1548
Governor		Garcia de Sá	6 June 1548	June 1549	succeeded in India by death of predecessor, first governor married in India, acquired Bardez and Salcette, died at Goa, June 1549
Governor		Jorge Cabral	13 June 1549	November 1550	succeeded in India by death of predecessor, returned to Portugal
Viceroy		D. Afonso de Noronha	November 1550	September 1554	Fifth Viceroy (henceforth all Governors appointed in Lisbon will have rank of 'Viceroy'), former governor of Ceuta, 1540–49, son of Fernando de Menezes (Marquis of Vila Real), returned to Portugal
Viceroy		D. Pedro Mascarenhas	23 September 1554	June 1555	old discoverer of Indian Ocean islands, former captain of Malacca (1525–26), died at Goa, June 1555
Governor		Francisco Barreto	16 June 1555	September 1558	succeeded in India by death of predecessor, returned to Portugal. Later (1570) returned as governor of East Africa(**), led expedition to Monomatapa and died in Tete.
Viceroy		D. Constantino of Braganza	8 September 1558	September 1561	Son of James (Duke of Braganza), first appointee of Catherine of Austria, (regent of new King Sebastian of Portugal), returned to Portugal
Viceroy		D. Francisco Coutinho (Count of Redondo)	7 September 1561	19 February 1564	Died at Goa, February 1564
Governor		João de Mendonça	19 February 1564	September 1564	former captain of Malacca, succeeded in India by death of predecessor, returned to Portugal
Viceroy		D. Antão de Noronha	3 September 1564	September 1568	former captain of Ceuta (1549), and Hormuz (c. 1560) nephew of earlier India governor D. Afonso de Noronha, died at sea on return to Portugal
Viceroy		D. Luís de Ataíde	10 September 1568	September 1571	future Count of Atouguia (f.1577), first appointee of King Sebastian of Portugal in his own right returned to Portugal
Viceroy(**)		D. António de Noronha (o Catarraz)	6 September 1571	December 1573	Not to be confused with earlier namesake, governor in Goa of a reduced India (**), co-equal with António Moniz Barreto (in Malacca) and Francisco Barreto (in Sofala), dismissed and returned to Portugal
Viceroy		António Moniz Barreto	9 December 1573	September 1576	Governor of Malacca, succeeded in India after dismissal of predecessor, returned to Portugal
Viceroy (nom.)		Rui Lourenço de Távora	-	-	Nominated viceroy in 1576, but did not assume office
Governor		D. Diogo de Menezes	September 1576	August 1578	Son of Tangier captain João de Menezes ("o Craveiro"); Succeeded in India after appointed viceroy, Rui Lourenço de Távora, died en route (off Mozambique), returned to Portugal.
Viceroy		D. Luís de Ataíde (second time)	31 August 1578	March 1581	Second appointment, now Count of Atouguia, already in India when news of the king's death at Alcazarquivir arrived, managed India through the early stages of 1580 succession crisis, died in Goa, March 1581
Governor		Fernão Teles de Menezes	March 1581	September 1581	Succeeded in India by death of predecessor (as per prior instructions of the late Cardinal-King Henry), considered the last governor of the House of Avis, received news of ascension of Habsburg king Philip I of Portugal, administered oaths of loyalty of Portuguese India colonies to new monarchy, returned to Portugal.
Viceroy		Francisco de Mascarenhas	1581	1584	Donatary-captain in the Azores; First appointee of Philip I of Portugal (r.1581–1598), returned to Portugal.
Viceroy		D. Duarte de Menezes	1584	4 May 1588	Former governor of Tangier (1474–78), Algarve (1580), grandson of earlier India governor Duarte de Menezes, Died in Goa, May 1588.
Governor		D. Manuel de Sousa Coutinho	May 1588	1591	Former governor of Ceylon, current governor of Malacca; Succeeded in India by death of predecessor, Died in shipwreck while returning to Portugal.
Viceroy		Matias de Albuquerque	1591	1597	
Viceroy		D. Francisco da Gama, conde da Vidigueira	1597	1600	
Viceroy		Aires de Saldanha	1600	1605	
Viceroy		Martim Afonso de Castro	1605	June 1607	Died at Malacca in June 1607
Governor		Fr. Aleixo de Meneses, Archbishop of Goa	June 1607	1609	
Viceroy (nom.)		João Pereira Froas	-	-	Nominated viceroy in 1608, but did not assume office
Governor		André Furtado de Mendonça	1609		
Viceroy		Rui Lourenço de Távora	1609	1612	
Viceroy		D. Jerónimo de Azevedo	1612	1617	
Viceroy		D. João Coutinho	1617	1619	
Governor (nom.)		D. Jerónimo Coutinho	-	-	Nominated governor in 1619, but did not assume office
Governor		Fernando de Albuquerque	1619	1622	
Viceroy (nom.)		D. Afonso de Noronha	-	-	Nominated viceroy in 1621, but did not assume office
Viceroy		D. Francisco da Gama (second time)	1622	1628	
Viceroy		Fr. Luís de Brito e Meneses, Bishop of Meliapore	1628	July 1629	Died at Cochim in July 1629
Governing Council		1. Nuno Álvares Botelho; 2. D. Lourenço da Cunha; 3. Gonçalo Pinto da Fonseca	1629		
Viceroy		Miguel de Noronha, conde de Linhares	1629	1635	
Viceroy		Pedro da Silva	1635	June 1639	Died at Goa in June 1639
Governor		António Teles de Meneses	1639	1640	
Viceroy		João da Silva Telo e Meneses, conde de Aveiras	1640	1644	Returned to Portugal
Viceroy		Filipe Mascarenhas	1644	1651	
Viceroy (nom.)		João da Silva Telo e Meneses, conde de Aveiras (second time)	-	-	Died at Mozambique, en route to India (1651)
Governing Council		1. Fr. Francisco dos Mártires (Archbp of Goa); 2. Francisco de Melo e Castro; 3. António de Sousa Coutinho	1651	1652	
Viceroy		Vasco Mascarenhas, 1st Count of Óbidos	1652	1655	Expelled in internal coup
Usurper		Brás de Castro	1655		Arrested by successor
Governor		Rodrigo Lobo da Silveira, Count of Sarzedas	23 August 1655	14 January 1656	Died at Goa in January 1656
Governor		Manuel Mascarenhas Homem	14 January 1656	22 May 1656	
Governing Council		1. Manuel Mascarenhas Homem; 2. Francisco de Melo e Castro; 3. António de Sousa Coutinho	January 1656	1661	
Governing Council		1. Luís de Mendonça Furtado e Albuquerque; 2. Manuel Mascarenhas Homem; 3. D. Pedro de Lencastre	1661		
Governing Council		1. Luís de Mendonça Furtado e Albuquerque, 2. António de Melo e Castro; 3. D. Pedro de Lencastre	1661	1662	
Viceroy		António de Melo e Castro	16 December 1662	1666	
Viceroy		João Nunes da Cunha, Count of São Vicente	1666	November 1668	Died at Goa in November 1668
Governing Council		1. António de Melo e Castro, 2. Manuel Corte-Real de Sampaio; 3. Luís de Miranda Henriques	November 1668	1671	
Viceroy		Luís de Mendonça Furtado e Albuquerque	1671	1676	Died off Lisbon on return voyage
Viceroy		D. Pedro de Almeida, Conde de Assumar	1676	1678	Died at Goa in 1678
Interim Governor		António Brandão, Archbishop of Goa (sometime with António Pais de Sande)	1678	1681	
Viceroy		Francisco de Távora, conde de Alvor	1681	1686	
Governor		D. Rodrigo da Costa	1686	1690	
Governor		D. Miguel de Almeida	1690	January 1691	Died at Goa in January 1691
Governing Council		1. Fernando Martins Mascarenhas Lencastre; 2. Fr. Agostinho da Anunciação (Archbp of Goa)	January 1691	1692	
Viceroy		Pedro António de Meneses Noronha de Albuquerque	1692	1697	Returned to Portugal
Viceroy		António Luís Gonçalves da Câmara Coutinho	1697	1701	
Governing Council		1. Fr. Agostinho da Anunciação (Archp of Goa); 2. D. Vasco Lima Coutinho	1701	1702	
Viceroy		Caetano de Melo e Castro	1702	1707	
Viceroy		D. Rodrigo da Costa (second time, as Viceroy now)	1707	1712	
Viceroy		Vasco Fernandes César de Meneses, Count of Sabugosa	1712	1717	Returned to Portugal
Governor		Fr. Sebastião de Andrade Pessanha, Archbishop of Goa	January 1717	October 1717	
Viceroy		Luís Carlos Inácio Xavier de Meneses, 5th Count of Ericeira	October 1717	1720	
Viceroy		Francisco José de Sampaio e Castro	1720	July 1723	Died at Goa in July 1723
Interim Governor		Cristóvão de Melo	July 1723		
Governing Council		1. Cristóvão de Melo; 2. Fr. Inácio de Santa Teresa (Archbp of Goa); 3. Cristóvão Luís de Andrade	1723	1725	
Viceroy		João de Saldanha da Gama	1725	1732	Returned to Portugal
Governing Council		1. Cristóvão de Melo; 2. Fr. Inácio de Santa Teresa (Archbp of Goa); 3. Tomé Gomes Moreira	1732		
Viceroy		Pedro Mascarenhas, 1st Count of Sandomil	1732	1740	Returned to Portugal
Viceroy		Luís Carlos Inácio Xavier de Meneses, 1st Marquis of Louriçal (second time)	1740	1742	Died at Goa in 1742
Governing Council		1. Francisco de Vasconcelos; 2. Lourenço de Noronha; 3. Luís Caetano de Almeida	1742	1744	
Viceroy		Pedro Miguel de Almeida Portugal e Vasconcelos, Count of Assumar, marquis of Alorna	1744	1750	
Viceroy		Francisco de Assis de Távora, marquis of Távora	September 1750	1754	Returned to Portugal, executed in 1759
Viceroy		Luís Mascarenhas, Count of Alva	1754	June 1756	Killed in action by the Maratha Army at Goa in June 1756
Governing Council		1. António Taveira da Neiva Brum da Silveira; (Archbp of Goa); 2. João de Mesquista Matos Teixeira; 3. Filipe de Valadares	1756	1757	
Viceroy		Manuel de Saldanha e Albuquerque, Count of Ega	1758	1765	Returned to Portugal
Council		1. António Taveira da Neiva Brum da Silveira; (Archbp of Goa); 2. João Baptista Vaz Pereira; 3. D. João José de Melo	1765	1768	
Governor		João José de Melo	1768	1771	Promoted to Captain-General in 1771 (***)
Governor and Captain-General		João José de Melo	1771	January 1774	Died at Goa in January 1774
Interim Governor		Filipe de Valadares Sotomaior	1774		
Governor and Captain-General of India		D. José Pedro da Câmara	1774	1779	
Governor and Captain-General of India		D. Frederico Guilherme de Sousa Holstein	1779	1786	
Governor and Captain-General of India		Francisco da Cunha e Meneses	1786	1794	
Governor and Captain-General of India		Francisco António da Veiga Cabral da Câmara, Viscount of Mirandela	1794	1806	
Viceroy and Captain-General of India		D. Bernardo José Maria da Silveira e Lorena, Count of Sarzedas	1806	1816	
Viceroy and Captain-General of India		D. Diogo de Sousa, Count of Rio Pardo	1816	1821	
Provisional Junta of Government of the State of India		Manuel José Gomes Loureiro, Manuel Godinho Mira, Joaquim Manuel Correia da Silva e Gama, Gonçalo de Magalhães Teixeira Pinto; Manuel Duarte Leitão	1821		
Provisional Junta of Government of the State of India		D. Manuel da Câmara, D. Frei de São Tomás de Aquino, António José de Melo Sotomaior Teles, João Carlos Leal; António José de Lima Leitão	1821	1822	
Provisional Junta of Government of the State of India		D. Manuel da Câmara, D. Frei de São Tomás de Aquino, António José de Melo Sotomaior Teles, João Carlos Leal, Joaquim Mourão Garcez Palha	1822	1823	
Viceroy and Captain-General of India		D. Manuel da Câmara	1823	1825	Dissolved Junta and assumed de facto title of Governor of Portuguese India
Government Council of the State of India		D. Frei Manuel de São Galdino, Cândido José Mourão Garcez Palha, António Ribeiro de Carvalho	1825	1826	
Governor and Captain-General of India		D. Manuel Francisco Zacarias de Portugal e Castro	1826	1830	
Viceroy and Captain-General of India		D. Manuel Francisco Zacarias de Portugal e Castro	1830	1835	
Governor		Bernardo Peres da Silva	1835		
Governor		D. Manuel Francisco Zacarias de Portugal e Castro	1835		
Governor		Joaquim Manuel Correia da Silva e Gama	1835		
Government Council of the State of India		João Casimiro Pereira da Rocha de Vasconcelos, Manuel José Ribeiro, Frei Constantino de Santa Rita, João Cabral de Estefique, António Maria de Melo, Joaquim António de Morais Carneiro, António Mariano de Azevedo, José António de Lemos	1835	1837	After 1836 confined to Goa
Governor		Bernardo Peres da Silva	1836	1837	Governor of Daman and Diu, provisional governor of Goa
Governor		Simão Infante de Lacerda de Sousa Tavares, Baron of Sabroso	1837	1839	(restored unity to Portuguese India)
Governor		José António Vieira da Fonseca	1839		
Governor		Manuel José Mendes, Baron of Candal	1839	1840	
Government Council of the State of India		José António Vieira da Fonseca, José Câncio Freire de Lima, António João de Ataíde, Domingos José Mariano Luís, José da Costa Campos, Caetano de Sousa e Vasconcelos	1840		
Interim Governor		José Joaquim Lopes Lima	1840	1842	
Government Council of the State of India		António Ramalho de Sá, António José de Melo Sotomaior Teles, António João de Ataíde, José da Costa Campos; Caetano de Sousa e Vasconcelos	1842		
Governor		Francisco Xavier da Silva Pereira, Count of Antas	1842	1843	
Governor		Joaquim Mourão Garcez Palha	1843	1844	
Governor		José Ferreira Pestana	1844	1851	
Governor		José Joaquim Januário Lapa, Viscount of Vila Nova de Ourém	1851	1855	
Government Council of the State of India		D. Frei Joaquim de Santa Rita Botelho, Arcebispo de Goa e Primaz das Índias, Luís da Costa Campos, Francisco Xavier Peres, Bernardo Heitor da Silva e Lorena, Vítor Anastácio Mourão Garcez Palha	1855		
Governor		António César de Vasconcelos Correia, Count of Torres Novas	1855	1864	
Governor		José Ferreira Pestana	1864	1870	2nd term
Governor		Januário Correia de Almeida, Count of São Januário	1870	1871	
Governor		Joaquim José Macedo e Couto	1871	1875	
Governor		João Tavares de Almeida	1875	1877	
Government Council of the State of India		D. Aires de Ornelas e Vasconcelos, Archbishop of Goa and Primate of the Indies, João Caetano da Silva Campos, Francisco Xavier Soares da Veiga; Eduardo Augusto de Sá Nogueira Pinto Balsemão	1877		
Governor		António Sérgio de Sousa	1877	1878	
Government Council of the State of India		D. Aires de Ornelas e Vasconcelos, Archbishop of Goa and Primate of the Indies, João Caetano da Silva Campos, Francisco Xavier Soares da Veiga; António Sérgio de Sousa Júnior	1878		
Governor		Caetano Alexandre de Almeida e Albuquerque	1878	1882	
Governor		Carlos Eugénio Correia da Silva, Viscount of Paço d'Arcos	1882	1886	
Government Council of the State of India		D. António Sebastião Valente, Archbishop of Goa and Patriarch of the East Indies, José de Sá Coutinho, José Inácio de Brito; José Maria Teixeira Guimarães	1886		
Governor		Francisco Joaquim Ferreira do Amaral	1886		
Government Council of the State of India		D. António Sebastião Valente, Archbishop of Goa and Patriarch of the East Indies, José de Sá Coutinho, José Inácio de Brito; José Maria Teixeira Guimarães	1886		
Governor		Augusto César Cardoso de Carvalho	1886	1889	
Interim Governor		Joaquim Augusto Mouzinho de Albuquerque	1889		
Government Council of the State of India		D. António Sebastião Valente, Archbishop of Goa and Patriarch of the East Indies, Joaquim Borges de Azevedo Enes, José Inácio de Brito, Joaquim Augusto Mouzinho de Albuquerque	1889		
Governor		Vasco Guedes de Carvalho e Meneses	1889	1891	
Governor		Francisco Maria da Cunha	1891		
Interim Governor		João Manuel Correia Taborda	1891	1892	1st term
Government Council of the State of India		D. António Sebastião Valente, Archbishop of Goa and Patriarch of the East Indies, Luís Fisher Berquó Falcão, Raimundo Maria Correia Mendes, João Manuel Correia Taborda	1892		
Governor		Francisco Teixeira da Silva	1892	1893	
Government Council of the State of India		Luís Poças Falcão, Raimundo Maria Correia Mendes, João Manuel Correia Taborda	1893		
Governor		Rafael Jácome de Andrade	1893	1894	1st term
Interim Governor		João Manuel Correia Taborda	1894		2nd term
Government Council of the State of India		D. António Sebastião Valente, Archbishop of Goa and Patriarch of the East Indies, Francisco António Ochoa, Luís Carneiro de Sousa e Faro, João Manuel Correia Taborda	1894		
Governor		Elesbão José de Bettencourt Lapa, Viscount of Vila Nova de Ourém	1894	1895	
Governor		Rafael Jácome de Andrade	1895	1896	2nd term
Viceroy		Prince D. Afonso Henriques de Bragança, Duke of Porto	1896		
Interim Governor		João António de Brissac das Neves Ferreira	1896	1897	
Interim Governor		João Manuel Correia Taborda	1897		3rd term
Government Council of the State of India		D. António Sebastião Valente, Archbishop of Goa and Patriarch of the East Indies, Francisco António Ochoa, João de Melo Sampaio, João Manuel Correia Taborda	1897		
Government Council of the State of India		D. António Sebastião Valente, Archbishop of Goa and Patriarch of the East Indies, Abel Augusto Correia do Pinto, João de Melo Sampaio, João Manuel Correia Taborda	1897		
Governor		Joaquim José Machado	1897	1900	
Governor		Eduardo Augusto Rodrigues Galhardo	1900	1905	
Government Council of the State of India		D. António Sebastião Valente, Archbishop of Goa and Patriarch of the East Indies, Alfredo Mendonça David, José Emílio Santana da Cunha Castel-Branco, Francisco Maria Peixoto Vieira	1905		
Governor		Arnaldo de Novais Guedes Rebelo	1905	1907	
Government Council of the State of India		Bernardo Nunes Garcia, César Augusto Rancon, Francisco Maria Peixoto Vieira	1907		
Governor		José Maria de Sousa Horta e Costa	1907	1910	
Governor-General		Francisco Manuel Couceiro da Costa	1910	1917	
Interim Governor-General		Francisco Maria Peixoto Vieira	1917		1st term
Government Council of the State of India		Francisco Peixoto de Oliveira e Silva, Francisco Wolfgango da Silva, Francisco Maria Peixoto Vieira	1917		
Governor-General		José de Freitas Ribeiro	1917	1919	
Interim Governor-General		Augusto de Paiva Bobela da Mota	1919	1920	
Governador-General		Jaime Alberto de Castro Morais	1920	1925	
Interim Governor-General		Francisco Maria Peixoto Vieira	1925		2nd term
Governor-General		Mariano Martins	1925	1926	
Interim Governor-General		Tito Augusto de Morais	1926		
Interim Governor-General		Acúrcio Mendes da Rocha Dinis	1926	1927	
Governor-General		Pedro Francisco Massano de Amorim	1927	1929	
Interim Governor-General		Acúrcio Mendes da Rocha Dinis	1929		
Governor-General		Alfredo Pedro de Almeida	1929	1930	
Governor-General		João Carlos Craveiro Lopes	1930	1936	
Interim Governor-General		Francisco Craveiro Lopes	1936	1938	
Governor-General		José Ricardo Pereira Cabral	1938	1945	
Interim Governor-General		Paulo Bénard Guedes	1945	1946	
Governor-General		José Ferreira Bossa	1946	1947	
Interim Governor-General		José Alves Ferreira	1947	1948	
Governor-General		Fernando de Quintanilha e Mendonça Dias	1948	1952	
Governor-General		Paulo Bénard Guedes	1952	1958	
Governor-General		Manuel António Vassalo e Silva	1958	1961	

(*) – In 1508, King Manuel I of Portugal devised a plan to partition the Portuguese empire in Asia into three separate governments or "high captaincies" – (1) Captain-Major of the seas of Ethiopia, Arabia and Persia, centered at Socotra, was to cover the East African and Arabian-Persian coasts, from Sofala to Diu; (2) Captain-Major of the seas of India, centered at Cochin, was to cover the Indian coast from Diu down to Cape Comorin. Afonso de Albuquerque was Captain-General of the latter. Jorge de Aguiar was made Captain-General of the former. A third high captaincy, covering Asia east of Cape Comorin (yet to be explored) was assigned to Diogo Lopes de Sequeira, who was assigned that year to discover Malacca. The triarchy experiment failed – Aguiar drowned en route, while Sequeira quit the region in 1509, after his debacle at Malacca, leaving Albuquerque sole governor of the whole unpartitioned complex.

(**) – Around 1570, King Sebastian of Portugal tried to partition the Portuguese State of India into three separate governments (much like Manuel's plan of 1508) – a western state based around Sofala (covering the East African coast from Cape Correntes to Cape Guardafui), a central state ruled from Goa (covering the area between the Red Sea and Ceylon, encompassing India, reserved for the "Viceroy") and an eastern state ruled from Malacca (covering Southeast Asia, from Pegu to China). D. António de Noronha was appointed to Goa, António Moniz Barreto to Malacca, and Francisco Barreto (the former India governor) to Sofala.

(***) – Title of Viceroy of Indies extinguished by royal letter in 1771, replaced by Capitão-Geral (Captain-General) of the Indies.
