= Joaquim José Machado =

Portuguese politician, military officer and engineer

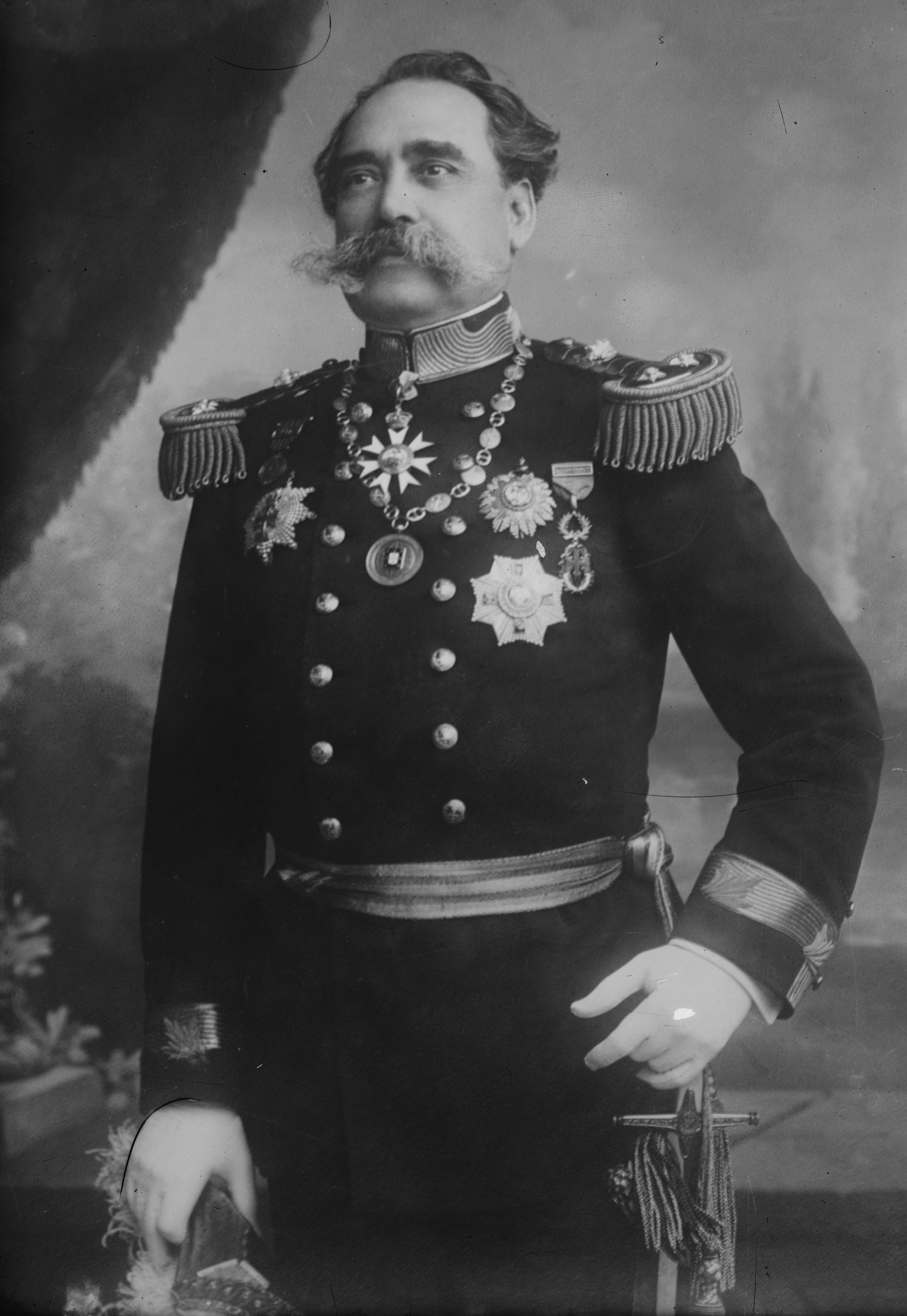
General Joaquim José Machado

Joaquim José Machado (24 September 1847 in Lagos – 22 February 1925 in Lisbon), locally known as Conselheiro (Councillor) Joaquim Machado or Major Machado GCC • GOA • ComA • OSE, was a military officer, engineer and a Portuguese politician.

== Biography ==
He was born in the city of Lagos, on 24 September 1847.

=== Career ===
After completing his engineering studies, he enlisted in the army in October 1869. He was promoted to sub-lieutenant by 1873, lieutenant in 1875, captain in 1876, major in 1887, lieutenant colonel in 1892 and colonel on November 21, 1895, before being promoted to general.

In 1877, he was appointed Diretor das Obras Públicas de Moçambique (Director of Public Works in Mozambique), carrying-out several public works in the province, including the plan to lay-down part of the Lourenço Marques to Pretoria railway (originally commissioned by the president of the Transvaal, Paul Kruger).

In 1890, he was appointed Governor of the Province of Mozambique, a position he held until 1891, where was important during the period of the British Ultimatum. Further, he undertook the construction of a rail link between Moçâmedes and Bié Province in Angola, during his governorship. He would later repeat his role as governor on two separate occasions: in 1900, and between 1914 and 1915.

During his time, he was part of the Board of Governors of the Companhia de Moçambique (Mozambique Co.), and headed Obra Públicas (Public Works department) of Moçâmedes.

Meanwhile, between 1897 and 1900, Machado was appointed the 110th Governor of Portuguese India, before becoming a counsellor in 1902, where he was instrumental in renegotiating the Mormugao railway rates in London, while head of its management commission.

=== Death ===
He died in Lisbon, on 22 February 1925.

== Honours ==
He was awarded the Order of Aviz and decorated with the Military Order of Saint James of the Sword.

In 1953, the Sociedade de Geografia de Lisboa (Lisbon Geographic Society) installed a bust of Machado, by sculptor Raul Xavier in its headquarters. Similar commemorative plaques or busts were installed in various locations, including a plaque on the house where he was born, a bust in a square in the city of Lagos, and on 24 October 1895, a street in São Sebastião was named the ex-governor. In Angola, three monuments were erected in his honor, with the city of Camacupa, originally named after him. The South African region, through which the Lourenço Marques to Pretoria railway line passed, was named Machadodorp (that combined his name and the 'dorp' place name, signifying small town in Afrikaans).
