= Reishahr rebellion (1539–40) =

- Part of Portuguese–Safavid relations
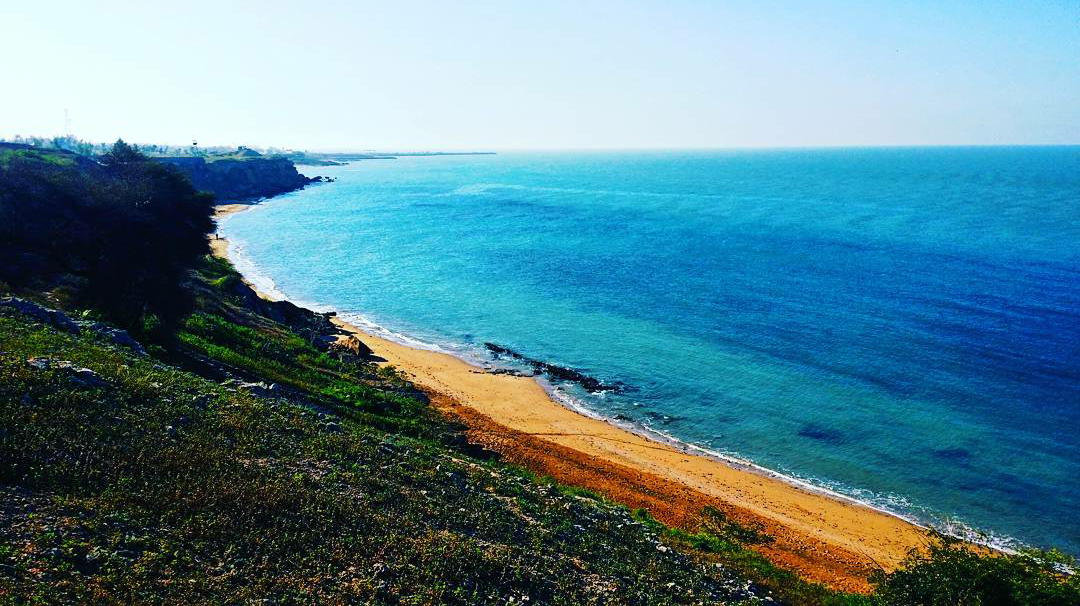
- Modern day Reishahr
| Date | 1539 – 1540 (~8 months) |
| Location | Reishahr, Bushehr (modern Iran) |
| Result | Safavid–Portuguese victory |
| Territorial changes | Capitulation and loss of Reishahr's autonomy |

Belligerents
| Safavid Empire; Kingdom of Portugal | Reishahr rebels |

Commanders and leaders
| Ghazi Khan Zulqadar; Manuel do Carvalhal | Hasan Sultan (surrendered) (executed); Shah Ali |

Strength
| 12,000–20,000 men 9 vessels | Unknown |

Casualties and losses
- 5,000+ civilian deaths

The Reishahr rebellion of 1539–1540 (or the Siege of Reyshahr) was a revolt led by Hasan Sultan and his brother Shah Ali following the Portuguese expeditions to Reishahr. It was suppressed after a long land siege by the Safavids, made decisive by a Portuguese naval blockade, resulting in Reishahr's capitulation and loss of autonomy.

== Bibliography ==
- Potts, D. T. (2023). "A contribution to the location of the Late Antique settlements known as Rēw-Ardašīr or Rēšahr". Sasanian Studies/Sasanidische Studien. 2: 199–228. doi:10.13173/SST.1.215.
- Floor, Willem M. (2006). A political and economic history of five port cities, 1500-1730. Washington, DC: Mage Publishers. ISBN 9781933823126.
