= Minab =

City in Hormozgan province, Iran

Minab Persian: میناب
- City
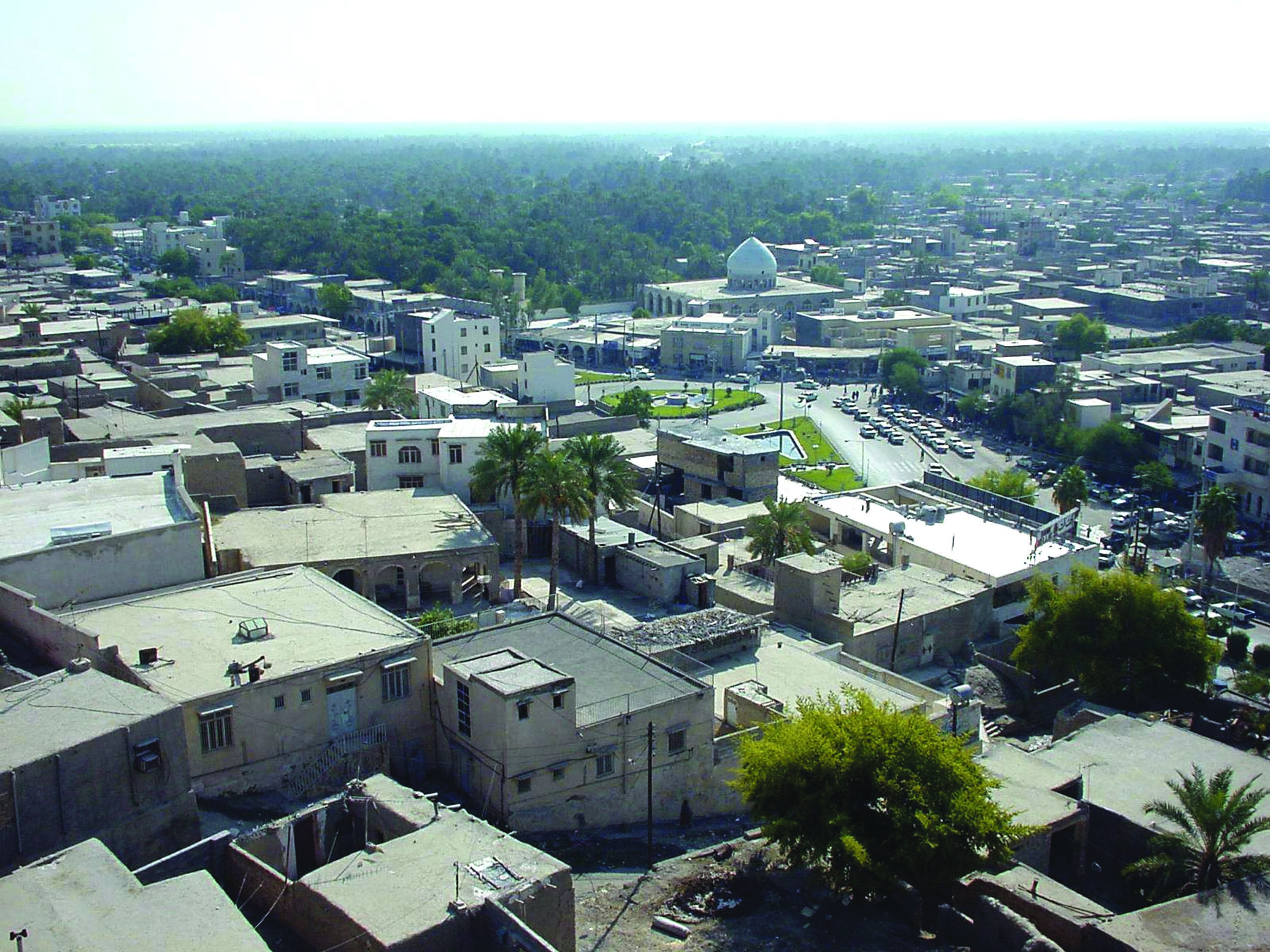
- The city of Minab during a sunny day

- Location within Iran
- Coordinates: 27°08′06″N 57°04′41″E
- Country: Iran
- Province: Hormozgan
- County: Minab
- District: Central

Population (2016)
  - Total: 73,170
- Time zone: UTC+3:30 (IRST)

Minab (Persian: میناب) (Note: Also romanized as Mīnāb) is a city in the Central District of Minab County, Hormozgan province, Iran, serving as capital of both the county and the district.

== History ==
=== Early history ===
Historically, Minab had been part of the Kerman province. Human presence in the Minab and its surroundings extends into remote prehistory, despite its earliest appearance in a Persian text first being in the 19th century text Asar-e jafari by Mohammad Jafar Hoseyni Khvormuji, who listed Minab under the jurisdiction of Bandar Abbas. 200,000–250,000 year old Middle Palaeolithic stone tools were discovered in Minab during the 1970s. In the village of Sardang-e Komiz within the Rudan County, ceramics from the 3rd millennium BC have been found.

Minab also contains painted pottery made under the Parthian (247 BC–224 AD) and Sasanian (224–651) empires. During the early medieval period, there were many inhabitants in the area, demonstrated by a large presence of East Asian ceramics that reflect maritime trade links with China and Southeast Asia. A fortress at Minab is documented in 1318, when it served as a refuge for the king of Hormuz. Minab, Manujan and Vashkerd were considered part of the "outer territories" (birunat) that formed the original Kingdom of Hormuz. Each of them were governed by a vizier. In 1515, the kingdom became a vassal state of the Portuguese Empire. This caused a dispute with Safavid Iran, which considered Hormuz to be their vassal. When the Ottoman commander Piri Reis and his soldiers attacked Hormuz in 1552, Iranian and Portuguese families sought refuge in Minab. In 1569, Minab, Shamil and Tezerg were briefly captured by Yaqub Beg, the governor of Kerman. The operation had been ordered by Shah Tahmasp I (r. 1524–1576), due to the alleged tyranny of the authorities in the area. The captured areas were soon returned, though it is unknown how.

=== Modern period ===
==== Safavid era ====
On 17 October 1602, Minab and Shamil was attacked by the Iranian forces led by Allahverdi Khan, the governor of Fars. He did it with the intention of stopping Portuguese attempts to retake Bahrain, which he had just conquered. After capturing Shamil during a three month siege, the Iranian army quickly conquered Minab, where both sides suffered heavy casualties. Qanbar Soltan Zanganeh was subsequently installed as the governor of Minab and its surroundings. In 1621, Maani died in Minab while visiting the town with her husband, the Italian composer Pietro Della Valle, as they traveled from Isfahan to Hormuz.

Soon afterwards, at Minab, Allahverdi Khan's son and successor as governor of Fars, Emamqoli Khan, made an alliance with the British East India Company representatives Edward Monox and Thomas Rastell, who agreed to help Abbas the Great (r. 1587–1629) to expel the Portuguese from Hormuz and Qeshm Island. The Iranian government was supported by the kalantar (mayor) of Minab, Sheykh Seyfi. In 1672, soldiers from Minab participated in the Safavid military campaign against insubordinate Balochis in the Kij-Makran province. In 1674, Naser Ali Khan was installed as the governor of Bandar Abbas. His oppressive rule led to the Safavid court receiving complaints from both Minab and Bandar Abbas. After the Safavid dynasty was deposed by Afghan Hotak dynasty in 1722, the people of Minab sought protection from their mayor, Mir Abdollah. He requested military assistance from the Dutch to protect the fort of Minab, though this request was unsuccessful. In 1725, Mir Abdollah helped defend Bandar Abbas with 500 soldiers at his command.

Afghan troops captured Bandar Abbas and Minab in 1727, though officials loyal to the Safavids managed to retain Hormuz and Qeshm. In 1729, Bandar and Minab were conquered by Amir Mehr-Ali on behalf of Tahmaspqoli Khan, the governor of Kerman. Fruitless requests for aid were made to the Dutch and English authorities.

==== Afsharid, Zand, and Qajar eras ====
In 1744, the region was plundered by Mohammad Baqer Beg Lari, which devastated the economy of Minab and paused both regional agriculture and trade. That same year, Nader Shah placed Bandar Abbas and Minab under temporary Dutch administration following the rebellion of Mohammad Taqi Khan Shirazi, the governor of Fars. The Dutch managed these territories in the name of Nader Shah.

In 1756, a Dutch record described Minab; "the Persian coast begins with Minauw. Its inhabitants live from agriculture and not from navigation (having only a few flat-bottomed vessels). Moreover, as they are completely Persian subjects one can not count them among the navigators of this Gulf". During the Zand era (1751–1794), Minab endured pillaging by Balochi raiders and was caught in the middle of disputes between Molla Ali Hoseyn of Bandar Abbas and Naser Khan of Lar. In c. 1794, Minab was captured by the Omani Empire, who maintained their rule there through much of the 19th century despite persistent conflicts.

In 1853/54, the governorship of Minab, Bandar Abbas and Shamil was gained by the merchant Mohammad Rahim Khan Shirazi. In 1855/56, Abd al-Baqi Mirza expelled Omani forces from Bandar Abbas. While retreating, this Omani force captured the mayor of Minab, Ahmad Shah Minabi, and transferred him to Qeshm. The governorship of Bandar Abbas its surrounding dependencies (such as Shamil and Minab) was subsequently given to the Imam of Muscat. In 1867/1868, this jurisdiction was instead given to Mehdiqoli Mirza, the governor of Larestan. In 1872/73, Ahmad Shah Minabi succeeded him. During the period from 1873 to 1888, the port, villages, and district of Minab were documented by Mohammad Ebrahim Kazeruni. In the late 19th century, a well-provisioned marketplace existed outside the walls of the local Minab fort.

==== 2000-present ====
By 2019, the Islamic Revolutionary Guard Corps Navy's Asef Missile Brigade, composed of four batteries for launching short, medium, and long range missiles on sea and land targets, was based in Minab.

On 28 February 2026, during the 2026 Israeli–United States strikes on Iran, an elementary girls' school was struck in the city, killing at least 180, mostly schoolgirls, and injuring 95 others according to Iranian officials.

== Demographics ==
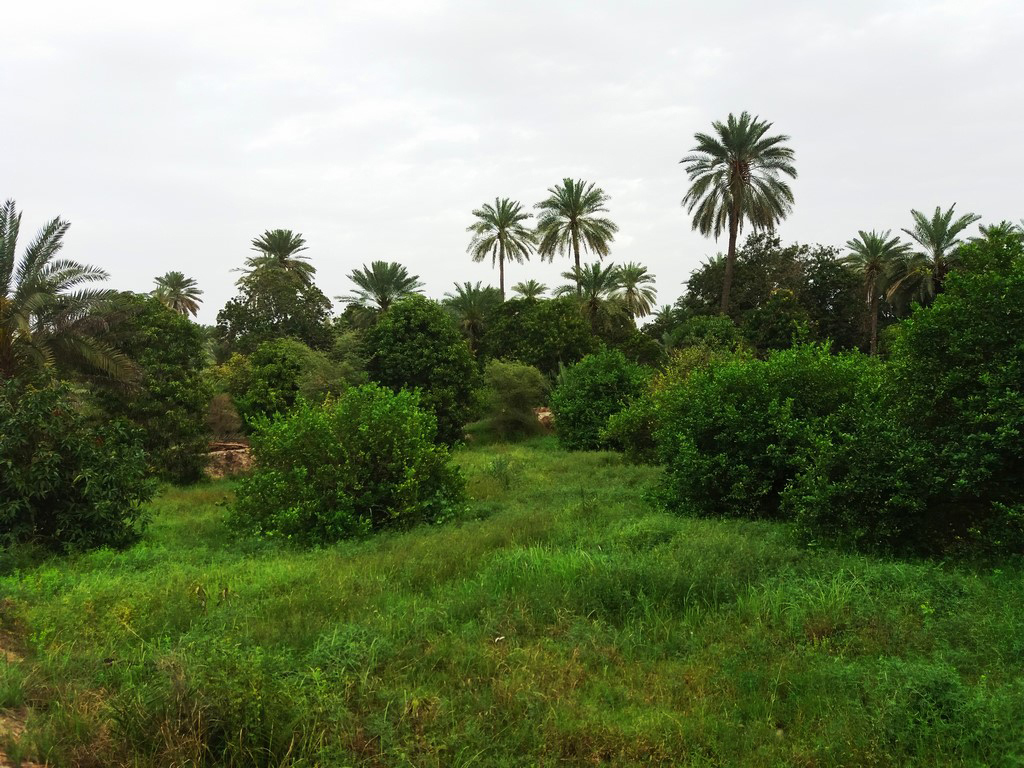
Minab is an area suitable for agriculture and it is common to grow citrus fruits, summer fruits and dates.

=== Language ===
Minab is largely a Farsi Bandari dialect speaking city. Most residents are Shia muslims.

=== Population ===
At the time of the 2006 National Census, the city's population was 54,623 in 11,224 households. The following census in 2011 counted 63,229 people in 15,172 households. The 2016 census measured the population of the city as 73,170 people in 19,023 households.

== Geography ==
=== Climate ===
Minab has a hot desert climate (Köppen climate classification BWh). Maximum temperature in summers with daytime averages of 37°C (99°F) from May to September while in winters the minimum temperature may drop to 10 °C (50 °F). The annual rainfall is around 124 millimetres (4.9 in). Humidity levels in Minab vary throughout the year, with August being the most humid month at 58%, while May is the least humid at 45%.

Climate data for Minab, Iran
Month	Jan	Feb	Mar	Apr	May	Jun	Jul	Aug	Sep	Oct	Nov	Dec	Year
Record high °C (°F)	30.16 (86.29)	31.23 (88.21)	36.62 (97.92)	39.85 (103.73)	46.31 (115.36)	47.39 (117.30)	47.39 (117.30)	46.31 (115.36)	44.16 (111.49)	42.6 (108.7)	35.54 (95.97)	32.31 (90.16)	47.39 (117.30)
Mean daily maximum °C (°F)	24.36 (75.85)	25.18 (77.32)	28.89 (84.00)	33.87 (92.97)	38.7 (101.7)	41.06 (105.91)	40.99 (105.78)	40.28 (104.50)	39.33 (102.79)	36.27 (97.29)	30.41 (86.74)	26.47 (79.65)	33.82 (92.88)
Daily mean °C (°F)	22.47 (72.45)	23.35 (74.03)	26.85 (80.33)	31.61 (88.90)	36.32 (97.38)	38.71 (101.68)	38.84 (101.91)	38.15 (100.67)	37.01 (98.62)	34.05 (93.29)	28.47 (83.25)	24.48 (76.06)	31.7 (89.1)
Mean daily minimum °C (°F)	19.47 (67.05)	20.47 (68.85)	23.6 (74.5)	27.87 (82.17)	31.99 (89.58)	34.35 (93.83)	35.02 (95.04)	34.55 (94.19)	32.99 (91.38)	30.51 (86.92)	25.24 (77.43)	21.16 (70.09)	28.1 (82.6)
Record low °C (°F)	14.0 (57.2)	10.77 (51.39)	17.23 (63.01)	14.0 (57.2)	26.93 (80.47)	30.16 (86.29)	26.93 (80.47)	26.93 (80.47)	25.85 (78.53)	22.62 (72.72)	14.0 (57.2)	15.08 (59.14)	10.77 (51.39)
Average precipitation mm (inches)	48.0 (1.89)	54.26 (2.14)	30.2 (1.19)	14.96 (0.59)	1.16 (0.05)	0.02 (0.00)	1.22 (0.05)	4.44 (0.17)	0.17 (0.01)	10.24 (0.40)	23.53 (0.93)	23.81 (0.94)	233.81 (9.21)
Average precipitation days	3.33	4.79	3.04	1.56	0.39	0.0	0.39	0.88	0.0	2.06	3.72	2.35	1.87
Average relative humidity (%)	58.83	59.06	58.61	52.85	49.85	54.17	60.95	62.34	58.66	55.48	52.04	48.95	55.98
Average dew point °C (°F)	12 (54)	14 (57)	17 (63)	21 (70)	25 (77)	27 (81)	28 (82)	27 (81)	25 (77)	21 (70)	17 (63)	14 (57)	21 (70)
Mean monthly sunshine hours	283	255	356	415	448	449	448	434	387	386	285	286	4,432
Source: weatherandclimate.com

== Sources ==
- Floor, Willem (2006). A political and economic history of five port cities, 1500-1730. Mage Publishers. ISBN 978-1933823126.
- Potts, Daniel T. (2022). "Mināb". In Yarshater, Ehsan (ed.). Encyclopædia Iranica (Online ed.). Encyclopædia Iranica Foundation. ISBN 978-9004519145.
- Savory, Roger (1998). "Emāmqolī Khan". In Yarshater, Ehsan (ed.). Encyclopædia Iranica (Online ed.). Encyclopædia Iranica Foundation. ISBN 978-1568590585.
- Teles e Cunha, Joao (2009). "Portugal i. Relations with Persia in the Early Modern Age (1500-1750)". In Yarshater, Ehsan (ed.). Encyclopædia Iranica (Online ed.). Encyclopædia Iranica Foundation. ISBN 978-0-933273-95-5.
