= Safavid Bahrain =

District of the Fars province

- 1602–1717; July 1718 – November 1718; 1722–?
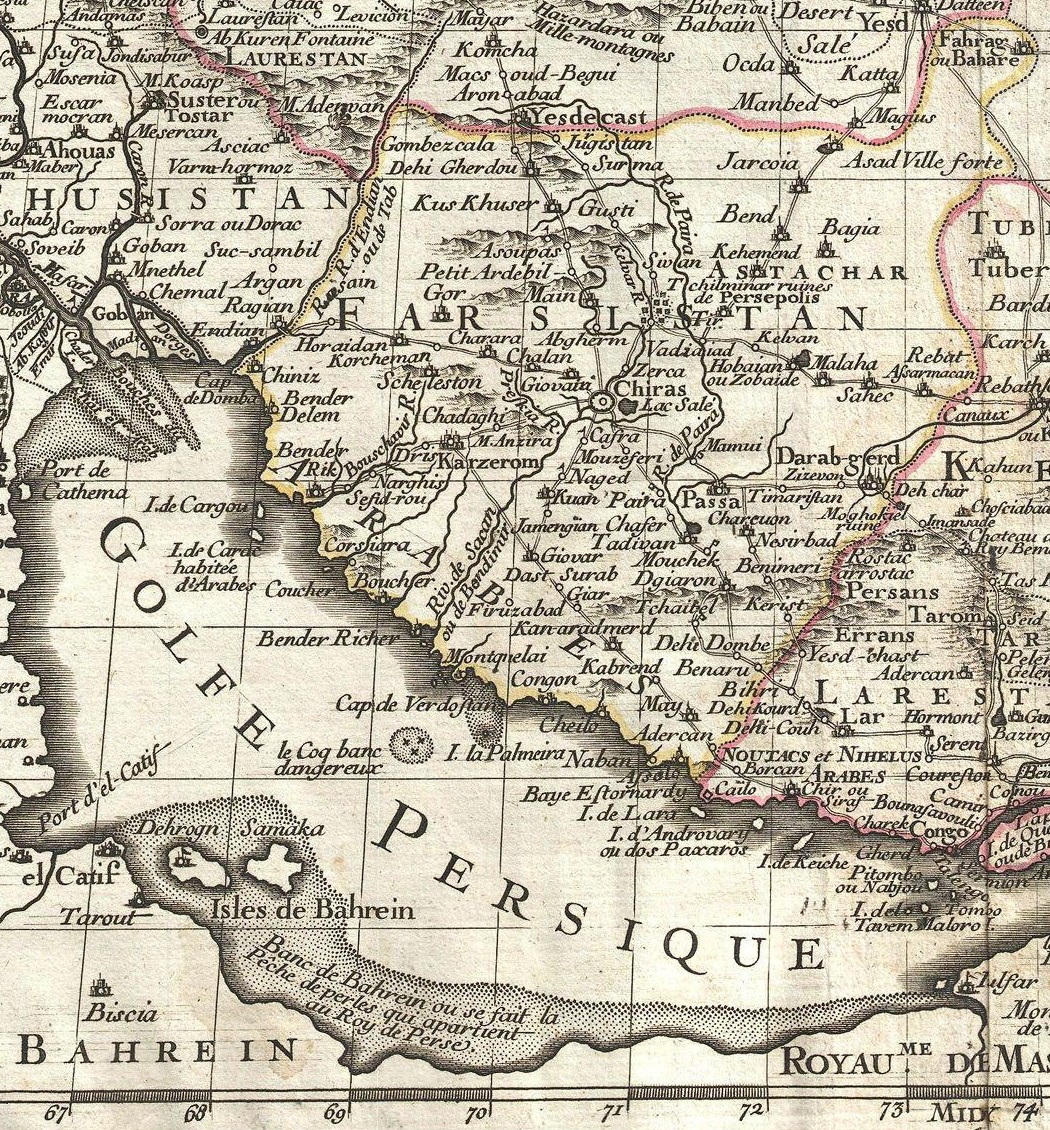
- 1724 map of the Persian Gulf and its surroundings. Bahrain ("Isles de Bahrein") is located to the south, while Fars ("Farsistan") is located to the north
- Status: District of Safavid Fars
- Capital: Bilad Al Qadeem
- Historical era: Early modern period
Preceded by
Kingdom of Hormuz

In Safavid Iran, Bahrain was a district of the Fars province. Its provincial capital was Bilad Al Qadeem, a center of Twelver Shia Islam.

== History ==
Bahrain was a major contact point between the Arab and Iranian spheres. It constituted the crossover between the agricultural and tribal frontiers of the Persian Gulf region. The degree to which Twelver Shia Islam existed in Bahrain before Iranian rule is unclear. A less dogmatic version of the doctrine became established only after the period of Iranian control began.

Bahrain was conquered by the Safavids in 1602 to counter the influence of the Ottoman and Portuguese empires in Iraq and along the southern Iranian coast. The conquest had been carried out by Allahverdi Khan under the orders of Shah Abbas I (r. 1587–1629). Bahrain was subsequently incorporated into the Fars province. This conquest granted the local Twelver Shi'is the liberty to practice their faith openly and build centers of learning. It was during this period that the first Friday prayers using Shia protocols were performed by Shaykh Muhammad ibn Hasan al Maqabi. The oldest religious building in Bahrain, the Khamis Mosque, was highly popular. Due to the efforts of the prominent Shia scholar Shaykh Ali ibn Sulayman al-Bahrani al-Qadami (died 1653), the majority of Bahrainis adopted the Akhbari branch of Twelver Shi'ism.

Bilad Al Qadeem served as the capital and the home of the leading mujtahid. After the Safavid governor, he was the most powerful political figure in Bahrain. Bilad Al Qadeem had a reputation as a hub of Twelver Shia Islam, a status that continued even after the fall of the Safavids. Religious and educational activities were prominent in Bilad Al Qadeem alongside a successful trading sector. The wealth of the local markets was derived from northern Bahrain's agricultural production, specifically from its orchards and its date and vegetable farms.

Between May and September 1715, the Omani ruler Sultan bin Saif II launched an unsuccessful major attack to conquer Bahrain with help from the Qavasem Arabs of Julfar and Qatar. In 1716, Omani forces launched their second assault on Bahrain. This operation first started with a fleet of 15–16 vessels but was later supplemented by 10–12 additional ships and numerous smaller vessels. The total Omani naval force featured one ship of 74 guns along with two ships of 60 guns and one ship of 50 guns. Their fleet also contained 18 smaller vessels carrying between 12–32 guns and several rowing vessels called Trankis equipped with 4–8 guns.

The governor of Bahrain, Mehrab Khan, concluded that he was unable to fight the large Omani force alone, and thus secured the aid of the governor of Dashtestan. With army consisting of Dashtestani, Safavid and local residents, Mehrab Khan defeated the Omanis. Many of Omanis were killed, while the rest withdrew. In 1717, due to scheming by his opponents, Mehrab Khan was dismissed from his office. While the new governor was on his way to Bahrain, a third attack was made by the Omanis. This time the Omani force was possibly up to three to four times larger and consisted of 14 ships in total. They were reinforced and guided by the Sunni Arab tribe of Bani Utbah from Qatar, who were the long-standing rivals of the Bahrainis. The Omanis conquered Bahrain after 45 days of resistance by the locals.

The Safavid administration in Isfahan reacted with great concern following the Omani capture of Bahrain. Sheykh Mohammad ibn Majed headed a delegation to the court in Isfahan to request immediate assistance against Omani hostilities. The delegation made several complaints about the Omanis including their capture of Bahrain, their attacks on pilgrims traveling to Mecca, and the disruption of trade vessels going to India. Shah Soltan Hoseyn (r. 1694–1722) subsequently appointed Lotf-Ali Khan Daghestani as sepahsalar (commander-in-chief) with orders to launch an offensive against Oman and take care of the complaints made by the delegation. In July 1718, Lotf-Ali Khan, leading 6,000 soldiers, recaptured Bahrain. However, in November 1718, most of the Safavid reinforcements in Bahrain were killed by the Omanis, who reoccupied Bahrain.

By the end of 1722, Omani authority had weakened in the Persian Gulf due to succession issues. A chief of the Huwala tribe, Sheikh Jabbareh of Taheri, used this opportunity to capture Bahrain for Soltan Hoseyn. While Jabbareh held nominal loyalty to the Safavids, their government was disintegrating due to their defeats against the Afghan Hotak dynasty. Following the fall of Isfahan in October 1722, the Afghans made Soltan Hoseyn abdicate.

== List of governors ==
This is a list of the known figures who governed Bahrain.

Year	Governor
1602	Behzad Soltan
1633–?	Sevenduk Soltan Zanganeh
?–1641	Baba Beg
?–1660	Badr Khan
1660–?	Zaman Soltan
Before 1696	Baqer Soltan
1696	Mehdiqoli Soltan ibn Baqer Soltan
1714–1717	Mehrab Khan (or Soltan)
1717 – July 1718; November 1718 – 1722	Omani occupation

== Sources ==
- Axworthy, Michael (2006). The Sword of Persia: Nader Shah, from Tribal Warrior to Conquering Tyrant. I.B. Tauris. ISBN 978-1850437062.
- Floor, Willem (2006). A political and economic history of five port cities, 1500-1730. Mage Publishers. ISBN 978-1933823126.
- Floor, Willem (2008). Titles and Emoluments in Safavid Iran: A Third Manual of Safavid Administration, by Mirza Naqi Nasiri. Mage Publishers. ISBN 978-1933823232.
- Fuccaro, Nelida (2009). Histories of City and State in the Persian Gulf: Manama Since 1800. Cambridge University Press. ISBN 978-0300035315.
- Momen, Moojan (1985). An Introduction to Shi'i Islam: The History and Doctrines of Twelver Shi'ism. Yale University Press. ISBN 978-0300035315.
