= Portuguese–Safavid relations =

Diplomatic relations between Portugal and Safavid Iran

- Portugal: Iran

Diplomatic mission
- Expanding influence in the Indian Ocean and Persian Gulf, including Hormuz: Potential alliance with Portugal against its neighbors, particularly the Ottoman Empire, as well as control over Hormuz

Portuguese–Safavid relations extended beyond Iran's borders as both nations engaged in official and unofficial interactions across the Middle East, the Persian Gulf, the Indian Ocean, and India. Safavid Iran was regarded by the Portuguese Empire as a potential ally to deter rival powers from using the Persian Gulf against its interests in the Indian Ocean. At the same time, the Portuguese-ruled parts of India viewed the efforts of the Safavid dynasty to spread Shia Islam as a threat and acted to prevent a possible Shia alliance against their territories.

== Political history ==
=== Background ===
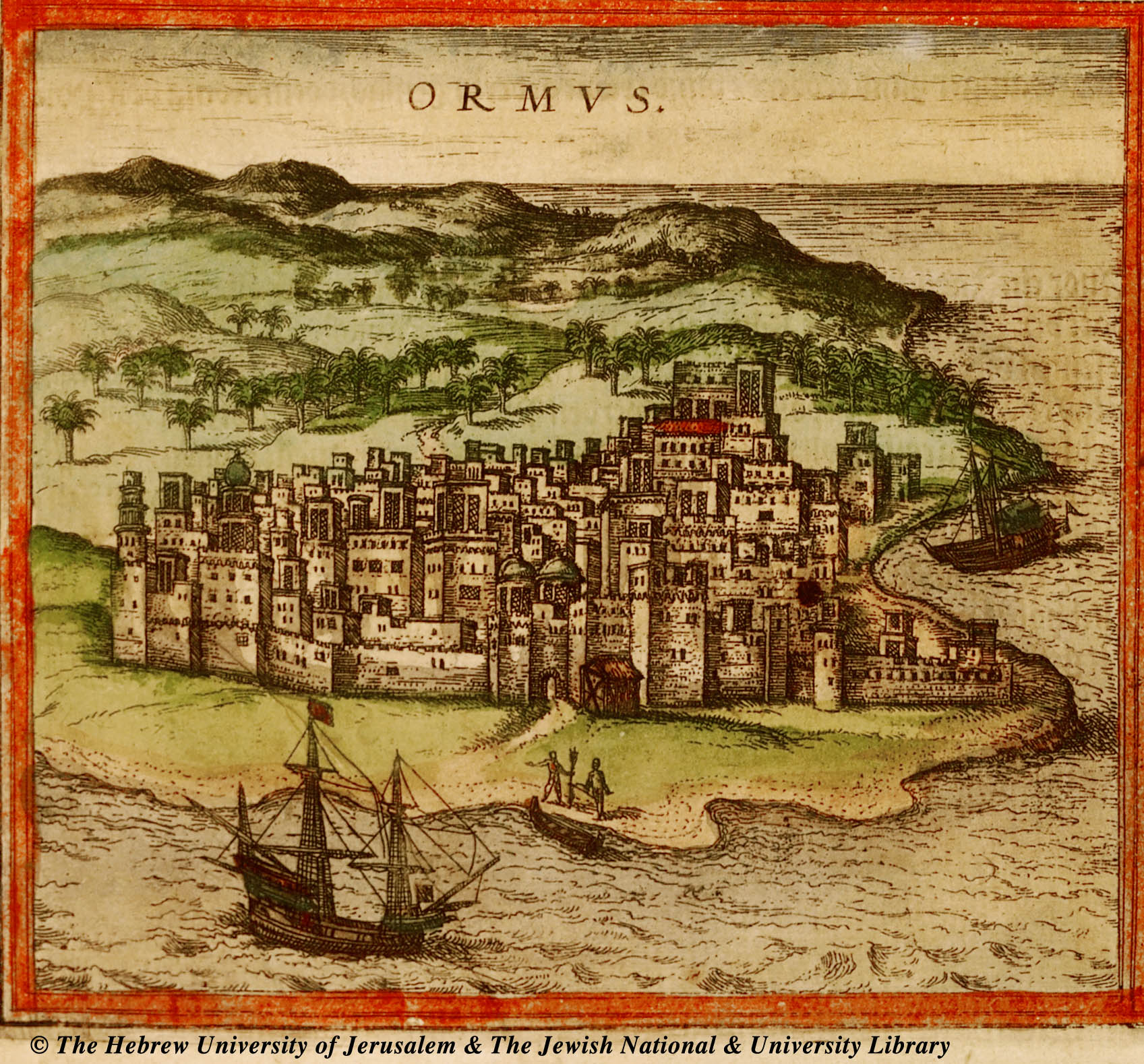
Drawing of Hormuz by Georg Braun, dated 1572

From 1320 until the 17th and early 18th century, the Hormuz Island was the primary naval entry point to the Persian Gulf. It achieved this supremacy by eliminating competing transshipment ports and by ensuring safety in both market operations and along land and maritime trade routes. At the time, both Hormuz Island and its capital city were known as Jarun, while the ruling kingdom was named Hormuz. Gradually, the name Hormuz also came to be used for the island and city, and after the collapse of the kingdom in 1622, it fully replaced the name Jarun. In scholarship, "Hormuz" is commonly used to refer to the kingdom, island and city. People from the Fars province made up the majority of the island's population, while Persian functioned as the primary language, with Arabic, Portuguese, and several other languages also in use. The kingdom's ruling family was of Arab origin, while its administration was mainly composed of Persians. In the 16th and 17th centuries, real power was usually held by the vizier, many of which came from Fal in Fars.

Portuguese knowledge and information about the Iranian world were limited and mostly outdated before their first meeting with Safavid authorities near the Hormuz Island in 1507. Due to the writings of Marco Polo, the Portuguese had some information about Ilkhanate Iran. As Portugal's trading networks expanded across the Mediterranean Sea in the 15th century, they gained more knowledge about Iran. It was first in 1489 that the Portuguese directly interacted with the Iranian world, when the diplomat and explorer Pêro da Covilhã went to the Persian Gulf twice to gather intelligence about the Asian commercial world.

Only the southern edges of the Iranian world are mentioned in Portuguese texts up until 1507. This included the Persian Gulf and the Hormuz Island, which they had considered an important trading place since 1500. Relations between Portugal and Iran emerged from Portuguese activity in the Persian Gulf. The Portuguese presence provoked conflicting opinions among Iranian officials up to 1750, ranging from collaboration to antagonism.

=== Early contacts ===
In 1507, the Portuguese conquered Hormuz, which was controlled by Seyf al-Din Aba Nazar, who had recently become a vassal of Shah Ismail I (r. 1501–1524). Afonso de Albuquerque, who had led the conquest, was visited in Hormuz by Iranian officials from Shiraz. They had come to collect the moqarrariyeh, a tribute paid by Hormuz to its surrounding realms to allow the movement of its goods and enable tax-free trade up to an amount determined by their importance.

At that time, Albuquerque learned about Ismail I's achievements and discovered that he and his Qizilbash followers were Twelver Shia Muslims. Albuquerque thought their prophet was Ali instead of Muhammad, as he was more acquainted with Sunni Islam in the Maghreb. Other Portuguese writers, also confused by Twelver Shia Islam, continued this misinterpretation. Hormuz was lost by Albuquerque in 1508, but he reconquered it in 1515, putting the island under Portuguese "protectorate". This would last until 1622, and caused a dispute with Iran, which considered Hormuz to be their vassal.

=== Attempts at cooperation against the Mamluk Sultanate and early tensions over Hormuz (1510–1524) ===
Both countries had established collaborations and maintained diplomatic contacts in India since 1510, even though they did not interact directly on Iranian territory until 1514. Beginning in 1504, Ismail I became the object of European diplomatic efforts, particularly by the Republic of Venice and the Papal States, which attempted to form alliances with him. The goals of the Portuguese sometimes differed from other European nations.

Because Portugal and the Mamluk Sultanate were competing for control of the Asian spice trade to Europe, the Portuguese were more concerned with the Mamluks than with the Ottoman Empire, who were the main adversary of Southern Europe at the start of the 16th century. The Portuguese were becoming increasingly worried by reports of the Mamluks assembling a navy in the Indian Ocean. Since Ismail I was also pursuing expansionist projects against the Mamluks, he appeared to be a useful ally. Both Ismail I and the Portuguese king Manuel I (r. 1495–1521) planned conquests with messianic intent, and eventually made an alliance. The alliance was made easier by Albuquerque's earlier appointment as governor of the Portuguese-ruled parts of India in 1509, since he was a major promoter of Portugal's policies throughout Asia.

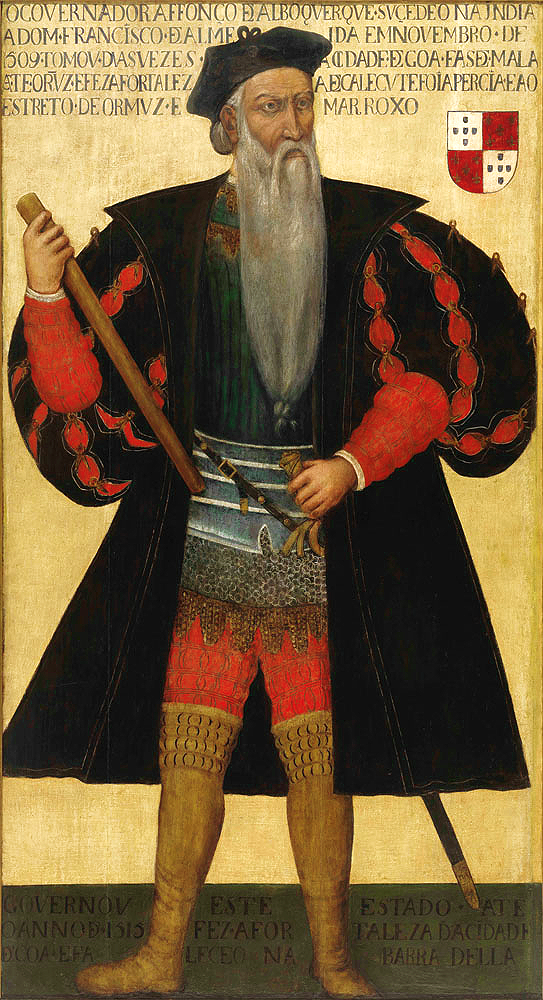
Portrait of Afonso de Albuquerque, who led the Portuguese conquest of the Hormuz Island in 1508 and 1515

After the Portuguese conquest of Goa in 1510, Albuquerque was informed of Ismail I's ambition to expand into India by one of the latters diplomats, Amir Khvajeh. This was also further proven by the continuous activity of Iranian diplomats at the Deccani courts, and made Albuquerque worried. Nevertheless, the desire of an Iranian–Portuguese alliance grew stronger, and Albuquerque sent a second diplomatic group led by Miguel Ferreira in 1514–1515, following the first unsuccessful one in 1511.

Due to Ismail I's defeat against the Ottomans at the Battle of Chaldiran in 1514, the Portuguese diplomatic group failed to fulfill their goals. However, Ferreira did not learn of the event at Chaldiran until he departed Iran in 1515 with Khvajeh Ali Khan, another Iranian diplomat. Before Ferreira left Iran, Albuquerque had dispatched his nephew Përo de Albuquerque to obtain the latest information on Safavid development in the Persian Gulf. It was revealed that the ruler of Hormuz, Turanshah V (r. 1514–1522), had officially become a subject of Ismail I. To prevent the Safavid annexation of Hormuz, which would have undermined his plans to trade horses with India, Albuquerque recaptured the island in 1515. He quickly had the Fort Nossa Senhora da Conceição fortress constructed in Hormuz, which had original started as a tower in 1507. Its establishment represented Portuguese imperialism to the Safavids. Albuquerque's capture of Hormuz and establishment of a fortress there made Ismail I furious.

In an effort to highlight Manuel I's authority and grandeur, Albuquerque arranged a lavish reception for Khvajeh Ali Khan. A similar diplomatic tactic had previously been attempted by Ferreira at Ismail I's court, though it had been unsuccessful. While still in Hormuz, Albuquerque sent Fernão Gomes de Lemos to arrange an agreement with Ismail I against the Mamluks in 1515–1516, in which Manuel I would receive Jerusalem and Ismail I would receive Medina and Mecca. This would allow Ismail I to declare himself the leader of the Islamic world, and Manuel I to declare himself the leader of the Christian world.

Albuquerque was not informed about Chaldiran until the delegation of Lemos had left for Iran, which, according to the modern Portuguese historian Joao Teles e Cunha, made Albuquerque perhaps discover "that the shah was not the ally his king had thought him to be." On 5 May 1515, Lemos left Hormuz and reached Maragheh on 23 August 1515, where Ismail I was staying. They were unable to reach an agreement, since Ismail I had recently suffered defeats against the Ottomans in the west and the Khanate of Bukhara in the east, thereby delaying any potential attack on the Mamluks indefinitely. Ismail I's representative Ebrahim Beg also informed Lemos that they were unhappy with the Portuguese capture of Hormuz. On 8 September 1515, during another discussion, Ismail I's vakil (vicegerent) Mirza Shah Hossein complained to Lemos about the Portuguese capture of Hormuz, claiming that it was a Safavid land and that it had paid them 2,000 ashrafis a year. He said that the Portuguese had not acted as friends, despite their claims to the contrary. Nevertheless, Mirza Shah Hossein and Ismail I still wanted an alliance with the Portuguese.

Mirza Shah Hossein told Lemos that Ismail I would only fight the Mamluks once he had dealt with the Ottomans, and thus requested gunners and cannon founders from them. Mirza Shah Hossein also said that Albuquerque had pledged to use Portuguese ships to carry 12,000 Safavid troops to Bahrain and Qatif, which had rebelled against the Safavids. In a later discussion, Lemos said the Portuguese captain of Hormuz needed Albuquerque's approval to provide ships to Ismail I, but he had already left for India. Ismail I considered this to be an excuse. After Albuquerque's death in 1515, he was succeeded by Lopo Soares de Albergaria, a member of a faction opposed to King Manuel I's plans for Jerusalem, which marked the end of the prospect of an alliance between Ismail I and Portugal.

During the local revolt against the Portuguese in the Persian Gulf in 1521–1523, Turan Shah IV requested the aid of Ismail I in 1522, sending him the first payment of moqarrariyeh since 1515. At the start of 1523, the Safavids blocked caravan routes supplying Hormuz, disrupting its trade and reducing its income. Instead of interfering in the events in Hormuz, a diplomat from Ismail I arrived to request all the previous unpaid moqarrariyeh. The Safavid forces lifted the blockade after its commander was paid. Due to the interfering by the Safavids, the Portuguese sent an embassy under Balthasar Pessoa to Ismail I in 1523. While Pessoa was waiting for an audience in Tabriz, Ismail I died on 24 May 1524. He was succeeded by his eldest son Shah Tahmasp I (r. 1524–1576), whose representatives told Pessoa that the shah refused to make any concessions.

=== Unstable partnership (1524–1602) ===
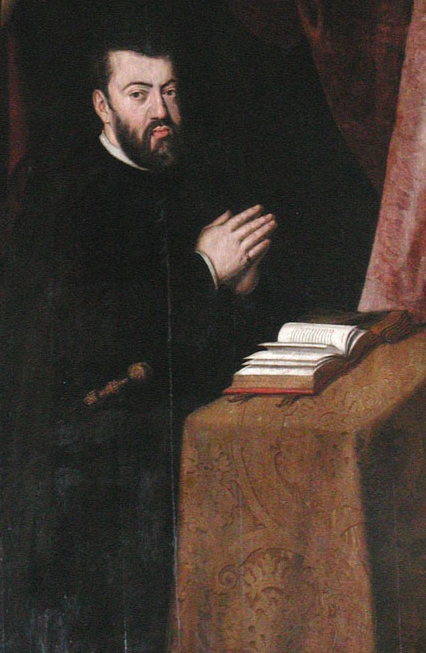
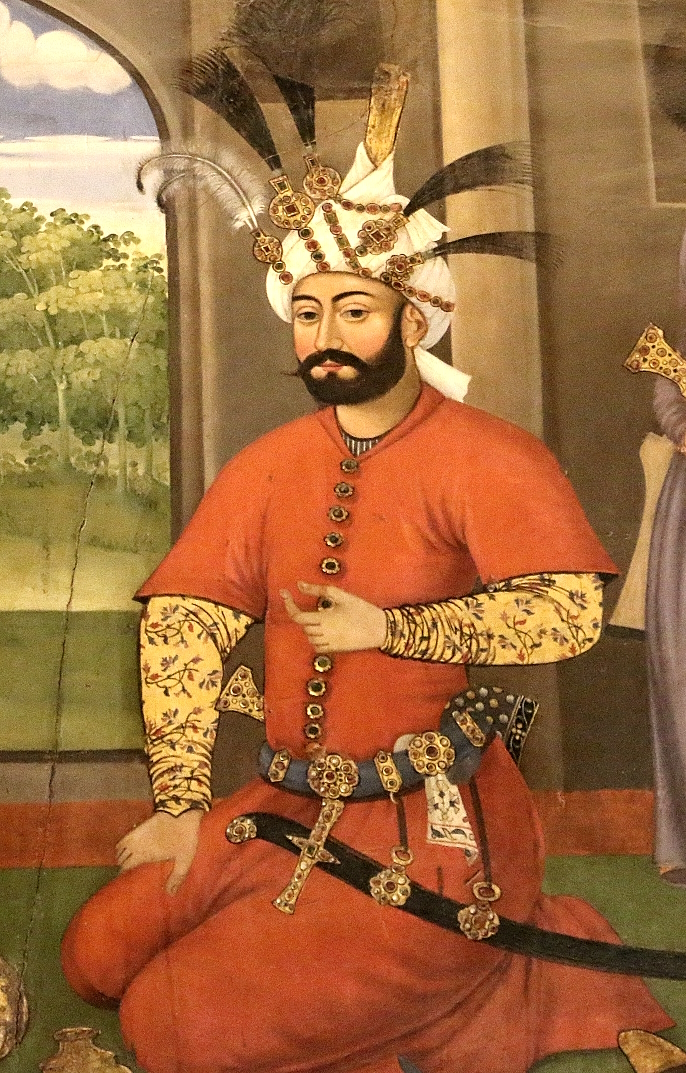
Left: John III (r. 1521–1557), the king of Portugal
Right: Shah Tahmasp I (r. 1524–1576), the shah of Iran

The new Portuguese king John III (r. 1521–1557) abandoned his father's messianic goals in favor of a more calculated strategy to strengthen Portuguese authority. As the Ottomans worked to keep trade connections intact between spice-producing regions and their Levantine ports, their expansion in the Middle East created a challenge for John III and put Portuguese interests in the Indian Ocean at risk.

In 1534–1535, during his stay in Baghdad, the Ottoman sultan Suleiman the Magnificent (r. 1520–1566) secured the loyalty of several rulers in the Persian Gulf, some of whom had previously acknowledged Portuguese authority, marking a shift in the balance of power in the Middle East by the mid 1530s. The Portuguese also became vulnerable to attacks through the Persian Gulf after the Ottomans captured a port there. By that point, the European countries saw Iran as a potential ally against the Ottomans. Since 1533, Tahmasp I had ruled independently and initiated a series of military, administrative, and political reforms to reinforce his authority. Despite this, the Safavid army lacked the resources to match the Ottomans.

==== Rebellion in Rishahr (1534 and 1539–1540) ====
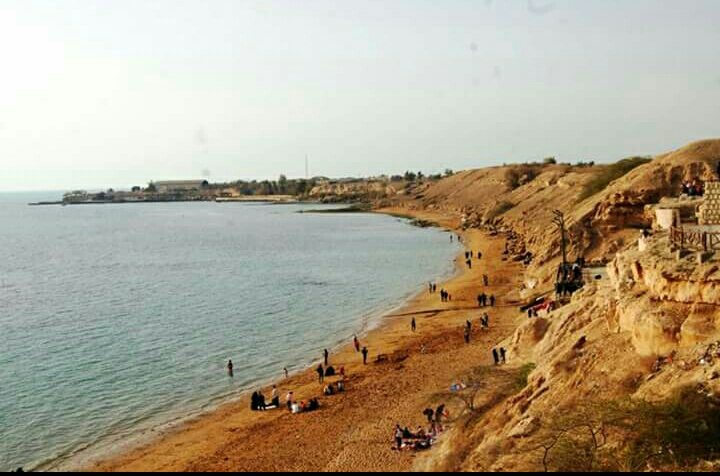
The shores of Rishahr

Throughout his rule, Tahmasp I generally had an unclear and indifferent stance towards the Portuguese. Although he still declined to cancel his alliance with the Portuguese at the request of Badr Bu Tuwayrik (r. 1516–1569/70), the emir of Hadhramaut, in the southern part of the Arabian Peninsula. With the exception of the two Portuguese operations against Rishahr in 1534 and 1540, Tahmasp I very rarely valued his alliance with the Portuguese. Shah Ali Soltan, the Safavid governor of Rishahr, had rebelled in April 1534 and began targeting the shipping routes. According to Portuguese records, Shah Ali Soltan was a vassal of the king of Hormuz.

At the request of the king of Hormuz, Mohammad Shah II, a Portuguese expedition under Jorge de Castro was sent to Rishahr. Their water supplies ran out before they reached Rishahr, forcing them to go ashore to find water. There, fifty of them were captured and many were killed by 300 armed Arabs. The expedition then returned to Hormuz. A second expedition was afterwards sent under Francisco de Gouvea, which reached Rishahr. There he reached an agreement with its governor that the latter would no longer have to pay tribute in return for complying with the king of Hormuz.

At the start of 1539, a rebellion was started in Rishahr by Hasan Soltan Rishahri and his brother Shah Ali. The Safavid force under Ghazi Khan Dhu'l-Qadr was unable to capture Rishahr due to the fortifications of the city, as well as their own lack of ships and attacks by local Arab groups encouraged by Hasan Soltan. In mid-1539, the Portuguese captain of Hormuz was asked by Ghazi Khan, on behalf of Tahmasp I, to provide naval assistance in order to break the deadlock against Rishahr.

Rumours suggested that Hasan Soltan had requested help from the Ottomans, a possibility that worried the Portuguese, alongside their concerns about Tahmasp I's diplomatic ties with the Deccan kingdoms in India, many of which were Shias. The Portuguese may have also expected Tahmasp I to owe them by helping him. Due to these factors, the Portuguese helped by establishing a blockade of Rishahr in October–November 1539. The blockade lasted three months, during which only the soldiers in Rishahr received the available food, reportedly leading to the deaths of 5,000 civilians. In February 1540, Hasan Soltan capitulated, and was subsequently executed by the Safavids, who installed a new governor in Rishahr.

==== Safavid involvement in Moghostan (1542–1545) ====
In 1542, the king of Hormuz, Salghur Shah II, died. His appointed successor was his 12-year-old son Turan Shah V, who was in Goa. However, Turan Shah V was told by Hormuz's Portuguese captain Luís Falcão that his succession first needed the approval of the Portuguese government in India. Turan Shah V's vizier was Rokn al-Din Mahmud ibn Ra'is Shehab al-Din.

The uncertainty regarding the next ruler of Hormuz was exploited by the governor of Shiraz (the capital city of Fars), Ebrahim Khan Dhu'l-Qadr. Leading 10,000 cavalry, he attacked Birunat. He framed his attempt to seize strategic forts on the trade route as an effort to collect overdue fiscal payments. Lashtan, Shamil, Minab, and other important forts were among those he sought to capture. His vassal Soltan Ala mainly led the operations, causing much destruction in the coastal region.

Ebrahim Khan sent a respectful letter to the governor of Portuguese India, Martim Afonso de Sousa. Since his intentions were unclear, the Portuguese responded by sending an envoy, Aleixo Carvalho, who spoke Persian, to investigate the situation. Rokn al-Din Mahmud, acting for Turan Shah V, was sent to the border with many troops.

While discussions began near the frontier, Ebrahim Khan ordered his commanders to advance toward the forts of Manujan and Minab. An initial Safavid force of roughly 300 Turkmen cavalry launched an attack, but a volley of musket fire from the defenders forced them to retreat. They were later reinforced by 3,000 Safavid troops, but did not make another attack. After Turan Shah V and Luís Falcão reached Hormuz, diplomatic exchanges resumed, and Ebrahim Khan returned to Shiraz. Carvalho was sent to Shiraz, where he negotiated peace with the Safavid authorities. Despite this, he reported that Tahmasp I had appointed a new governor of Moghestan, which was part of the Kingdom of Hormuz and important to Portuguese interests. In August 1545, as part of a peace treaty concluded with Rokn al-Din Mahmud, Ebrahim Khan received 10,000 pardaus.

==== Attempts at cooperating against the Ottoman Empire (1550) and (1565–1568) ====
Especially between 1545 and 1555, the Safavids were forced to shift their trade toward Hormuz because the traditional overland routes to the Levant were severed by Ottoman wars. This transition led to frequent diplomatic and customs disputes with the Portuguese. Tahmasp I used the moqarrariyeh system to justify his involvement in Hormuz's commerce, persistently pressure the Portuguese for his share of the revenue, and assert Iranian sovereignty over the region.

Under orders from John III, the Portuguese official Jorge Cabral sent an embassy led by Enrique de Macedo to Tahmasp I in 1550. The mission aimed to forge a coalition to challenge Ottoman control over Basra. In August 1550, while Macedo was in Tabriz, a Safavid envoy from Hormuz complained to Tahmasp I, claiming that the Portuguese in Chaul had stolen much of his wealth from him and forced his wife and daughter to adopt Christianity. In response, Tahmasp I did not allow Macedo to leave and demanded the Portuguese authorities in Hormuz to resolve the issue or he would declare war.

The Portuguese captain of Hormuz managed to de-escalate the situation. He sent a reply stating that the conversions were voluntary and that the family was not in Hormuz, as well as highlighting the friendly relations between Iran and Portugal. Although Tahmasp I was still upset, he considered the response sufficient and let Macedo go.

Gulbenkian suggested that Tahmasp I's decision might have been influenced by the Ottomans attempt to improve their relations with the Portuguese, but the Iranologist Willem Floor considers it to be "unlikely", as the Ottomans were attacking Hormuz during that period. Tahmasp I favored Portuguese control of Hormuz over Ottoman control, prompting him to propose a joint assault on Qatif, but it was never carried out.

Preoccupied with Ottomans on his western frontier, Tahmasp I did not pay attention subsequent Ottoman attempts to expel the Portuguese from the Persian Gulf in 1552–1560. Between 1565–1568, the Habsburg monarchy, Spain, Portugal, and the Papal States tried to form a military alliance with Iran to force the Ottoman Empire into a two-front war. Because Ottoman control made the land route too dangerous for an embassy, the Habsburg monarchy and Spain planned for the appointed ambassador, Richard Shelley, to travel to Iran through Moscow, Kazan, and Astrakhan, and return through Hormuz.

Ultimately, the alliance failed to take place due to slow negotiations and conflicting interests between the three European powers. The Ottomans, who did not like to fight at two fronts, signed a peace treaty with the Habsburg monarchy in 1568.

== Views and exchanges ==
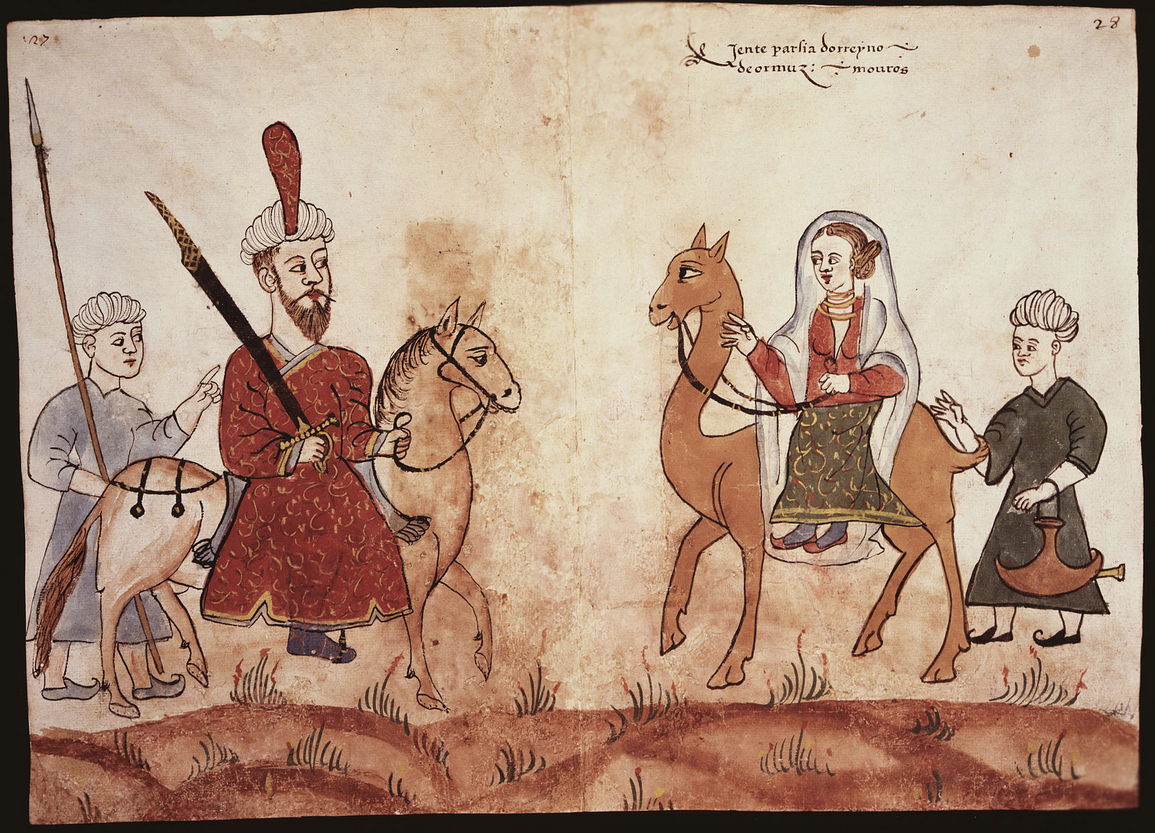
Iranians from Hormuz, from the anonymous 16th century Portuguese Códice Casanatense

Throughout 250 years, politics was the most important aspect of Iran–Portugal relations, even though they rarely had the same objectives at the same time, and even less frequently achieved them. Because Persian was widely used in commerce across the Indian Ocean, languages mixed through contact. The Portuguese adopted some Persian words, such as "xabandar" (shāhbandar, port official), or "sodagar" (sowdāgar, merchant). In India, Persian was used by the Portuguese in diplomatic affairs until the 19th century. Persian-speaking personnel were hired by the Portuguese authorities in Iran and India for this purpose, but eventually natives, primarily Indians and some Armenians, were given all these roles. As a result, India was the primary source of Persian loanwords into Portuguese, an exchange that continued until the 20th century. Meanwhile, the Portuguese had less of an impact on Iranian culture, and probably fifteen Portuguese loanwords have been adapted into Persian.

Interest in European art and technology developed slowly in Safavid Iran, unlike in Mughal India. European influence on Persian painting was already noticeable in the mid 16th century, but it only emerged as a distinct style (Farangi-Sazi) in c. 1650, in which the Portuguese played no part. Portugal received textiles, carpets, ceramics, tiles, and other items from Iran, but it had less to do with exchanges of culture and more to do with commercial and consumer practices.

Because there was very little direct trade with Iranians outside of Hormuz, and Portuguese traders made up only a small minority there, the Portuguese likely had fewer encounters with Iranians than the Dutch and the English. As a result, Portuguese interest in and knowledge of Iran and its culture was inaccurate, lacking depth and clouded by religious bias, similar to how they were viewed by the Iranians. The Portuguese are rarely mentioned in Safavid-era chronicles, and when they are, it is usually in a negative context. The Iranians saw them as sea robbers who lived near the coast, a typical Asian view of Portugal. The Portuguese would also be portrayed as "infidel Franks" by Muslim Safavid authors. Western Europeans were rarely mentioned in Safavid-era texts. There is little mention of Europe (Farangestan) as a competitor, threat, or point of comparison, even long after the Safavid dynasty. European figures appear in Safavid-era texts almost exclusively through brief mentions of Portuguese diplomats visiting the shah. Secondary sources, typically from Europe, provide the majority of the information regarding Safavid views on Europeans.

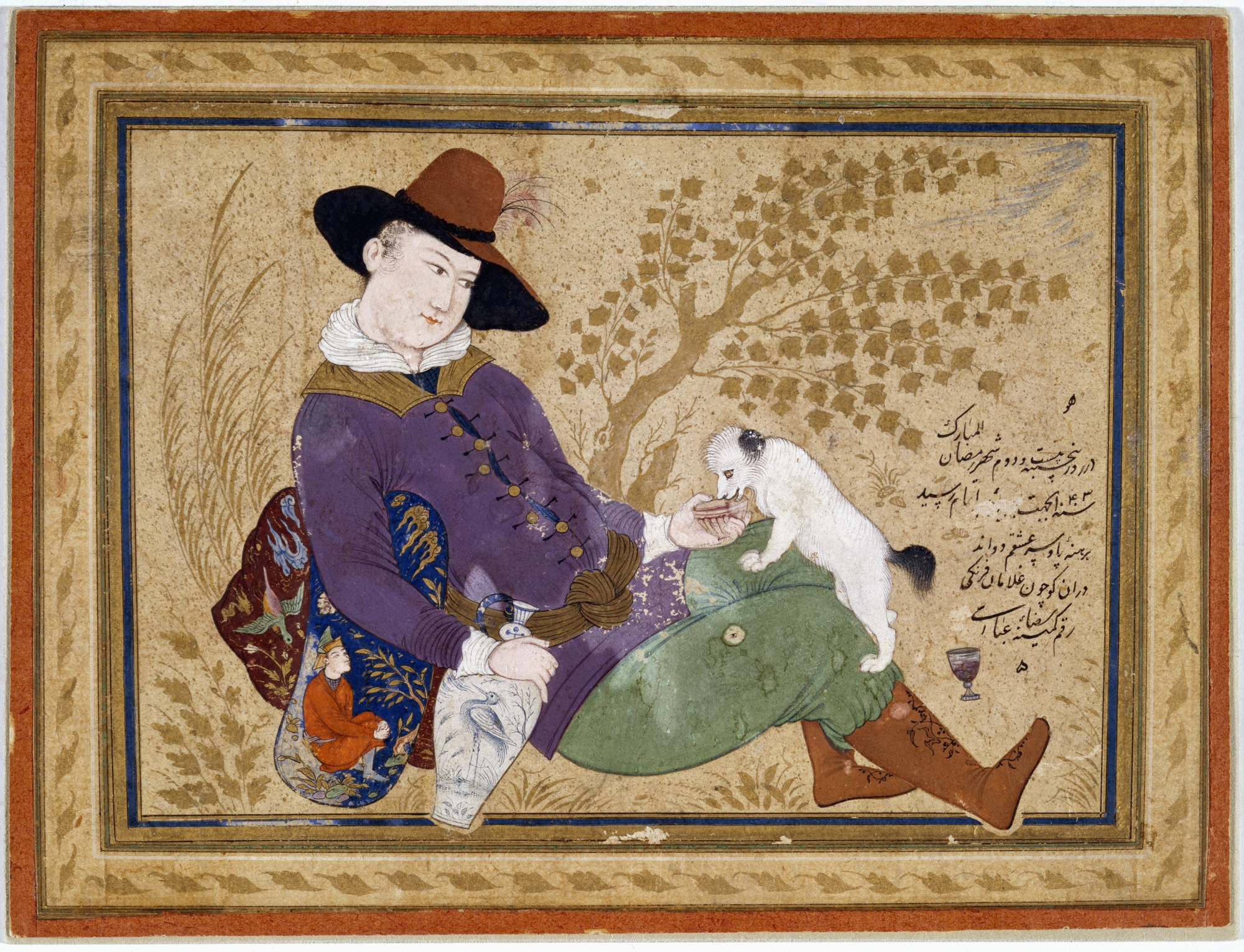
A young Portuguese man by Iranian artist Reza Abbasi, dated 1634

There were many inconsistencies in the Iranian viewpoint of Western Europeans, including the Portuguese. While the Safavid elite distrusted the Portuguese, they were nevertheless intrigued by their ships, weapons, techniques and people. Ismail I laughed when one of his Qizilbash officers wearing a European cuirass fell, whereas Iskandar Beg Munshi praised the fortifications in Hormuz as a unique display of Western expertise. Western clothing caught the attention of Ismail I's court, and one of his men, claimed to be a Frank while dressed in Portuguese clothing. During the reign of Shah Abbas I (r. 1587–1629), the Portuguese were portrayed in miniatures created by the renowned Iranian artist Reza Abbasi and his students, demonstrating the interest of the Safavid elite towards foreigners.

== Sources ==
- Floor, Willem (2006). A political and economic history of five port cities, 1500-1730. Mage Publishers. ISBN 978-1933823126.
- Floor, Willem (2008). Titles and Emoluments in Safavid Iran: A Third Manual of Safavid Administration, by Mirza Naqi Nasiri. Mage Publishers. ISBN 978-1933823232.
- Floor, Willem (2021). "Commercial Relations between Safavid Persia and Western Europe". In Melville, Charles (ed.). Safavid Persia in the Age of Empires: The Idea of Iran. Vol. 10. I.B. Tauris. pp. 267–290.
- Matthee, Rudi (2021). "The idea of Iran in the Safavid period: Dynastic pre-eminence and Urban Pride". In Melville, Charles (ed.). Safavid Persia in the Age of Empires: The Idea of Iran. Vol. 10. I.B. Tauris. pp. 81–105.
- Teles e Cunha, Joao (2009). "Portugal i. Relations with Persia in the Early Modern Age (1500-1750)". In Yarshater, Ehsan (ed.). Encyclopædia Iranica (Online ed.). Encyclopædia Iranica Foundation. ISBN 978-0-933273-95-5.
