= Pedro Mascarenhas =

Portuguese explorer and colonial administrator

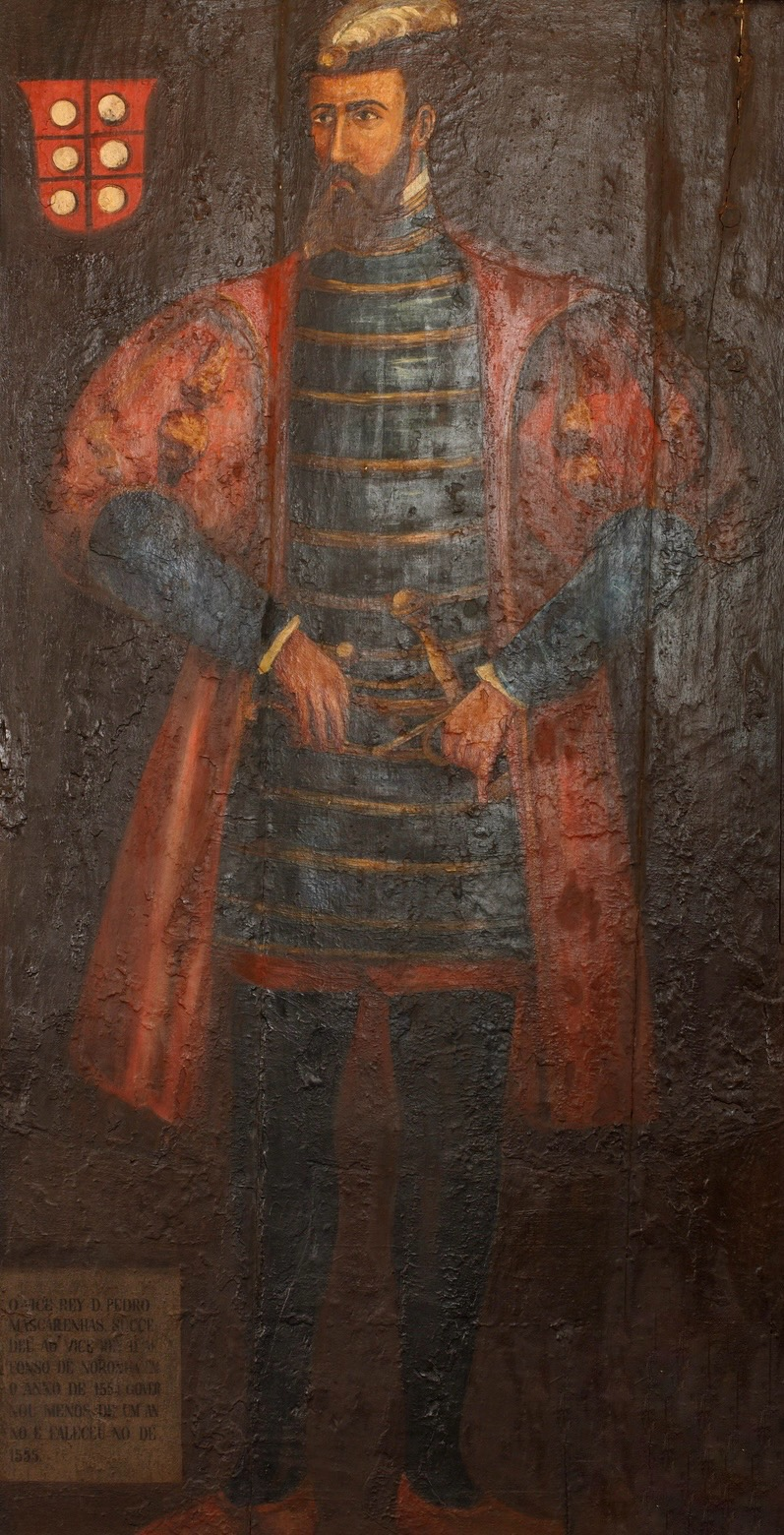
- Portrait c. 1554–1555

Captain-major of Portuguese Malacca
- In office 1525–1526
- Monarch: John III of Portugal
- Preceded by: Jorge de Albuquerque
- Succeeded by: Jorge Cabral

Viceroy of Portuguese India
- In office 1554–1555
- Monarch: John III of Portugal
- Preceded by: Afonso de Noronha
- Succeeded by: Francisco Barreto

Personal details
- Born: 1470 Mértola, Kingdom of Portugal
- Died: 16 June 1555 (aged 84–85) Goa, Portuguese India

D. Pedro Mascarenhas (1480 – 16 June 1555) was a Portuguese explorer and colonial administrator. He was the first European to discover the island of Diego Garcia in the Indian Ocean in 1512. He also encountered the Indian Ocean island of Mauritius in 1512, although he may not have been the first Portuguese explorer to do so; earlier expeditions by Diogo Dias and Afonso de Albuquerque along with Diogo Fernandes Pereira may have encountered the islands. In 1528 explorer Diogo Rodrigues (after whom the island of Rodrigues is named) named the islands of Réunion, Mauritius, and Rodrigues the Mascarene Islands, after the name of Mascarenhas.

He was ambassador from Portugal to the Holy See, where he appealed to Pope Paul III for the coming of the first jesuits for the Portuguese missions in India, at request of King John III and Diogo de Gouveia. His mission ended on 15 March 1540, when he travelled back to Portugal together with Francis Xavier. After this, he served in the Portuguese court and took a special role in the education and household of Prince John, the son of John III of Portugal. He was also involved by the King in the Portuguese withdrawal from Moroccan fortresses in 1549. In 1554, King John III forced him for the post of viceroy of India. Mascarenhas tried to resist, arguing with his age but the King forced him to accept the post.

He was viceroy at Goa, capital of the Portuguese possessions in Asia, from 1554 until his death in 1555, in Goa. He was succeeded as viceroy by Francisco Barreto. While viceroy of Portuguese India, at the direction of the King of Portugal he sent Fr. James Dias and Fr. Gonçalo Rodrigues to Ethiopia in order to determine whether Emperor Galawdewos would be receptive to receiving a Patriarch anointed by the Roman Catholic church.

== Bibliography ==
O Vice-Reinado de D. Afonso de Noronha (1550-1554): Perspectivas Políticas da Ásia Portuguesa em meados de Quinhentos.

Preceded by Afonso de Noronha	Viceroy of Portuguese India; 1554 – June 1555	Succeeded by Francisco Barreto
