= Portuguese expeditions to Reishahr =

Date	1534
Location	Reishahr (Modern day Bushehr), Iran
Result	Portuguese victory

Belligerents
Portuguese Empire	Reishahr rebels

Commanders and leaders
Jorge de Castro; Francisco de Gouveia	Shah Ali Sultan (surrendered)

The Portuguese expeditions to Reishahr were two military operations launched in 1534 against Shah Ali Sultan, the governor of Reishahr, who was attacking Ormus shipping.

== First expedition ==
After the conquest of Shiraz, Shah Ismail I appointed Mir Abu Ishaq governor of Reishahr, Abu Ishaq began attacking Ormus shipping, and he became a target to the Portuguese. After the Battle of Chaldiran, Abu Ishaq saw the opportunity to free himself from the Safavid yoke and decided to share his spoil with Afonso de Albuquerque. The city of Reishahr was important as it was a wheat supplier for Ormus. Mir Abu Ishaq had been succeeded by his son, Shah Ali Sultan.

In April 1534, Shah Ali Sultan, called a vassal of Ormus by Portuguese sources, rebelled and resumed his attacks on Ormus shipping. The king of Ormus, Muhammad Shah II, asked for help from the Portuguese governor of Hormuz, António da Silveira, to get rid of him and his vessels. Antonio dispatched Jorge de Castro with a force of two galiots, two fustas, and 100 men. Antonio felt that the force was weak and dispatched another force of 5 vessels and 100 men.

The Portuguese force ran into contrary winds for 20 days. The water supplies for the Portuguese ran out. They stopped near Reishahr and went ashore to fetch some water which they did. Few people who lived there escaped to the mountains. Later on the same day, a body of 300 armed Arabs coming from the mountains attacked the Portuguese who killed many of the landing party and captured 50 of them. Hearing this, Jorge was displeased and returned to Ormus.

== Second expedition ==
Later, the Portuguese dispatched another expedition under Francisco de Gouveia, this time Shah Ali Sultan surrendered and agreed to submit, provided he did not have to pay his fiscal arrears. This was accepted, and the Portuguese captives were returned.

== Sources ==
- Willem M. Floor (2006), The Persian Gulf: A Political and Economic History of Five Port Cities 1500–1730.
- Daniel T. Potts (2023), A contribution to the location of the Late Antique settlements known as Rēw-Ardašīr or Rēšahr. Sasanian Studies/Sasanidische Studien 2.
- Gaspar Corrêa (1862), Lendas da India, Vol III.
