= Ghazi Khan Dhu'l-Qadr =

Safavid governor of Fars from 1533 to 1540

Ghazi Khan (or Qadi) Dhu'l-Qadr was the Safavid-appointed governor of the Fars province from 1533 to 1540.

== Biography ==
Ghazi Khan was a member of the Dhu'l-Qadr tribe, who always held the governorship of Fars until 1590, except two short periods in 1505 and 1509. His predecessor was Hamzeh Beg Jameselu Dhu'l-Qadr. At the start of 1539, a rebellion was started in Rishahr by Hasan Soltan Rishahri and his brother Shah Ali. The Safavid force under Ghazi Khan was unable to capture Rishahr due to the fortifications of the city, as well as their own lack of ships and attacks by local Arab groups encouraged by Hasan Soltan. In mid-1539, the Portuguese captain of the Hormuz Island was asked by Ghazi Khan, on behalf of Shah Tahmasp I (r. 1524–1576), to provide naval assistance in order to break the deadlock against Rishahr.

The Portuguese helped by establishing a blockade of Rishahr in October–November 1539. The blockade lasted three months, during which only the soldiers in Rishahr received the available food, reportedly leading to the deaths of 5,000 civilians. In February 1540, Hasan Soltan capitulated, and was subsequently taken by Ghazi Khan to the Safavid court, where he was executed. While they had been on their way, Ghazi Khan died. He was succeeded by Ebrahim Khan Dhu'l-Qadr.

== Sources ==
- Floor, Willem (2006). A political and economic history of five port cities, 1500-1730. Mage Publishers. ISBN 978-1933823126.
- Floor, Willem (2008). Titles and Emoluments in Safavid Iran: A Third Manual of Safavid Administration, by Mirza Naqi Nasiri. Mage Publishers. ISBN 978-1933823232.

Preceded by Hamzeh Beyg Jameselu Dhu'l-Qadr	Governor of the Fars province 1533–1540	Succeeded by Ebrahim Khan Dhu'l-Qadr
