= Ebrahim Khan Dhu'l-Qadr =

Ebrahim Khan Dhu'l-Qadr was the Safavid-appointed governor of the Fars province from 1540 to 1555.

== Biography ==
Ebrahim Khan was a member of the Dhu'l-Qadr tribe, who always held the governorship of Fars until 1590, except two short periods in 1505 and 1509. In 1540, he was installed as the governor of Fars, succeeding Ghazi Khan Dhu'l-Qadr. During his governorship, he was the laleh (guardian) of Suleiman, a son of Shah Tahmasp I (r. 1524–1576). His vizier was the father of the later influential statesman Mirza Salman Jaberi.

In 1542, the ruler of the Kingdom of Hormuz, Salghur Shah II, died. His appointed successor was his 12-year-old son Turan Shah V, who was in Portuguese-ruled Goa. However, Turan Shah V was told by Hormuz's Portuguese captain Luís Falcão that his succession first needed the approval of the Portuguese government in India.

The uncertainty regarding the next ruler of Hormuz was exploited by Ebrahim Khan. Leading 10,000 cavalry, he attacked Birunat. He framed his attempt to seize strategic forts on the trade route as an effort to collect overdue fiscal payments. Lashtan, Shamil, Minab, and other important forts were among those he sought to capture. His vassal Soltan Ala mainly led the operations, causing much destruction in the coastal region.

Ebrahim Khan had sent a respectful letter to the governor of Portuguese India, Martim Afonso de Sousa. Since his intentions were unclear, the Portuguese responded by sending an envoy, Aleixo Carvalho, who spoke Persian, to investigate the situation. The vizier Rokn al-Din Mahmud ibn Ra'is Shehab al-Din, acting for Turan Shah V, was sent to the border with many troops.

While discussions began near the frontier, Ebrahim Khan ordered his commanders to advance toward the forts of Manujan and Minab. An initial Safavid force of roughly 300 Turkmen cavalry launched an attack, but a volley of musket fire from the defenders forced them to retreat. They were later reinforced by 3,000 Safavid troops, but did not make another attack. After Turan Shah V and Luís Falcão reached Hormuz, diplomatic exchanges resumed, and Ebrahim Khan returned to Shiraz. Carvalho was sent to Shiraz, where he negotiated peace with the Safavid authorities. Despite this, he reported that Tahmasp I had appointed a new governor of Moghestan, which was part of the Kingdom of Hormuz and important to Portuguese interests. In August 1545, as part of a peace treaty concluded with Rokn al-Din Mahmud, Ebrahim Khan received 10,000 pardaus.

In 1555, Ebrahim Khan was succeeded by Ali Soltan Tati-oghlu Dhu'l-Qadr, who became the new guardian of Suleiman.

== Sources ==
- Floor, Willem (2006). A political and economic history of five port cities, 1500-1730. Mage Publishers. ISBN 978-1933823126.
- Floor, Willem (2008). Titles and Emoluments in Safavid Iran: A Third Manual of Safavid Administration, by Mirza Naqi Nasiri. Mage Publishers. ISBN 978-1933823232.
- Mitchell, Colin Paul (2007). "Jāberi". In Yarshater, Ehsan (ed.). Encyclopædia Iranica (Online ed.). Encyclopædia Iranica Foundation. ISBN 978-1934283080.

| Preceded by Ghazi Khan Dhu'l-Qadr | Governor of the Fars province 1540–1555 | Succeeded by Ali Soltan Tati-oghlu Dhu'l-Qadr |
