= Dutch–Safavid relations =

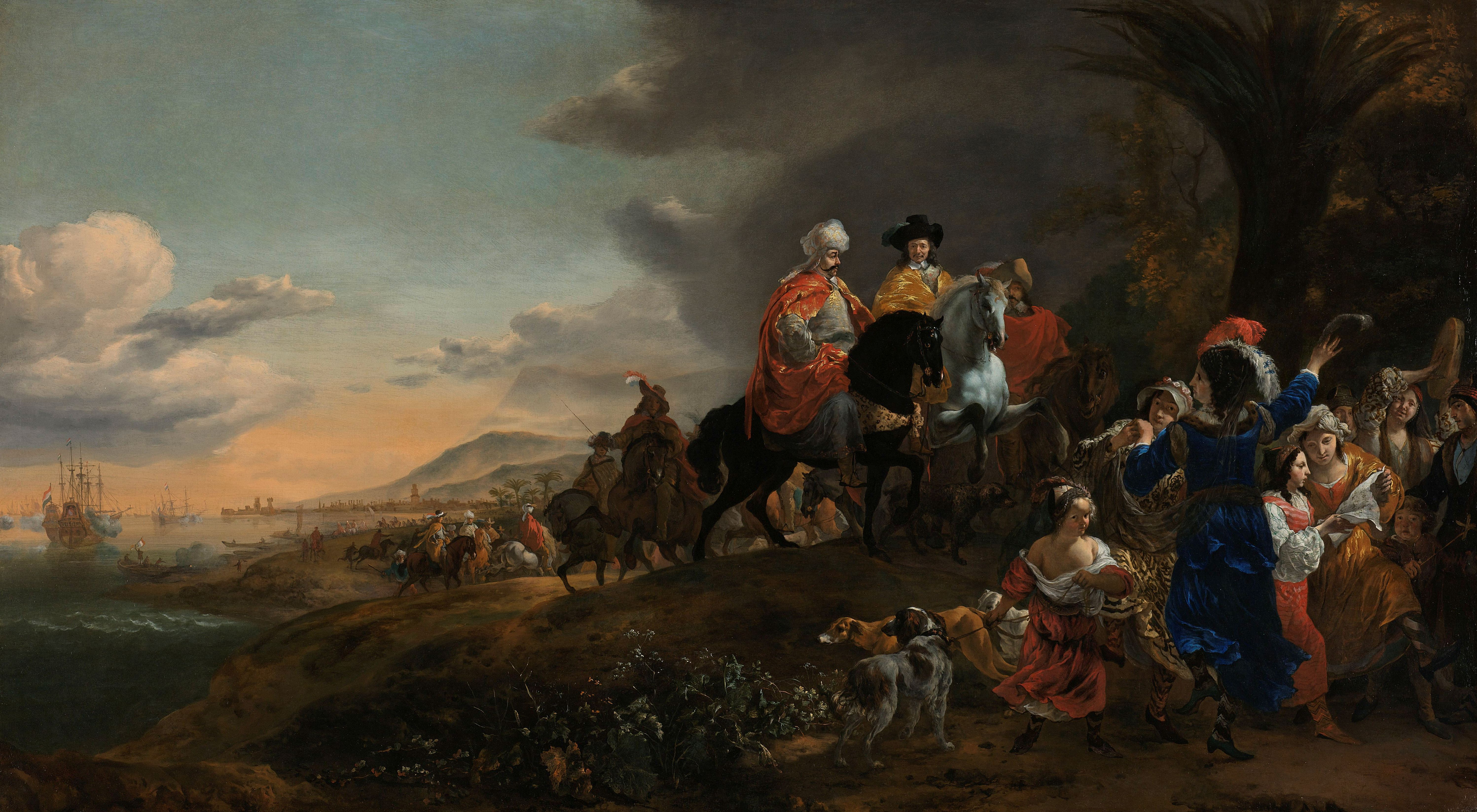
The Dutch ambassador Joan Cunaeus and his secretary Cornelis Speelman on their way to Isfahan to promote silk and horse trading. Made by Jan Baptist Weenix between 1653 and 1659

Dutch–Safavid relations were the historical interactions between the Dutch Republic and Safavid Iran from the 16th to the 18th century.

== Political history ==
The Dutch had limited knowledge of Iran and its language until the 16th century. In 1546, a Persian version of the Torah was printed in Constantinople using the Hebrew alphabet, marking the first time a Persian text had ever appeared in print. Drawing on this publication, Franciscus Raphelengius (1539–1597), then a professor at Leiden University, later compiled a small Persian word list.

The first attempt at comparing Indo-European languages came from Raphelengius, who observed that some Persian and Dutch words sounded like each other. Progress stopped at this stage, however, because the older Iranian and Indian languages that would later explain these connections were not discovered until the 19th century. Raphelengius' list was modified into a short Persian-Latin dictionary by Joseph Justus Scaliger (1540–1609), another professor from Leiden University. It can be regarded as the earliest instance of Persian academic research in Europe, despite not being published.

Between 1623 and 1759, Iran's foreign trade was largely controlled by the Dutch East India Company (abbreviated VOC). Its dominance, however, was continually contested, most notably by the British East India Company. With the exception of 1623–1638, the majority of Dutch records related to their contacts with Iran are VOC records from the 17th and 18th centuries. Jan Huyghen van Linschoten (1563–1611) played a leading role in spreading knowledge of Iran. In 1607, Shah Abbas I (r. 1587–1629) sent Zayn al-Din Beg as his ambassador to the Netherlands. The Dutch became interested in Iranian silk in 1611, when the English adventurer Anthony Shirley arrived to the Netherlands to foster military and commercial ties between Iran and Europe.

In 1622, the VOC finally directed its attention to Iran, the same year that the Portuguese were expelled from their Hormuz stronghold by the British East India Company. The VOC had previously been delayed by intense commercial rivalry with the Portuguese and British in Southeast Asia.

== Views and exchanges ==
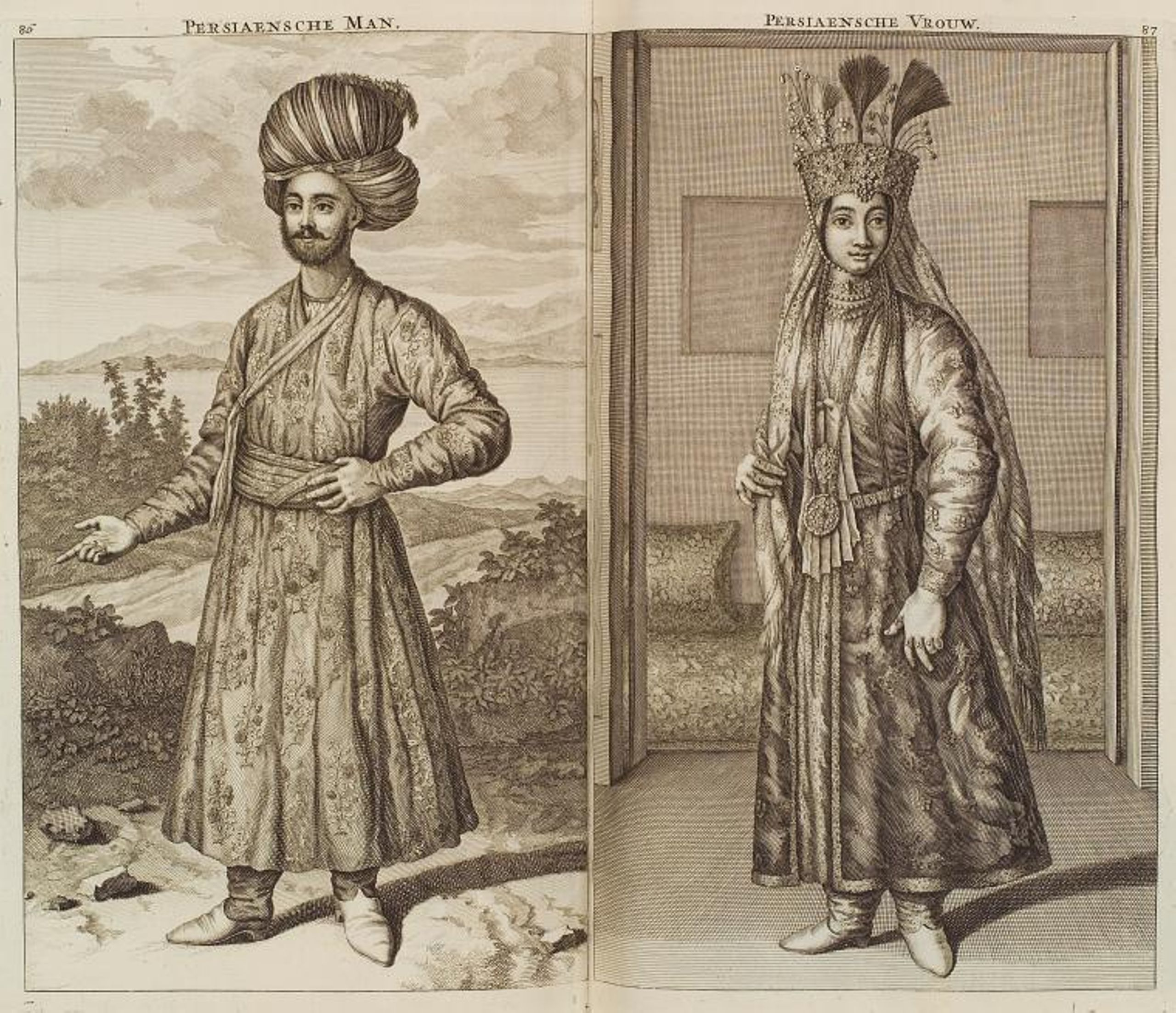
Iranian man and woman, by the Dutch artist Cornelis de Bruyn, dated 1714

Western Europeans were rarely mentioned in Safavid-era texts. There is little mention of Europe (Farangestan) as a competitor, threat, or point of comparison, even long after the Safavid dynasty. European figures appear in Safavid-era texts almost exclusively through brief mentions of Portuguese diplomats visiting the shah. Secondary sources, typically from Europe, provide the majority of the information regarding Safavid views on Europeans.

Iranian sources provide scant information about the Dutch, sometimes referred to as Valandīs or Holandīs. This may be partly because the Iranian upper class paid little attention to merchants and partly because the Afghans destroyed many state records in the mid-18th century. The Netherlands was visited by Iranians, as reported by François Valentyn (1666–1727), who said that he "need not describe the Persians, neither how they are dressed nor their nature, because there are many of them in Amsterdam, where one can see them every day."

The Dutch had many contacts with Iranian government officials and merchants, more than the English and Portuguese. The contacts, however, were formal and mostly polite on the surface. Because the VOC directors were primarily concerned with trade, Dutch merchants rarely wrote about Iran or its people in their letters. The Dutch regarded Iranian officials as arrogant, insincere, greedy, corrupt, and effeminate, noting that they employed extended displays of friendship as a calculated tactic to gain advantage over their adversaries.

== Sources ==
- Floor, Willem (1996). "Dutch-Persian relations". In Yarshater, Ehsan (ed.). Encyclopædia Iranica (Online ed.). Encyclopædia Iranica Foundation. ISBN 978-1568590288.
- Floor, Willem (2021). "Commercial Relations between Safavid Persia and Western Europe". In Melville, Charles (ed.). Safavid Persia in the Age of Empires: The Idea of Iran. Vol. 10. I.B. Tauris. pp. 267–290.
- Matthee, Rudi (2021). "The idea of Iran in the Safavid period: Dynastic pre-eminence and Urban Pride". In Melville, Charles (ed.). Safavid Persia in the Age of Empires: The Idea of Iran. Vol. 10. I.B. Tauris. pp. 81–105.
