= Afonso de Noronha =

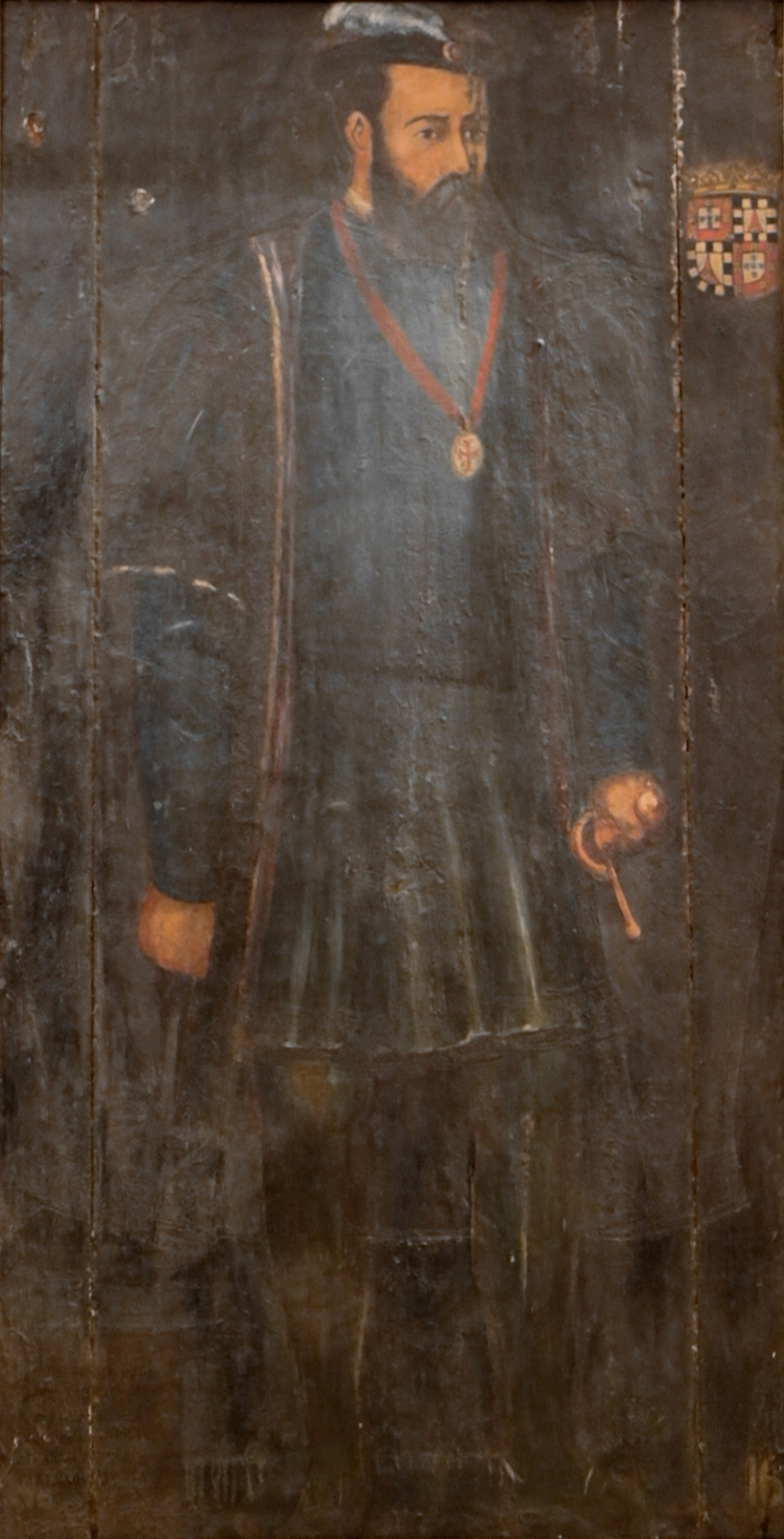

Governor of Portuguese India
- In office 1550–1554
- Preceded by: Jorge Cabral
- Succeeded by: Pedro Mascarenhas

Governor of Ceuta
- In office 1538–1549

Personal details
- Born: c. 1498
- Died: 1573
- Occupation: Military officer, Governor of Portuguese India

Afonso de Noronha (c. 1498–1573) was a Portuguese nobleman, military officer, and governor of Ceuta from 1538 to 1549. He was the fourth son of Fernando de Menezes, 2nd Marquis of Vila Real, and Maria Freire de Andrade. He married Dona Maria de Eça. He succeeded his brother Nuno Álvares Pereira de Noronha, the governor until 1538.

In India, de Noronha served as the 5th Viceroy of India and the Governor of Portuguese India from 1550 to 1554, succeeding governor Jorge Cabral, although some earlier heads of Portuguese India had served only as governors without being appointed Viceroy. In India, he oversaw construction of two fortresses: the Fortaleza dos Reis Magos de Goa and the Fortaleza de Mascate. He pacified Ceylon and defended Hormuz Island when it was attacked by an Ottoman Turkish fleet in 1552. After his term ended, Afonso de Noronha returned to Portugal in January 1555 and was appointed mordomo-mor, or chief steward, to Infanta D. Maria, daughter of D. Manuel I.

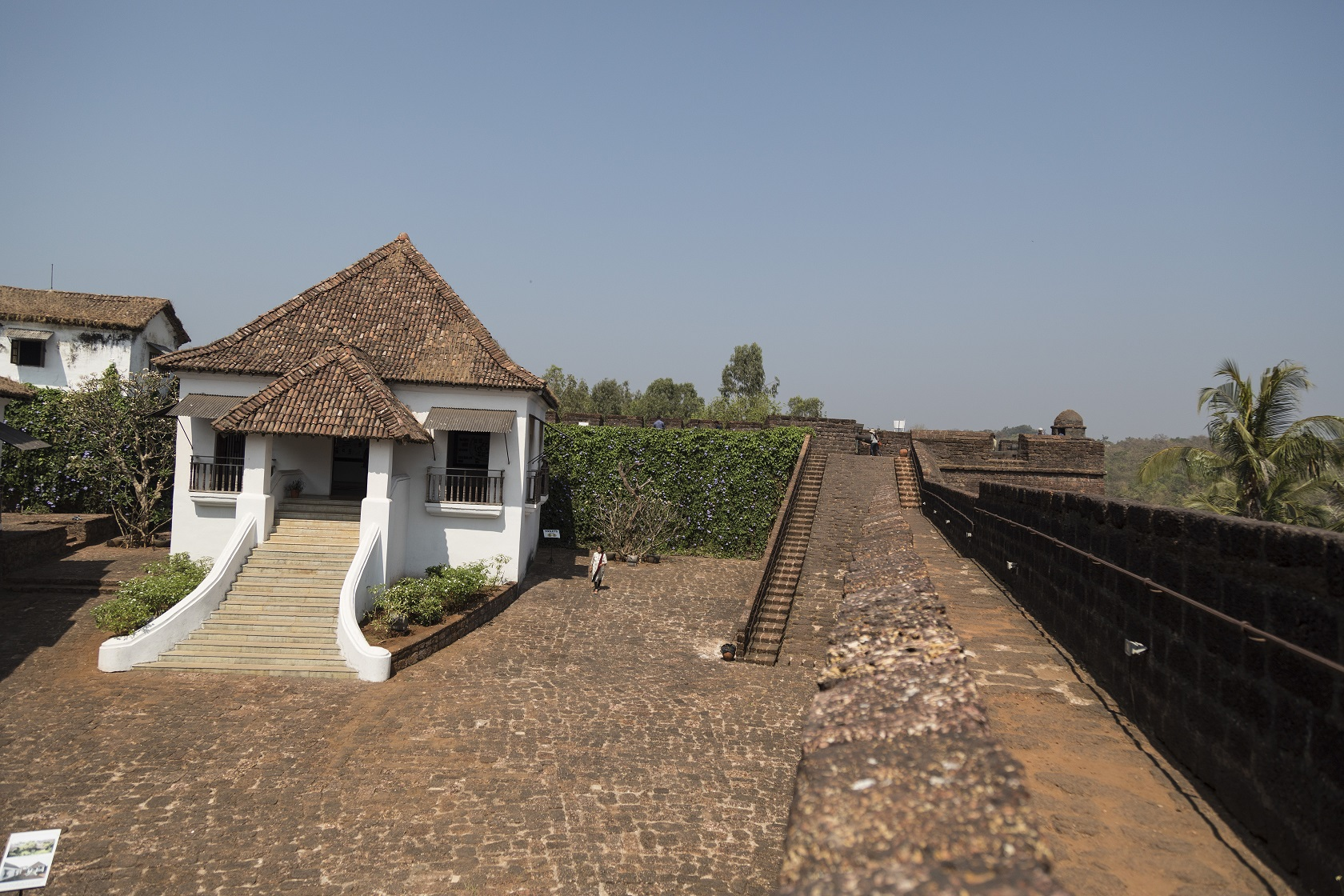
Fortaleza dos Reis Magos de Goa (interior)

== General references ==
- Nuno Vila-Santa (September 2009). "O Vice-Reinado de D. Afonso de Noronha (1550-1554): Perspectivas Políticas da Ásia Portuguesa em meados de Quinhentos".
- Sandra Tavares (14 July 2007). "A Família Cabral". Personalidades de Mangualde. Archived from the original on 2009-04-10.
- "Jorge Cabral". Infopédia. n.d.
- Saalfeld, Friedrich (1810). "Alfonso de Noronha". Geschichte des portugiesischen Kolonialwesens in Ostindien (in German). J.F. Röwer. p.113, sec. 17.
- Nuno Luís de Vila-Santa Braga Campos (2011). D. Afonso de Noronha, vice-rei da Índia: Perspectivas Políticas do Reino e do Império em Meados de Quinhentos (in Portuguese). Lisboa: Centro de História de Além-Mar, CHAM. ISBN 9789898492074.
- "D. Afonso de Noronha". Enciclopédia Virtual da Expansão Portuguesa (in Portuguese). 2009.
- "Afonso De Noronha". Tubarão Esquilo (in Portuguese). n.d.
- Francisco de São Luis (1850). Os Portuguezes em Africa, Asia, America e Occeania: Obra Classica (in Portuguese). Vol. VI. Lisboa: Typ. de Borges.
- "Capitulo IX". Asia: Portuguesa (in Portuguese). Vol. 2. Lisboa: Oliveira. 1674.

Preceded by Jorge Cabral (1549-1550)	Governor of Portuguese India; Afonso de Noronha (1550–1554)	Succeeded by Pedro Mascarenhas (1554–1555)
