= Moqarrariyeh =

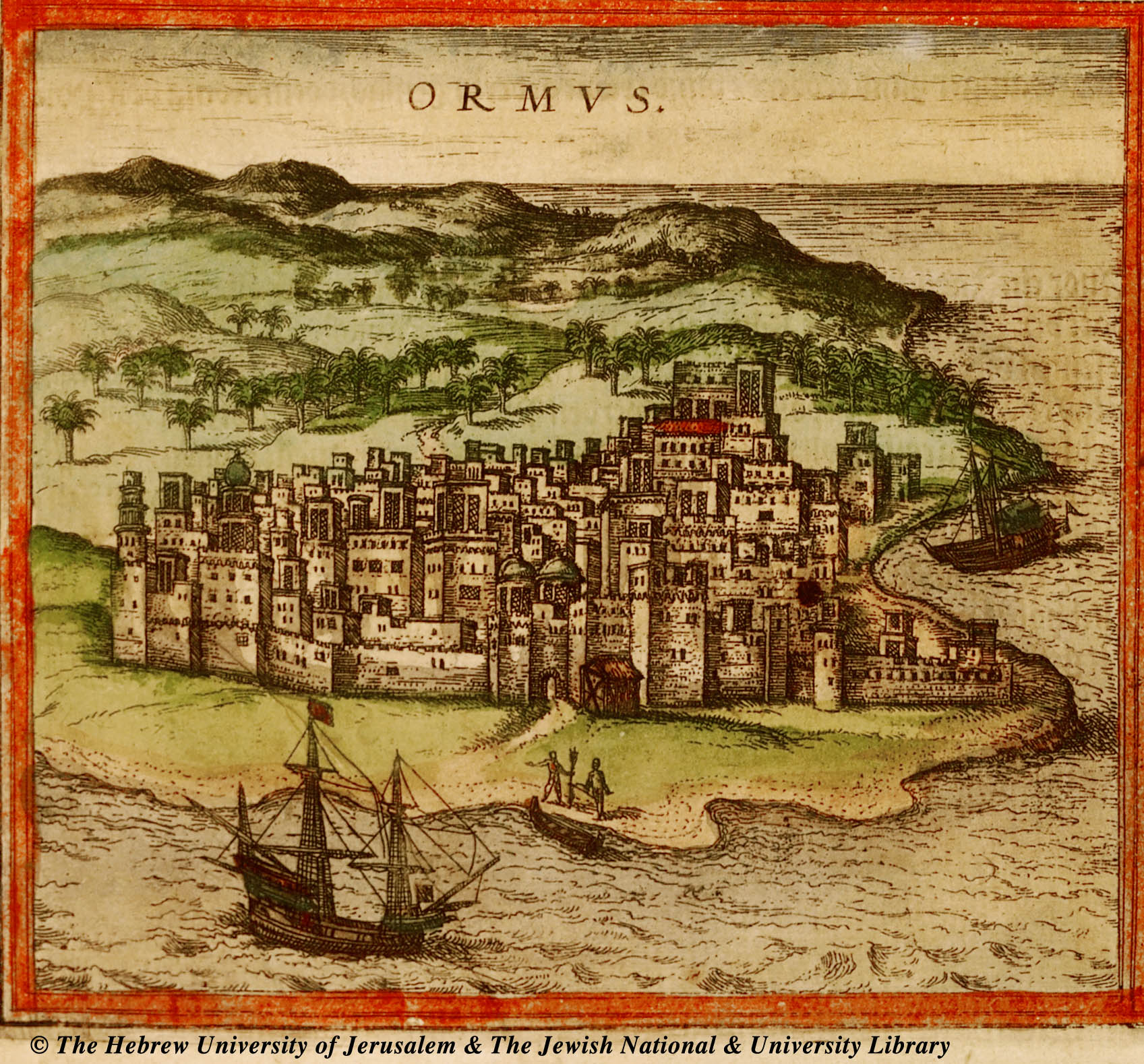
Drawing of Hormuz by Georg Braun, dated 1572

Moqarrariyeh was an annual fixed sum given by the Kingdom of Hormuz to the rulers of the Iranian plateau since at least the 13th century to safeguard the movement of trade caravans to and from the Hormuz Island.

== Overview ==
From 1320 until the 17th and early 18th century, the island was the primary naval entry point to the Persian Gulf. The Persian Gulf experienced significant development and instability in the 16th century as a result of a shift in power dynamics, particularly the rise of the Safavid dynasty. In 1504, Hormuz was asked by the Safavid ruler Shah Ismail I (r. 1501–1524) to pay 2,000 ashrafis as a mogarrariyeh.

According to the Iranologist Willem Floor; "The payment of this fee, which had no relation to the volume or value of actual trade, may be seen as an acknowledgement of the suzerainty of the Safavid shahs over the kingdom of Hormuz. However, during the entire period that the kingdom of Hormuz paid the fee to whoever was in power on the mainland it remained totally free and independent in its commercial and political activities and policies."

The Moqarrariyeh was an ordinary trade transaction intended to secure the passage of trade caravans. The prosperity of the kingdoms of Hormuz and Lar depended on this security and would have been endangered without it. The economic aspect of the moqarrariyeh was also acknowledged by the British traveler Anthony Jenkinson; "the Portingals fetche their fresh water there [the Iranian mainland], for the which they pay tribute to the Shaugh, or King of Persia." Although the Portuguese statesman Afonso de Albuquerque refused to pay moqarrariyeh in 1515 because he saw it as an admission of subordination, the Portuguese also recognized its economic importance. Hormuz had been conquered in the same year by Albuquerque, who placed the island under a Portuguese "protectorate". This caused a dispute with Safavid Iran and lasted until 1622, when the Safavids, assisted by the English, expelled the Portuguese.

In some situations, Hormuzi bureaucrats seemingly treated the word as a reference to tribute. A tribute paid to the Portuguese monarch was labeled as moqarrariyeh by the vizier of Hormuz, Rashed ibn Ahmad. In 1539, after having visited Hormuz and Safavid Iran, the Venetian diplomat Michele Membré wrote that "the King of Hormuz who every year pays 300 tumans to the Sophy and 4,000 ducats to the King of Portugal."

The vizier of Hormuz, Rokn al-Din opposed the new moqarrariyeh rates set by Martim Afonso de Melo in 1545 as he anticipated the modifications would provoke a commotion. The moqarrariyeh payment to Safavid Iran ceased in 1515 and remained unpaid until 1521, when it was resumed by Turan Shah IV to gain Safavid support following his failed uprising. By at least 1568, the moqarrariyeh revenues from Rishahr had been absorbed into the shah's accounts.

In 1543, the Kingdom of Hormuz handed over its customs operations to the Portuguese. Despite this change, an annual moqarrariyeh of 205 lakhs and 3 hazars continued to be paid out. The Portuguese leadership in Goa insisted that the money be collected through the customs officers in Hormuz. They did this because they did not want it to look like the King of Portugal was the one paying the fee.

Prior to the Ottoman annexation of Basra in 1546, the king of Hormuz also paid the moqarrariyeh to its ruler. Following administrative reforms in 1568, the flow of the moqarrariyeh was restructured so that customs officials provided the funds directly to the vizier of Hormuz. From that point on, the vizier, rather than the king, was responsible for making the payments. Failure to secure payment resulted in the obstruction of caravan commerce by mainland rulers. The reform also lowered the annual amount to 112 lakh. From 1574 onwards, the amount was lowered to 102 lakh.

Recipients of moqarrariyeh and the amounts paid in c. 1568 according to a Portuguese document.
Recipient	Azares (hazar; Iranian coin)	Xerafins
Safavid shah	66-76	3,107-1-48
Governor of Lar	52-92	2,474-3-02
Governor of Shiraz	19-96	931–3–33
Miraquebiar, lord of Mazouza [?]	2-08	97–0–06
Amir de Samacadim; Aariamira de Zarao [?]	7-26	338–2–51
Governor of Rayshahr	19-32	899–3–27
Chief of Makran	6-95	326–2–48

== Sources ==
- Floor, Willem (2006). A political and economic history of five port cities, 1500-1730. Mage Publishers. ISBN 978-1933823126.
- Teles e Cunha, Joao (2009). "Portugal i. Relations with Persia in the Early Modern Age (1500-1750)". In Yarshater, Ehsan (ed.). Encyclopædia Iranica (Online ed.). Encyclopædia Iranica Foundation. ISBN 978-0-933273-95-5.
