= Lotf-Ali Khan Daghestani =

High-ranking Safavid military commander and official

Sepahsalar of Safavid Iran
- In office 1718–1720
- Monarch: Soltan Hoseyn
- Preceded by: Hosaynqoli Khan (Vakhtang VI)
- Succeeded by: Esmail Khan

Beglarbeg of Fars
- In office 22 October 1717 – December 1720
- Monarch: Soltan Hoseyn

Personal details
- Born: Daghestan (?)
- Relatives: Fath-Ali Khan Daghestani (uncle & brother-in-law)

Lotf-Ali Khan Daghestani (Persian: لطفعلی خان داغستانی) was a high-ranking Safavid military commander and official of Lezgian origin. He served as commander-in-chief (sepahsalar) from 1718 to 1720, and as the governor (beglarbeg) of Fars from 22 October 1717 to December 1720.

The appointment of Lotf-Ali Khan Daghestani in 1717 as beglarbeg of Fars brought the reach of the jurisdiction of the latter province, for the first time, close to that what it had been during the tenure of Allahverdi Khan, more than a century earlier.

Lotf-Ali Khan was a nephew as well as brother-in-law of the Safavid grand vizier, Fath-Ali Khan Daghestani (1716–1720). At the time of Fath-Ali Khan's downfall, Lotf-Ali Khan was arrested and thrown into jail.

== Sources ==
- Floor, Willem M. (2008). Titles and Emoluments in Safavid Iran: A Third Manual of Safavid Administration, by Mirza Naqi Nasiri. Washington, DC: Mage Publishers. pp. 152–153. ISBN 978-1933823232.
- Matthee, Rudi (2008). "SAFAVID DYNASTY". In Yarshater, Ehsan (ed.). Encyclopædia Iranica. London and New York: Routledge & Kegan Paul.
- Matthee, Rudi (2012). Persia in Crisis: Safavid Decline and the Fall of Isfahan. I.B.Tauris. pp. 214, 230–231, 238, 326. ISBN 978-1845117450.
- Savory, Roger (1993). "DĀḠESTĀNĪ, FATḤ ʿALĪ KHAN". Encyclopaedia Iranica, Vol. VI, Fasc. 6. pp. 576–577.

Preceded by Hosaynqoli Khan (Vakhtang VI)	Commander-in-chief (sepahsalar); 1718–1720	Succeeded by Esmail Khan
