= Jorge Cabral =

Ruler of Portuguese India during 1549–1550

His Lordship Jorge Cabral
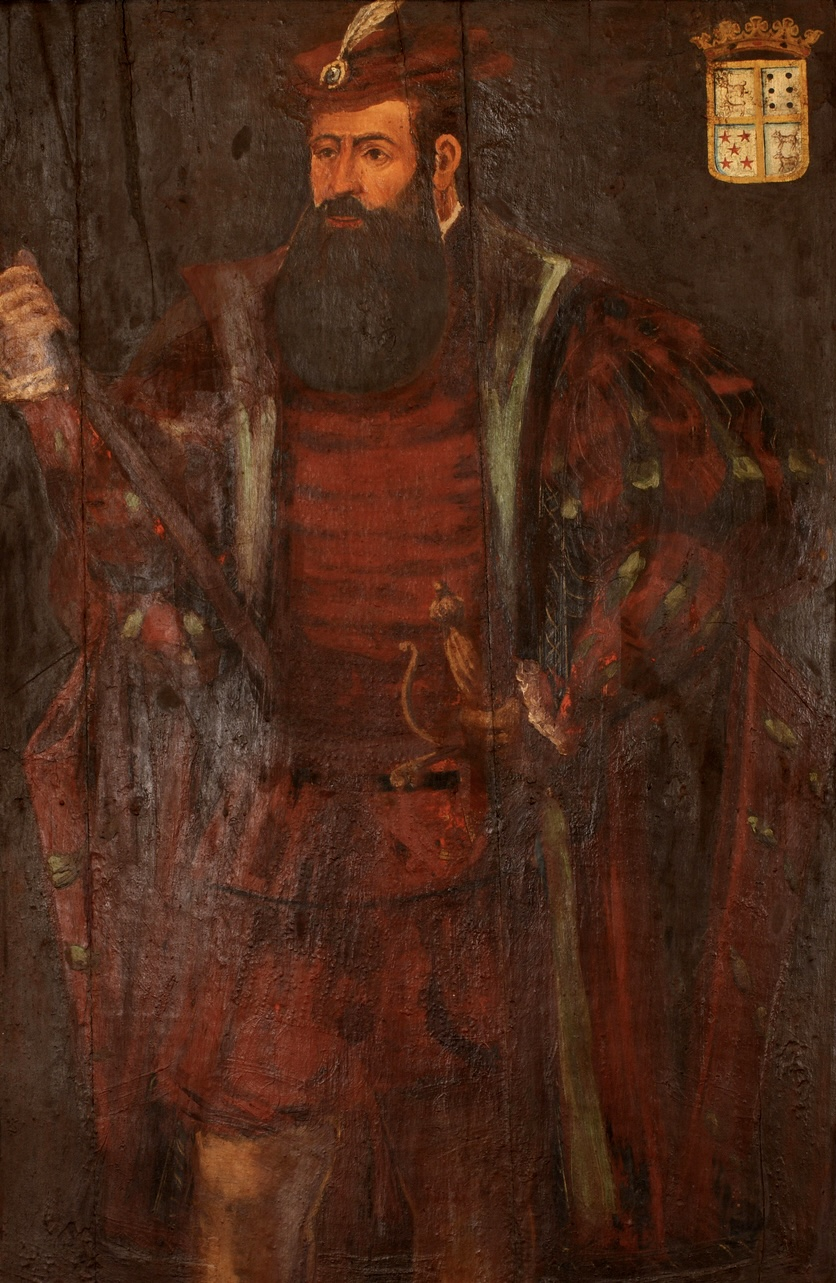

Governor of India
- In office 13 June 1549 – November 1550
- Monarch: John III
- Preceded by: Garcia de Sá
- Succeeded by: Afonso de Noronha

Personal details
- Born: 1500
- Died: Unknown
- Occupation: Soldier (military officer), explorer, Governor of Portuguese India
- Known for: Establishment of Portuguese naval hegemony in the Indian Ocean.

Jorge Cabral (born 1500) was a Portuguese nobleman, soldier (military officer) and explorer who was the 15th ruler of Portuguese India as governor from 13 June 1549 to November 1550.

== Biography ==
Jorge Cabral was a son of João Fernandes Cabral, lord of Azurara, and his mother was Joanna de Castro. He was also the nephew of Portuguese explorer and navigator Pedro Álvares Cabral, who discovered Brazil.

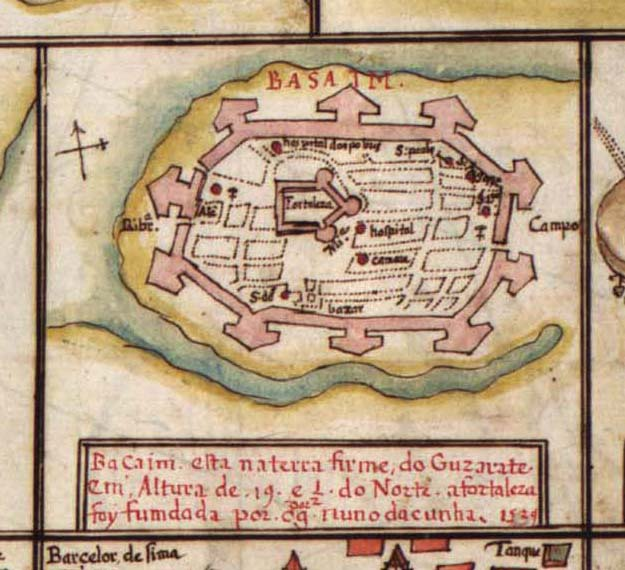
Map of Bassein (c. 1539), drawn by Nuno da Cunha, Governor of Portuguese India (1528-38).

To get along in Portuguese India, the wife of Cabral was Lucretia Fialho, the first wife of one of the previous viceroys of Portuguese India. Cabral arrived in India in 1525 and, like his predecessor, held the posts of Captain of Malacca in 1526–1528 years and after the post of Captain of Bassein. He became famous for being the first viceroy of Portuguese India who brought his wife to Goa from the mother country. Cabral himself came from a not very noble family, so many hidalgos in Portuguese India refused to obey his orders or ignored them. However, his wife was a powerful and assertive woman.

Cabral contended for many years in India before becoming a governor of Portuguese India after the death of Garcia de Sá. De Sá, who was the Governor of Portuguese India in 1548–1549, died on 13 June 1549. After the death of de Sá, the colony council proposed to Cabral the post of Governor of Portuguese India because his name was on the list of applicants for the position in an emergency situation. Cabral had planned to abandon the new appointment, because he believed that the post of Viceroy of India was very troublesome and unstable, and the arrival of the newly titled governor (or even the viceroy) would be expected in the near future, which would inevitably lead to the loss of all privileges and income for Cabral. He preferred to remain in the position of captain of the Bassein due to the regular income. But his wife, for the temporary triumph, demanded her husband accept the proposal of the colony council and become governor of India.

Cabral took office as Governor of India on 13 June 1549 and occupied it for less than a year and a half. The responsibility for preparing a war against the zamorin fell on his shoulders and soon rumours appeared that the Turks were gathering a huge fleet in the Red Sea to attack Portuguese India. Reliable information from this region was not received any more, as the Portuguese lost their positions in Aden in February 1548, and the new governor had to work with unreliable information. Governor Cabral spent the year making preparations, and only in August 1550 did the information come that the Turks had amassed a large fleet; for unknown reasons they abandoned the idea of going to India.

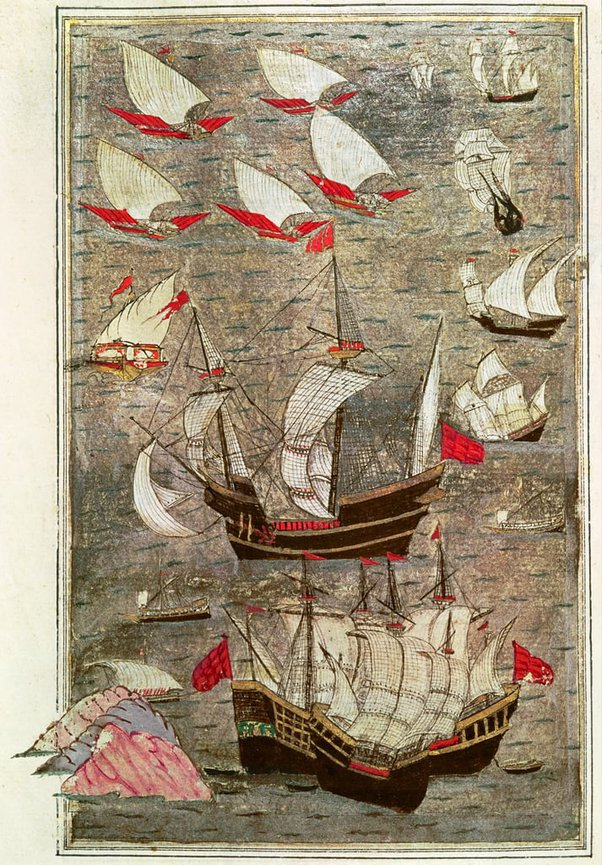
Ottoman fleet in the Indian Ocean in the 16th century.

The Ottoman Empire fleet was not the only problem during the reign of Cabral. At the same time, he was dragged into the conflict on the Malabar Coast, which arose due to the transportation of black pepper. The main flow of this cargo passed through the territory which in the 16th century was called Bardela, but modern historians, even Indian, cannot accurately identify its location on the map of modern India. All agree only on the fact that this area was south of Cochin and probably was an island. Since the majority of pepper on the coast came through Bardela, his raja bore the unofficial title of "king of pepper". The raja of neighboring Cochin was very envious of the circumstances and repeatedly tried to seize the territory of Bardela without success, although both sides suffered significant losses in manpower. In the second half of 1549, the raja of Cochin enlisted the support of the Portuguese and once again attacked Bardela. The "king of pepper" realized that it was bad and turned to the help of the zamorin, who was glad for any occasion to rub his nose to the ally of the Portuguese. The zamorin gathered a large army and moved south along the Malabar coast, bypassing the Portuguese strongholds. Raja Tanura and his army immediately joined the zamorin. At the same time, the rulers of the principalities mainly to the south of Cochin also began to gather their military troops, so that by the beginning of the fighting the zamorin could already have an army of 140,000 men.

The captain of Cochin by the name of Francisco da Silva lacked diplomatic talent and wanted to extinguish the conflict using brute force. He demanded sharply that the zamorin had to return to Calicut, and local rulers must unconditionally obey the raja of Cochin, i.e., to obey the Portuguese. The zamorin was offended, and the rulers of the Malabar Coast refused to obey the raja of Cochin; Then, Francisco da Silva, with a detachment of Portuguese, marched along the Malabar Coast and attacked the allies in the territory of Bardela. During the battle, the Portuguese defeated the allied army and even killed the Raju of Bardela, the "king of pepper", but da Silva also died in battle.

Upon learning of the "king of pepper's" death, the zamorin vowed to avenge the Portuguese, collected a large army and moved closer to Cochin. 18 local rulers joined him there, so that the number of the zamorin's army exceeded 100,000 people. A third of this army was located on unknown islands, perhaps Bardal, and the rest of the forces remained on the continent. At this time Portuguese forces were under command of Manuel de Sousa Sepulveda, who broke enemy allied forces into two parts with the help of his fleet and interrupted the connection between them. Soon the command of the army took over Cabral, who began preparations for the destruction of enemy forces on the island. But Cabral did not have time to attack due to the new viceroy of Portuguese India, Afonso de Noronha (1498–1575), who arrived in Cochin with a fleet in October 1550. All captains and officers involved in the military operation hastened to abandon their positions and rushed to greet the new ruler. The fighting activity ceased, but the tense situation in the South of Malabar remained for quite some time, which had a negative impact on the pepper supply to Portugal.

Cabral had to return to Cochin to hand over all cases to the new Viceroy of India. Afonso de Noronha solemnly entered a post on 6 November 1550. Cabral returned to Portugal at the first opportunity because the new ruler of Portuguese India had not offered him a position in his administration, and the captaincy in the Bassein was already lost.

Nothing is known about the fate of Cabral, and even the date of his death and his burial place are unknown. The Raja of the Cochin era was hostile to the Portuguese: first, they treacherously threw him into the midst of the war with the zamarin; secondly, soon after Cabral's departure, the Portuguese plundered a highly revered temple near Cochin.

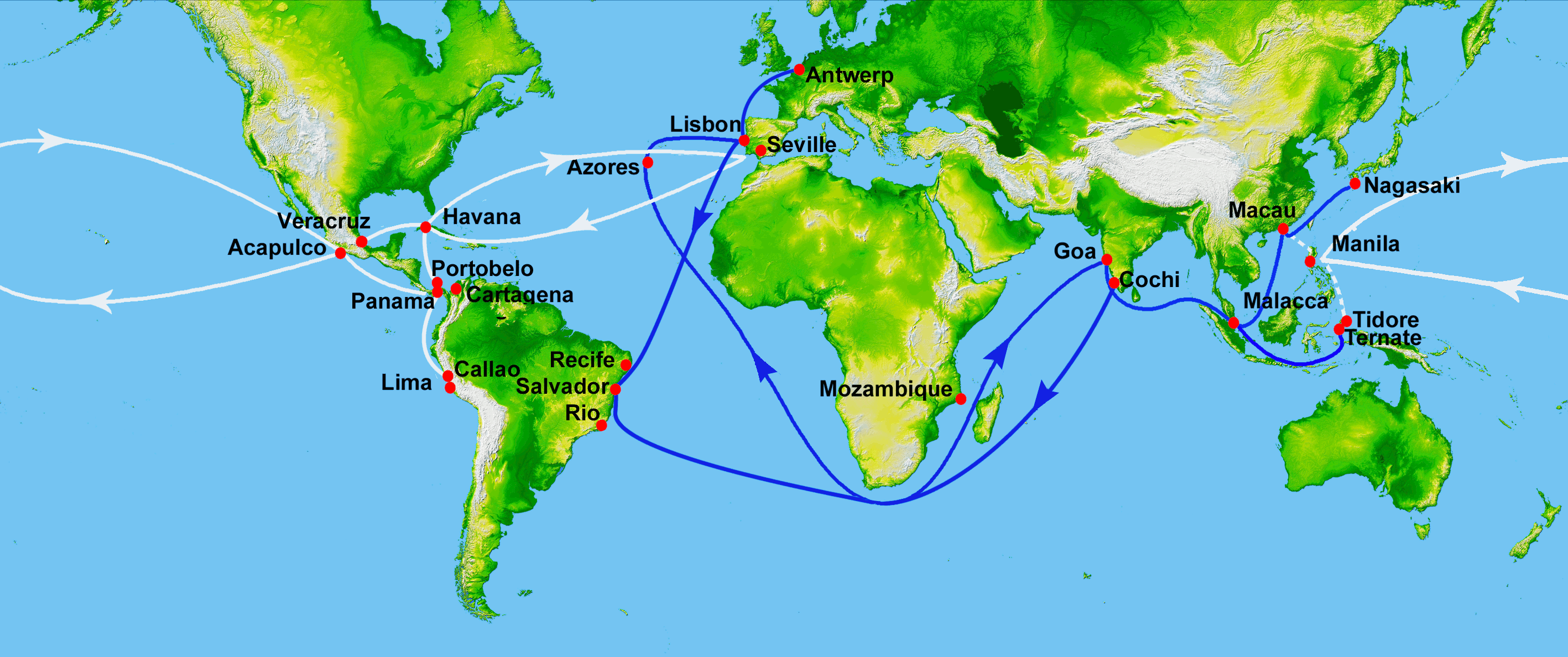
16th-century Portuguese Spanish trade routes.

Preceded by Garcia de Sá (1548–1549)	Governor of Portuguese India; Jorge Cabral (1549-1550)	Succeeded by Afonso de Noronha (1550–1554)
