= Safavid Fars =

Province in southwestern Safavid Iran

Safavid Fars Velāyat-e Fārs
- Province
- Country: Safavid Iran
- Capital: Shiraz

The province of Fars (Persian: ولایت فارس, romanized: Velāyat-e Fārs) was a southwestern province of Safavid Iran. Like today, Shiraz also served as the capital of Fars. The terms "governor of Shiraz" and "governor of Fars" were used interchangeably, as they described the same position.

== History ==
On the coastal region, the jurisdiction of Fars stretched from Bushehr to the Shatt al-Arab, while the rest of the coast was mostly ruled by the Kingdom of Hormuz. Lar was an autonomous principality that minted its own coins, but still acknowledged the authority of the Safavids.

Fars was conquered in 1503 by Shah Ismail I (r. 1501–1524). With the exception of two short periods in 1505 and 1509, Fars was always governed by a member of the Dhu'l-Qadr tribe until 1590. The vizier of the first Dhu'l-Qadr governor was a member of the Jaberi Ansari family from Isfahan, which remained influential in the administration of Fars until the 18th century. In 1602, Lar and Bahrain was incorporated into Fars. After the execution of Emamqoli Khan in 1632, Fars became a khasseh (crown land) under the jurisdiction of a vizier. Compared to the earlier governors, these viziers were far less powerful.

The shah now had direct control over the dependencies of Fars, transitioning them from sub-provinces into independent administrative units reporting to the central government. Because of this, appointments now heavily relied on court connections. Lar subsequently became its own province, separate from Fars. In 1696, Fars experienced a drought and famine. In 1712, Fars was no longer a crown domain and had a governor again. From 1724 to early 1730, Fars was occupied by the Afghan Hotak dynasty.

In March 1734, Mohammad Taqi Khan Shirazi was installed as the governor of Fars by Nader, an Iranian military commander who later ousted the Safavid dynasty and crowned himself shah in 1736.

== Economy ==
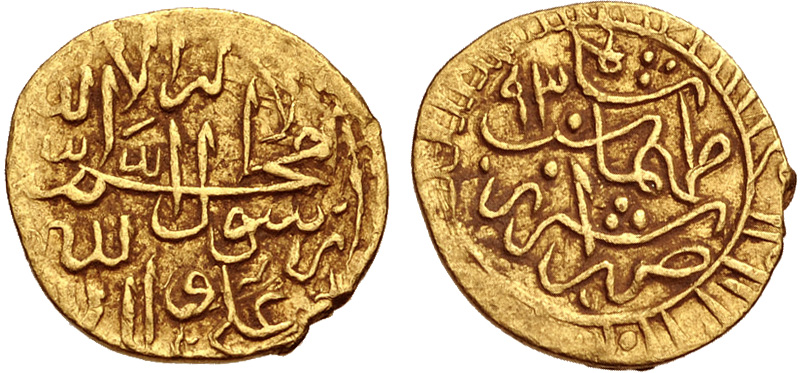
Coin of Shah Tahmasp I, minted in Shiraz, dated 1523/24

Fars was one of Iran's highest-revenue provinces. Travelers generally described it as a prosperous region, using Shiraz as their primary example. However, the 17th century travelers Jean Chardin and Jean-Baptiste Tavernier, along with sources in Persian, provide a contrasting depiction of Fars. According to Chardin, the conversion of Fars to crown land and its reduction in size in 1632 caused it to shift from a prospering province to one in rapid decline.

== Population and religion ==
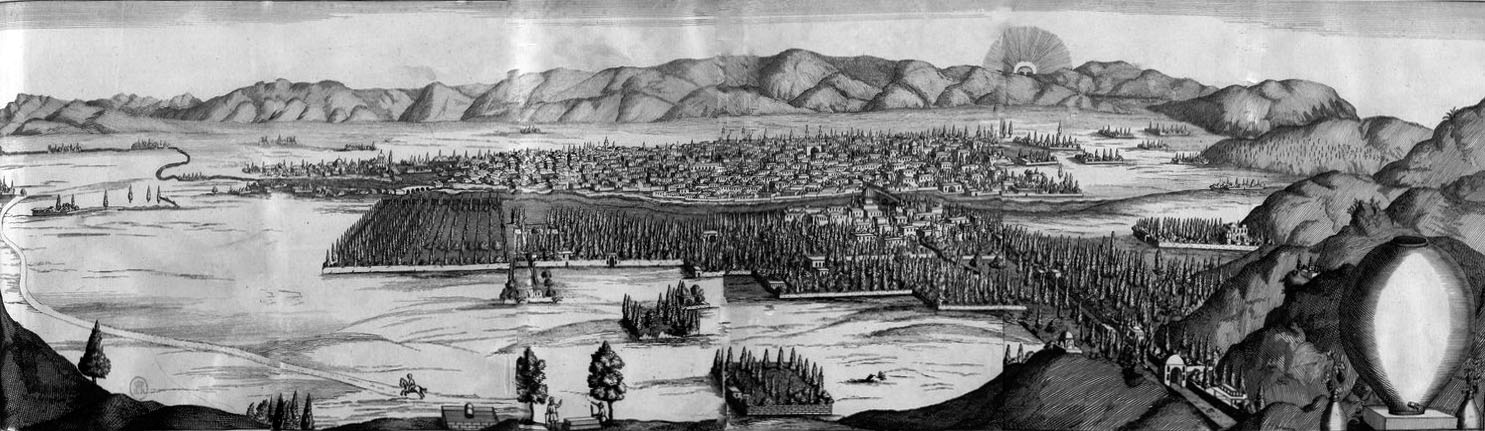
An illustration of Shiraz by French traveler Jean Chardin in 1670s

Shiraz was seemingly inhabited by 75,000 people under Ismail I, a figure that appears to have stayed nearly the same until its decline in the late 17th century.

Under the Safavids, Fars underwent a mass conversion to Shia Islam but Sunni Islam persisted in Lar and some coastal settlements. The rate at which Shia Islam was adopted in the urban and rural areas of Fars is uncertain. During the early Safavid era in Fars, as in other parts of Iran, Sunnis faced persecution, most notably in a massacre at Kazerun.

The Jewish community in Shiraz was one of the oldest in Iran and made up a sizable portion of the city's non-Muslim population.

== List of governors ==
This is a list of the known figures who governed Fars.

Date	Governor
1503–1505	Elyas Beg aka Kachal Beg Dhu'l-Qadr
1506	Mansur Beg Afshar
1506–1520	Ommat Beg Sarusheykhlu Dhu'l-Qadr
?–1510	Qadi Mohammad Kashi
1520–1524	Ali Beg Soltan Dhu'l-Qadr Chichkelu
1525	Morad Soltan Dhu'l-Qadr
1525–1533	Hamzeh Beg Jameselu Dhu'l-Qadr
1533–1540	Ghazi Khan Dhu'l-Qadr
1540–1555	Ebrahim Khan Dhu'l-Qadr
1555–1558	Ali Soltan Tati-oghlu Dhu'l-Qadr
1558–1566	Shahvali Soltan Tati-oghlu Dhu'l-Qadr
1566–?	Mohammad Khan Beg Dhu'l-Qadr
1571	Shahqoli Khalifeh Mohrdar Dhu'l-Qadr
1571–1576	Vali Soltan Khan Qalkhanji-oghlu Dhu'l-Qadr
1577–?	Aliqoli Khan Dhu'l-Qadr
1580	Khalil Khan Dhu'l-Qadr
1581–1586	Ommat Beg Dhu'l-Qadr
1586	Ali Khan Shadi Begluy Dhu'l-Qadr
1586–1588	Mehdiqoli Soltan Sheikh Dhu'l-Qadr
1587	Shahqoli Khalifeh Dhu'l-Qadr
1588–1590	Ya'qub Beg Dhu'l-Qadr ibn Ebrahim Khan
October 1590	Bonyad Beg Dhu'l-Qadr
1592–1593	Hoseyn Khan Mosaheb Qajar
1594	Unnamed Dhu'l-Qadr member
1595	Allahqoli Beg
1595–1596	Farhad Khan Qaramanlu
1596–1613	Allahverdi Khan
1613–1632	Emamqoli Khan
1632–?	Mirza Mo'en
1642–?	Mir Mohammad Ahmad
1644–?	Badadeh Arestu Beg
?–1651–1656	Mirza Hadi ibn Mirza Mo'en
1656–?	Babunah Beg
1696	Shahverdi Khan Seyl-Sopor
1698	Mohammad Ali Beg
?–1712	Mohammad Baqer Beg
April 1714	Kalb Ali Khan
April 1714–?	Mirza Mohammad Hoseyn
January 1717	Safiqoli Beg
January 1717	Mortezaqoli Khan
22 October 1717 – December 1720	Lotf-Ali Khan Daghestani
1722	Mohammad Ali Jaberi Ansari
1723	Nurollah Khan Farahani
1724–1730	Afghan occupation
1734–1736	Mohammad Taqi Khan Shirazi

== Sources ==
- Axworthy, Michael (2006). The Sword of Persia: Nader Shah, from Tribal Warrior to Conquering Tyrant. I.B. Tauris. ISBN 978-1850437062.
- Floor, Willem (2006). A political and economic history of five port cities, 1500-1730. Mage Publishers. ISBN 978-1933823126.
- Floor, Willem (2008). Titles and Emoluments in Safavid Iran: A Third Manual of Safavid Administration, by Mirza Naqi Nasiri. Mage Publishers. ISBN 978-1933823232.
- Yeroushalmi, David (2009). The Jews of Iran in the Nineteenth Century. Brill Publishers. ISBN 978-9004152885.
- Lambton, Ann K. S. (1999). "Fārs iii. History in the Islamic Period". In Yarshater, Ehsan (ed.). Encyclopædia Iranica (Online ed.). Encyclopædia Iranica Foundation. ISBN 978-0933273351.
- Matthee, Rudi (2011). Persia in Crisis: Safavid Decline and the Fall of Isfahan. I.B.Tauris. ISBN 978-0857731814.
- Newman, Andrew J. (2008). Safavid Iran: Rebirth of a Persian Empire. I.B.Tauris. ISBN 978-0857716613.
- Tucker, Ernest (2006). "Nāder Shāh". In Yarshater, Ehsan (ed.). Encyclopædia Iranica (Online ed.). Encyclopædia Iranica Foundation. ISBN 978-1934283295.
