= Safavid conquest of Bahrain =

1602 capture of Bahrain from the Portuguese

Conquest of Bahrain (1602)
- Part of Safavid–Portuguese conflicts
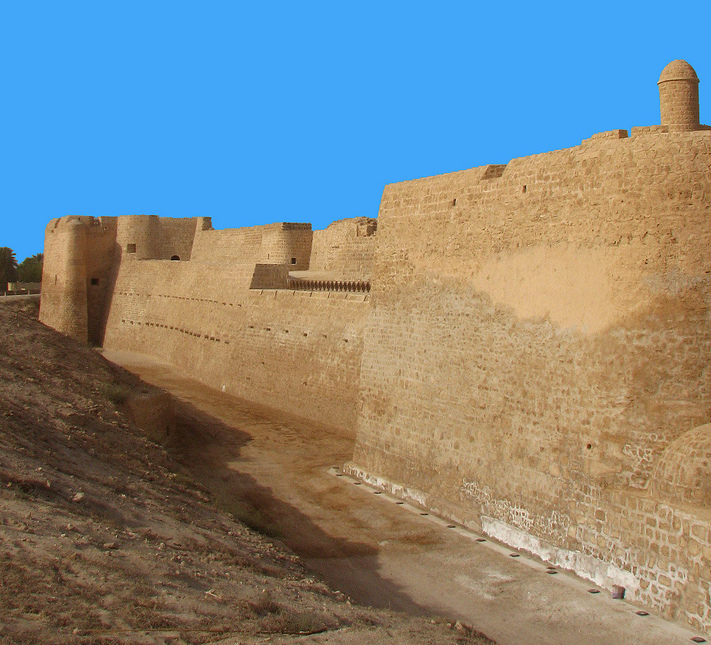
- Portuguese fort in Bahrain
| Date | 1602 |
| Location | Bahrain |
| Result | Safavid victory |

Belligerents
| Bahrain rebels Safavid Iran | Portugal |

Commanders and leaders
| Rukn al-Din Mas'ud (executed); Allahverdi Khan; Mu'in al-Din Fali † | Francisco de Sotomayor |

The Safavid conquest of Bahrain was a military campaign launched in 1602 to capture the island of Bahrain from the Portuguese. The Safavids expelled the Portuguese, ending their occupation of the island.

In 1521, the Portuguese invaded and captured the island of Bahrain. In 1601, the Persian general, Allahverdi Khan, conquered Lar, and put it under quasi-autonomous governorship. This was after its governor behaved treacherously towards Allahverdi, forcing him to capture Lar. The governor died during the siege. The capture of Lar allowed the Safavid Persians to control the coasts of the Persian Gulf, which brought them direct hostilities with the Portuguese in the Gulf.

In 1602, the governor of Bahrain, Rukn al-Din Mas'ud, who was the brother of the Hormuzi vizier, declared independence from Hormuz. Fearing a retaliation from the Portuguese fort in Bahrain, Rukn al-Din asked his relative, Mu'in al-Din Fali, for help. Fali asked for help from Allahverdi. Allahverdi saw this as a great opportunity to seize Bahrain since the Safavids saw it as belonging to Fars province. He then dispatched a force of musketeers to help Rukn al-Din. The Persian forces successfully expelled the Portuguese from their fort.

Rukn al-Din welcomed the Persians led by Allahverdi Khan; however, Allahverdi ordered Rukn al-Din to be executed, thus consolidating Safavid rule over Bahrain. The Safavids expected a Portuguese counterattack. The news of the fall reached Hormuz and a joint Portuguese-Hormuz materialized. Several engagements followed on land and sea during which Mu'in al-Din Fali was wounded and later died. The Safavids held out, emerged victorious, and the Portuguese forces retreated.

== Sources ==
- Willem M Floor (2006), A political and economic history of five port cities, 1500-1730.
- Nasrallah al-Falsafi (1989), Iran and its foreign relations in the Safavid era.
- Falih Handhal (1997), Arab and Portuguese in History from 711 to 1720.
