= Rishahr =

Former port city in Bushehr, Iranian national heritage site

- شهر باستانی ریشهر (Persian)
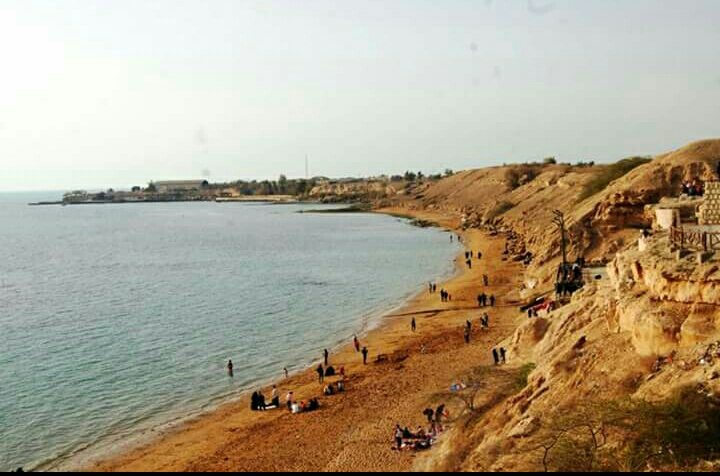
- Rishahr
- Interactive map of Rishahr
- 28°53′46″N 50°49′55″E
- Location: Bushehr

Iran National Heritage List
- Official name: Rishahr
- Type: Ruins
- Designated: 1931
- Reference no.: 12
- Conservation organization: Cultural Heritage, Handicrafts and Tourism Organization of Iran

Rishahr (Persian: ریشهر) or Rev Ardashir (ریو اردشیر) was a city on the Persian Gulf in medieval Iran and is currently an archaeological site near Bushehr. It may be identical to the Antiochia-in-Persis of the Seleucid period, but was refounded by Ardashir I (r. 224–242), the first ruler of the Sasanian Empire. In the Church of the East, it was seat of the metropolitan bishop of the province of Fars from at least 424. The name "Rew-Ardashir" means "Rich is Ardashir".

The city is mentioned by many historians, such as Farhang-i Anandraj, Hamdollah Mostowfi's Nuzhat al-Qulub, Majmal al-tawarikh, and Ibn Balkhi's Farsnameh. In particular, some historians such as Yaqut al-Hamawi's Mu'jam Al-Buldan write of the city being centered on a pre-Islamic academic center of higher learning where scholars converged to study medicine as well as Indian and Greek sciences.

By 1531, the smuggling of spices had made Rishahr wealthy. The Safavid governor of Rishahr, Shah Ali Soltan, expanded his fleet by constructing new ships and seizing several Bahraini vessels. Shah Ali Soltan had rebelled in April 1534 and began targeting the shipping routes. According to Portuguese records, Shah Ali Soltan was a vassal of the Kingdom of Hormuz, a Portuguese protectorate. Shah Ali Soltan soon reached an agreement with the Portuguese that he would no longer have to pay tribute in return for complying with the king of Hormuz.

At the start of 1539, a rebellion was started in Rishahr by Hasan Soltan Rishahri and his brother Shah Ali. The Safavid force under Ghazi Khan Dhu'l-Qadr was unable to capture Rishahr due to the fortifications of the city, as well as their own lack of ships and attacks by local Arab groups encouraged by Hasan Soltan. In mid-1539, the Portuguese captain of Hormuz was asked by Ghazi Khan, on behalf of Shah Tahmasp I (r. 1524–1576), to provide naval assistance in order to break the deadlock against Rishahr.

The Portuguese helped by establishing a blockade of Rishahr in October–November 1539. The blockade lasted three months, during which only the soldiers in Rishahr received the available food, reportedly leading to the deaths of 5,000 civilians. In February 1540, Hasan Soltan capitulated, and was subsequently executed by the Safavids, who installed a new governor in Rishahr. Rishahr lost its status as a self-governing polity and its regional political influence, but it remained relevant to the local economy as a site for trade and smuggling. By at least 1568, the moqarrariyeh revenues from Rishahr had been absorbed into the shah's accounts.

Dehkhoda dictionary mentions that the city was eventually deserted and its inhabitants moved to Bushehr.

== Bibliography ==
- Floor, Willem (2006). A political and economic history of five port cities, 1500-1730. Mage Publishers. ISBN 978-1933823126.
- Potts, Daniel (2018). "Rev-Ardashir (Rishahr)". In Nicholson, Oliver (ed.). The Oxford Dictionary of Late Antiquity, Volume 2: J–Z. Oxford: Oxford University Press. p. 1284. ISBN 978-0-19-881625-6.
- Russell, James R. (2004). Armenian and Iranian studies. Harvard Armenian Texts and Studies. Vol. 9. Harvard University Press. ISBN 978-0935411195.
- Teles e Cunha, Joao (2009). "Portugal i. Relations with Persia in the Early Modern Age (1500-1750)". In Yarshater, Ehsan (ed.). Encyclopædia Iranica (Online ed.). Encyclopædia Iranica Foundation. ISBN 978-0-933273-95-5.
