= List of portraits in the Portrait Gallery of the Viceroys and Governors of Portuguese India =

This is a list of portraits in the Portrait Gallery of the Viceroys and Governors of Portuguese India, a historic collection of 120 oil paintings depicting the viceroys and governors of Portuguese India from 1505 to 1961.

The portraits below are arranged in chronological order according to each tenure. Governors without a known official portrait are omitted from this list. Images are not available for all portraits.

== List ==
Portrait	Subject	Tenure	Artist	Date/Commission	Current location	Inventory no.	Notes
	D. Francisco de Almeida	1505–1509	Unknown	Commissioned in 1547; Dated c. 1547	MNAA	2145 pint	Restored in Portugal at the IEROA, 1953–1955
	Afonso de Albuquerque	1509–1515	Unknown	Commissioned in 1547	AMVG, G6	97	The portrait is beneath a repaint representing Nuno Álvares Botelho
	Lopo Soares de Albergaria	1515–1518	Unknown	Commissioned in 1547; Dated c. 1584	MNAA	2144 pint	The portrait is beneath a repaint representing Afonso de Albuquerque
	Diogo Lopes de Sequeira	1518–1522	Unknown	Commissioned in 1547; Dated c. 1547	AMVG, G6	86	Restored in Portugal at the IEROA, 1953–1955
	Duarte de Meneses	1522–1524	Unknown	Commissioned in 1547	AMVG, G6	51	
	D. Vasco da Gama	1524	Unknown	Commissioned in 1547; Dated c. 1581	AMVG, G6	41	Restored in Portugal at the IEROA, 1953–1955
	D. Henrique de Meneses	1524–1526	Unknown	Commissioned in 1547	AMVG, G6	86	
	Lopo Vaz de Sampaio	1526–1529	Unknown	Commissioned in 1547	AMVG, R II	49	
	Nuno da Cunha	1529–1538	Unknown	Commissioned in 1547	AMVG, G6	48	
	D. Garcia de Noronha	1538–1540	Unknown	Commissioned in 1547	AMVG, G6	46	
	D. Estêvão da Gama	1540–1542	Unknown	Commissioned in 1547	AMVG, G6	45	The portrait features a coat of arms that doesn't seem to be his
	Martim Afonso de Sousa	1542–1545	Unknown	Commissioned in 1547	AMVG, R II	65	
	D. João de Castro	1545–1548	Unknown	Commissioned in 1547; Dated c. 1547	AMVG, G6	89	Restored in Portugal at the IEROA, 1953–1955
	Garcia de Sá	1548–1549	Attributed to Constantino	Dated before 1560	AMVG, R II	64	
	Jorge Cabral	1549–1550	Attributed to Constantino	Dated c. 1560	AMVG, G6	52	
	D. Afonso de Noronha	1550–1554	Attributed to Constantino	Dated before 1560	AMVG, R I	121	
	D. Pedro Mascarenhas	1554–1555	Attributed to Constantino	Dated c. 1555	AMVG, G6	78	The portrait features the Almeida coat of arms
	Francisco Barreto	1555–1558	Attributed to Constantino	Dated before 1560	AMVG, R II	42	
	D. Constantino of Braganza	1558–1561	Attributed to Constantino	Dated before 1560	AMVG, R II	43	
	D. Francisco Coutinho	1561–1564	Unknown	Commissioned in 1581	AMVG, R II	96	
	João de Mendonça Furtado	1564	Unknown	Commissioned in 1581	AMVG, R II	63	
	D. Antão de Noronha	1564–1568	Unknown	Commissioned in 1581	AMVG, R II	60	
	D. Luís de Ataíde	1568–1571	Unknown	Commissioned in 1581	AMVG, R II	118	First-term portrait
	D. António de Noronha	1571–1573	Unknown	Commissioned in 1581	AMVG, R II	54	
	António Moniz Barreto	1573–1577	Unknown	Commissioned in 1581	AMVG, G6	55	
	D. Diogo de Meneses	1577–1578	Unknown	Commissioned in 1581; Dated c. 1581	AMVG, G6	56	
	D. Luís de Ataíde	1578–1581	Unknown	Commissioned in 1581	AMVG, R I	57	Second-term portrait
	Fernão Teles de Menezes	1581	Unknown	Commissioned in 1581; Dated c. 1581	AMVG, R II	58	
	D. Francisco de Mascarenhas	1581–1584	Unknown	Dated c. 1584 c. 1590 by another source	MNAA, R	2146 pint	Restored in Portugal at the IEROA, 1953–1955
	D. Francisco de Mascarenhas	1581–1584	Unknown	Dated c. 18th century	AMVG, G6	59	The portrait is a later version created during a broader intervention campaign
	D. Duarte de Meneses	1584–1588	Unknown	Dated c. 1588	AMVG, G6	53	
	Manuel de Sousa Coutinho	1588–1591	Unknown	Dated 16th century	AMVG, G6	69	
	Matias de Albuquerque	1591–1597	Unknown	Dated c. 1597	AMVG, R II	61	
	D. Francisco da Gama	1597–1600	Unknown	Dated c. 1600	AMVG, R II	67	First-term portrait
	Aires de Saldanha	1600–1605	Attributed to Aleixo Godinho	Dated c. 1605	AMVG, G6	66	
	D. Martim Afonso de Castro	1605–1607	Attributed to Aleixo Godinho	Dated c. 1604–1606	AMVG, G6	68	
	Aleixo de Menezes	1608–1609	Aleixo Godinho	Commissioned in March 1609; Dated early 17th century	AMVG, G6	62	
	André Furtado de Mendonça	1609	Attributed to Aleixo Godinho	Dated c. 1609	AMVG, G6	70	
	Rui Lourenço de Távora	1609–1612	Attributed to Aleixo Godinho	Dated 17th century	AMVG, R II	71	
	D. Jerónimo de Azevedo	1612–1617	Attributed to Aleixo Godinho	Dated 17th century	AMVG, G6	72	
	D. João Coutinho	1617–1619	Attributed to Aleixo Godinho	Dated 17th century	AMVG, R II	73	The portrait features the Lencastre coat of arms
	Fernão de Albuquerque	1619–1622	Attributed to Aleixo Godinho	Dated 17th century	AMVG, G6	74	
	D. Francisco da Gama	1622–1628	Unknown	Dated 17th century	AMVG, G6	75	Second-term portrait
	D. Fr. Luís de Brito e Meneses	1628–1629	Unknown	Dated 17th century	AMVG, G6	76	
	Nuno Álvares Botelho	1629	Unknown	Dated c. 18th century	AMVG, G6	97	The portrait is a repaint over one representing Afonso de Albuquerque
	D. Lourenço da Cunha	1629	Unknown	Dated c. 18th century	AMVG, G6	94	The portrait was commissioned later
	D. Miguel de Noronha	1629–1635	Unknown	Dated c. 1635	AMVG, G6	154	Restored in Portugal at the IEROA, 1953–1956
	Pedro da Silva	1635–1639	Unknown	Dated 17th century	AMVG, R II	132	
	António Teles de Meneses	1639–1640	Unknown	Dated 17th century	AMVG, G6	124	
	D. João da Silva Teles de Menezes	1640–1645	Unknown	Dated c. 1641	AMVG, G6	136	
	D. Filipe Mascarenhas	1645–1651	Unknown	Dated 17th century	AMVG, G6	93	
	Fr. Francisco dos Mártires	1651–1652	Unknown	Dated 17th century	AMVG, R II	152	
	Francisco de Melo e Castro	1651–1652; 1656–1661	Unknown	Dated 17th century	AMVG, G6	152	
	António de Sousa Coutinho	1651–1652; 1656–1661	Unknown	Dated 17th century	AMVG, R II	126	
	D. Vasco Mascarenhas	1652–1653	Unknown	Dated 17th century	AMVG, R II	100	
	D. Rodrigo Lobo da Silveira	1655–1656	Unknown	Dated c. 1656	AMVG, R II	117	
	Manuel Mascarenhas Homem	1656–1661	Unknown	Dated c. 1661	AMVG, G6	117	
	Luís de Mendonça Furtado e Albuquerque	1661–1662; 1671–1677	Unknown	Dated 17th century	AMVG, R II	91	
	D. Pedro de Lencastre	1661–1662	Unknown	Dated c. 1662	AMVG, G6	115	
	António de Melo e Castro	1662–1666	Unknown	Dated 17th century	AMVG, G6	116	First-term portrait
	João Nunes da Cunha	1666–1668	Unknown	Dated c. 1668	AMVG, R II	101	
	António de Melo e Castro	1668–1671	Unknown	Dated 19th century	AMVG, G6	129	Second-term portrait
	Manuel Corte-Real de Sampaio	1668–1671	Unknown	Dated 17th century	AMVG, R II	125	
	Luís de Miranda Henriques	1668–1671	Unknown	Dated 18th century	AMVG, G7	99	
	D. Pedro de Almeida	1677–1678	Unknown	Dated 17th century	AMVG, G7	150	
	D. Fr. António Brandão	1678–1681	Unknown	Dated 18th century	AMVG, G7	79	
	António Pais de Sande	1678–1681	Unknown	Dated 17th century	AMVG, R II	130	
	Francisco de Távora	1681–1686	Unknown	Dated 17th century	AMVG, G7	95	
	D. Rodrigo da Costa	1686–1690	Unknown	Dated 17th century	AMVG, G7	90	First-term portrait
	D. Miguel de Almeida	1690–1691	Unknown	Dated 17th century	AMVG, G7	122	
	D. Fernando Martins Mascarenhas Lencastre	1691–1693	Unknown	Dated 17th century	AMVG, R II	131	
	Luís Gonçalves Cota	1691	Unknown	Dated 18th century	AMVG, R II	142	
	D. Fr. Agostinho da Anunciação	1691–1693; 1701–1702	Unknown	Dated 18th century	AMVG, G7	141	
	D. Pedro António de Meneses Noronha de Albuquerque	1693–1698	Unknown	Dated 17th century	AMVG, G7	155	
	António Luís Gonçalves da Câmara Coutinho	1698–1701	Unknown	Dated 18th century	AMVG, G7	148	
	D. Vasco Luís Coutinho da Costa	1701–1702	Unknown	Dated 18th century	AMVG, G7	153	
	Caetano de Melo e Castro	1702–1707	Unknown	Dated 18th century	AMVG, G7	143	
	D. Rodrigo da Costa	1707–1712	Unknown	Dated 18th century	AMVG, G7	146	Second-term portrait
	Vasco Fernandes César de Meneses	1712–1717	Unknown	Dated 18th century	AMVG, G7	82	
	D. Sebastião de Andrade Pessanha	1717	Unknown	Dated 18th century	AMVG, R II	80	
	D. Luís Carlos Inácio Xavier de Meneses	1717–1720	Unknown	Dated 18th century	AMVG, G7	98	First-term portrait
	Francisco José de Sampaio e Castro	1720–1723	Unknown	Dated 18th century	AMVG, G7	113	
	D. Cristóvão de Melo	1723–1725; 1732	Unknown	Dated 18th century	AMVG, R II	92	
	D. Inácio de Santa Teresa	1723–1725; 1732	Unknown	Dated 18th century	AMVG, R II	127	
	João de Saldanha da Gama	1725–1732	Unknown	Dated c. 1733	AMVG, G7	123	
	D. Pedro Mascarenhas	1732–1741	Unknown	Dated 18th century	AMVG, R II	133	
	D. Luís Carlos Inácio Xavier de Meneses	1741–1742	Unknown	Dated 18th century	AMVG, R II	149	Second-term portrait
	D. Lourenço de Noronha	1742–1744	Unknown	Dated 18th century	AMVG, G7	151	
	D. Luís Caetano de Almeida	1742–1744	Unknown	Dated c. 1744	AMVG, G7	77	
	D. Pedro Miguel de Almeida Portugal e Vasconcelos	1744–1750	Unknown	Dated 18th century	AMVG, R II	147	
	Francisco de Assis de Távora	1750–1754	Unknown	Unknown	-	-	Original portrait missing or destroyed (Note: See Távora affair)
	D. Luís de Mascarenhas	1754–1756	Unknown	Dated 18th century	AMVG, G7	83	
	Manuel de Saldanha e Albuquerque	1758–1765	Unknown	Dated 18th century	AMVG, G7	144	
	D. João José de Melo	1765–1768; 1768–1774	Unknown	Dated 18th century	AMVG, G7	88	
	D. José Pedro da Câmara	1774–1779	Unknown	Dated c. 1779	AMVG, R II	145	
	D. Frederico Guilherme de Sousa Holstein	1779–1786	Unknown	Dated c. 1786	AMVG, G7	134	
	Francisco da Cunha e Meneses	1786–1794	Unknown	Dated 18th century	AMVG, G7	84	
	Francisco António da Veiga Cabral da Câmara	1794–1807	Unknown	Dated 18th century	AMVG, G7	114	
	D. Diogo de Sousa	1816–1821	Unknown	Dated 19th century	AMVG, R II	87	
	D. Diogo de Sousa	1816–1821	Unknown	Dated 19th century	AMVG, R II	140	
	Bernardo Peres da Silva	1835	Unknown	Dated 19th century	AMVG, G8	109	
	José Ferreira Pestana	1844–1851; 1864–1870	Unknown	Dated 19th century	AMVG, R II	138	
	José Joaquim Januário Lapa	1851–1855	Unknown	Dated 19th century	AMVG, G8	88	
	António César de Vasconcelos Correia	1855–1864	Unknown	-	AMVG, G8	-	
	Januário Correia de Almeida	1870–1871	Unknown	Dated 19th century	AMVG, R II	108	
	Joaquim José Macedo e Couto	1871–1875	Unknown	Dated 19th century	AMVG, G8	128	
	Carlos Eugénio Correia da Silva	1882–1885	Unknown	-	AMVG, G8	-	
	Francisco Maria da Cunha	1891	Unknown	Dated 19th century	AMVG, R II	107	
	Francisco Teixeira da Silva	1892–1893	Unknown	Dated 19th century	AMVG, G8	139	
	Rafael Jácome de Andrade	1893–1894; 1895–1896	Unknown	Dated 19th century	AMVG, R II	85	
	Joaquim José Machado	1897–1900	Unknown	Dated 19th century	AMVG, R II	120	
	Eduardo Augusto Rodrigues Galhardo	1900–1905	Unknown	Dated 20th century	AMVG, G8	103	
	Arnaldo de Novais Guedes Rebelo	1905–1907	Unknown	20th century	AMVG, R II	157	
	José Maria de Sousa Horta e Costa	1907–1910	Unknown	20th century	AMVG, R II	156	
	Francisco Couceiro da Costa	1910–1917	Unknown	Dated 20th century	AMVG, R II	104	
	José de Freitas Ribeiro	1917–1919	Constances	Dated 20th century	AMVG, R II	44	
	Jaime Alberto de Castro Morais	1919–1925	Unknown	Dated 20th century	AMVG, R II	112	
	Mariano Martins	1925–1926	Unknown	Dated 20th century	AMVG, G8	111	
	Pedro Francisco Massano de Amorim	1927–1929	Unknown	20th century	AMVG, R II	158	
	João Carlos Craveiro Lopes	1930–1936	Unknown	Dated 20th century	AMVG, G8	102	
	José Ricardo Pereira Cabral	1938–1945	Ettar Gasali	Dated 20th century	AMVG, G8	105	
	Paulo Bénard Guedes	1945–1946	Constances	Dated 20th century	AMVG, G8	47	
	José Ferreira Bossa	1946–1947	Francisco João Santa Cruz	Dated 20th century	AMVG, G8	110	
	Fernando de Quintanilha e Mendonça Dias	1948–1952; 1952–1958	Ettar Gasali	Dated 20th century	AMVG, G8	106	
	Manuel António Vassalo e Silva	1958–1961	Unknown	20th century	AMVG, G8	-	The portrait is a photograph

== Bibliography ==
- Reis, Teresa (2023a). A galeria de retratos dos Vice-Reis e Governadores do Estado da Índia: percurso para a sua reinterpretação e salvaguarda (PDF) (PhD thesis) (in Portuguese). Lisbon: Faculdade de Belas-Artes, University of Lisbon. p. 15.
- Reis, Teresa (2023b). A galeria de retratos dos Vice-Reis e Governadores do Estado da Índia: percurso para a sua reinterpretação e salvaguarda (Anexos) (PhD thesis) (in Portuguese). Lisbon: Faculdade de Belas-Artes, University of Lisbon.
- Machado, A. F.; Valadas, S.; Vandenabeele, P.; Caldeira, A. T.; Piorro, L.; Reis, T.; Candeias, A. (2024). "Combining in situ elemental and molecular analysis: The Viceroys portraits in Old Goa, India" (PDF). Journal of Cultural Heritage. 68. doi:10.1016/j.culher.2024.05.012.
- Reis, Teresa (December 2014). A Galeria dos Vice-Reis e Governadores da Índia Portuguesa: metodologia de intervenção (PDF) (Master's dissertation) (in Portuguese). Porto: Catholic University of Portugal.
