= Portrait Gallery of the Viceroys and Governors of Portuguese India =

Portrait collection depicting the rulers of Portuguese India

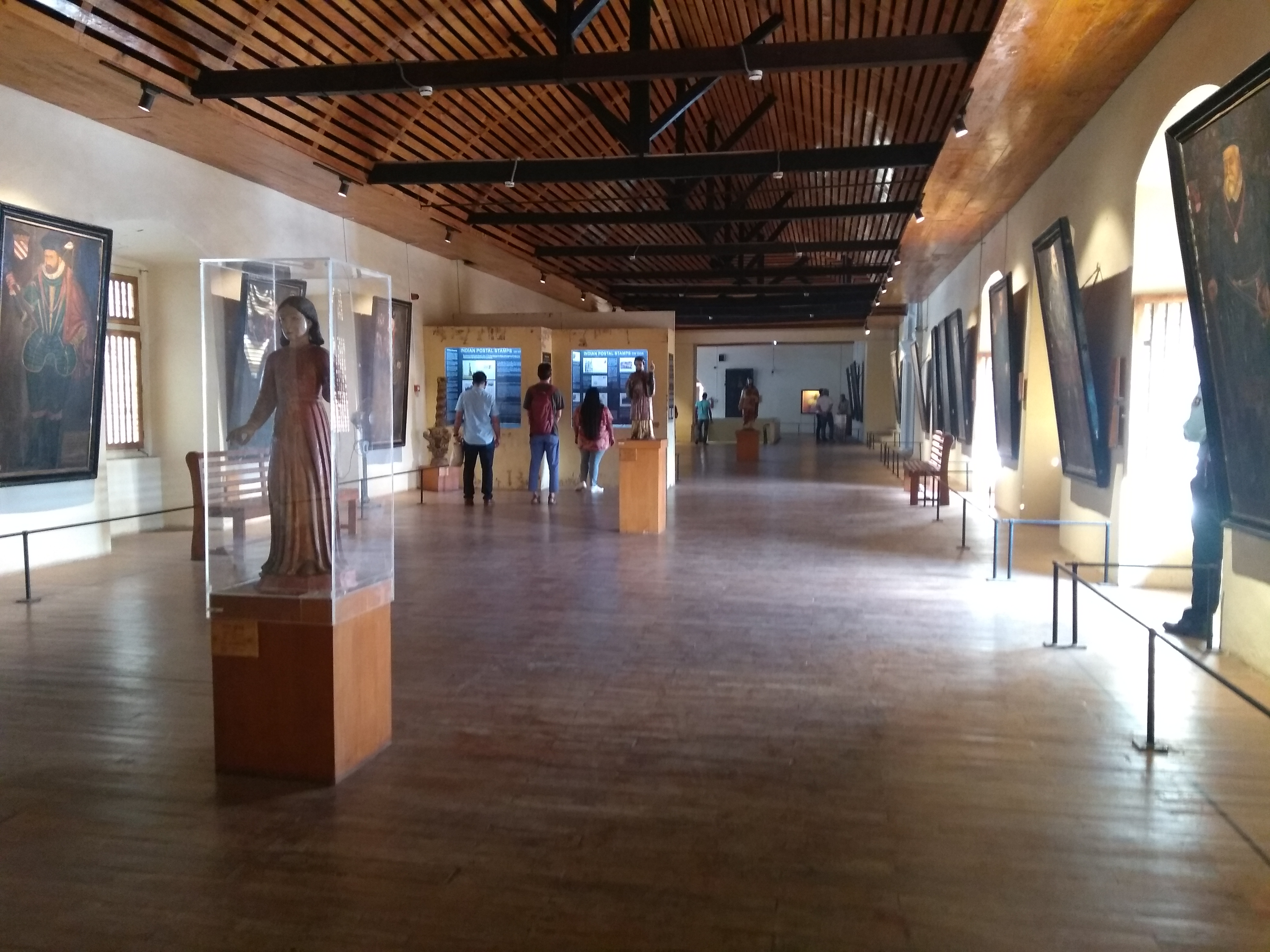
The Viceroys' Gallery

The Portrait Gallery of the Viceroys and Governors of Portuguese India (Portuguese: Galeria de Retratos dos Vice-Reis e Governadores do Estado da Índia), also known as the Viceroys Gallery of Goa, is a historical collection of portraits of the Portuguese governors and viceroys of Portuguese India. The collection originated in Goa in 1547 on the initiative of Viceroy João de Castro and has since then expanded over the centuries. The collection consists of 120 paintings made between 1547 and 1958. Most are preserved at the Archaeological Museum and Portrait Gallery in Old Goa, operated by the Archaeological Survey of India, while three portraits are in the collection of the National Museum of Ancient Art in Lisbon.

== History ==
=== Foundation ===
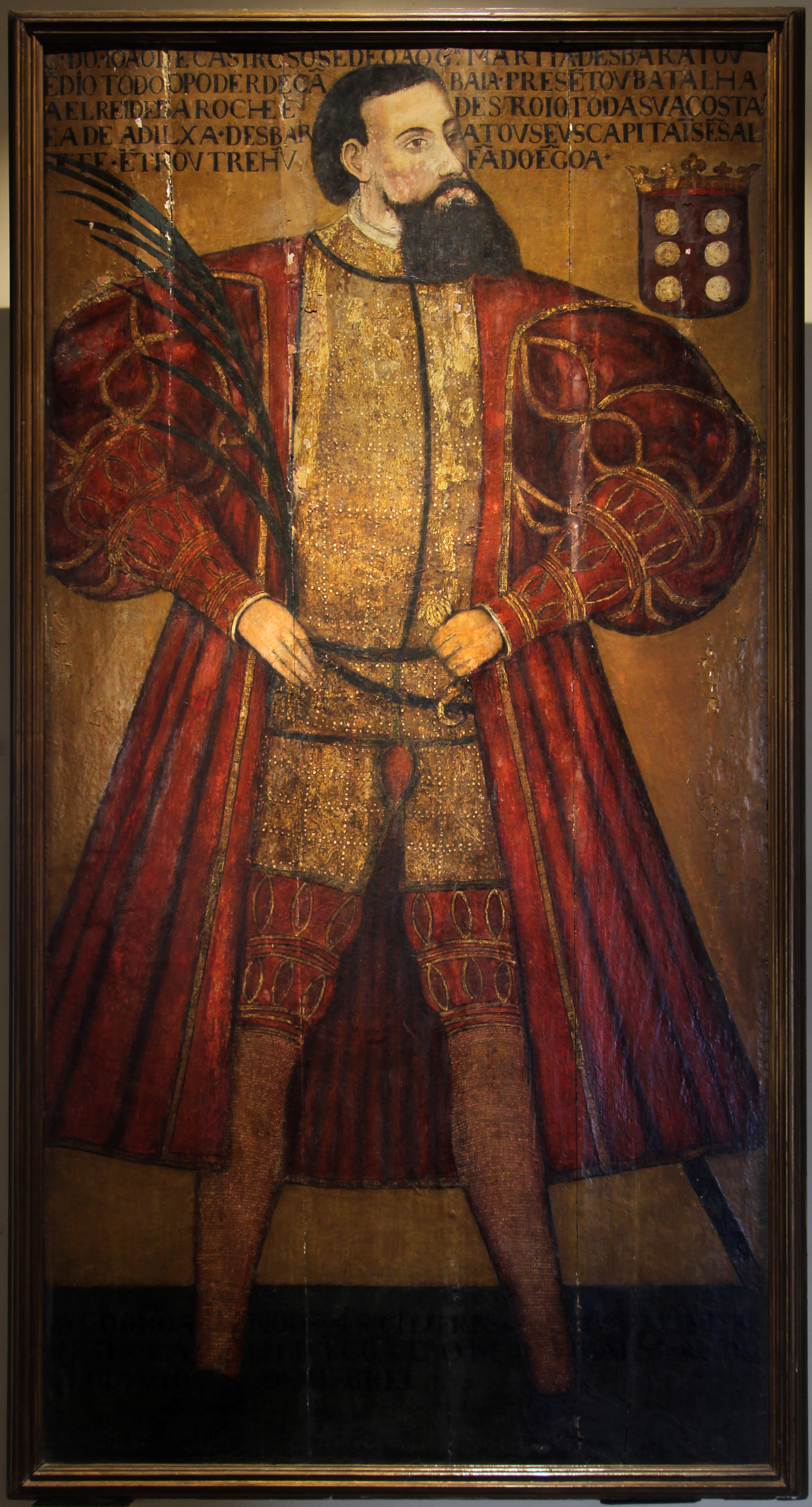
Portrait of João de Castro in the Archaeological Survey of India, Goa

The gallery was established in 1547, when João de Castro commissioned the chronicler Gaspar Correia to prepare portraits of himself and his predecessors. According to Correia, he provided information to a local painter, who produced the portraits in full-length, painted on wooden panels. The governors were depicted in armor and dark silk garments, with their swords and coats of arms, while their names and periods of government were written in gold lettering.

The first series represented Francisco de Almeida, Afonso de Albuquerque, Lopo Soares de Albergaria, Diogo Lopes de Sequeira, Duarte de Meneses, Vasco da Gama, Henrique de Meneses, Lopo Vaz de Sampaio, Nuno da Cunha, Garcia de Noronha, Estêvão da Gama, Martim Afonso de Sousa and João de Castro.

In 1554, Viceroy Pedro Mascarenhas moved the official residence from the Palace of the Sabaio to the Palace of the Fortaleza, and the gallery was subsequently installed there. In 1581, Governor Fernão Teles de Meneses ordered the portraits to be renewed and commissioned missing portraits of governors from the series, from Francisco Barreto to himself.

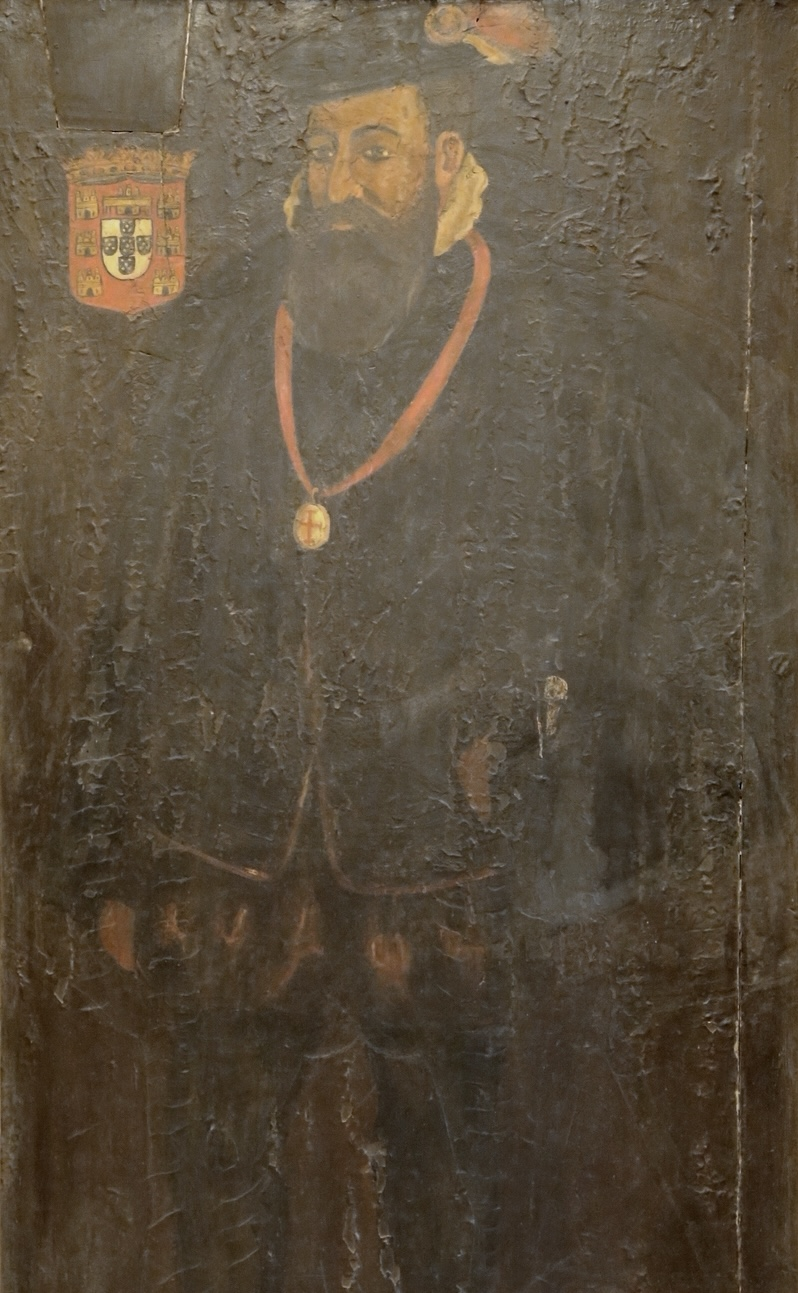
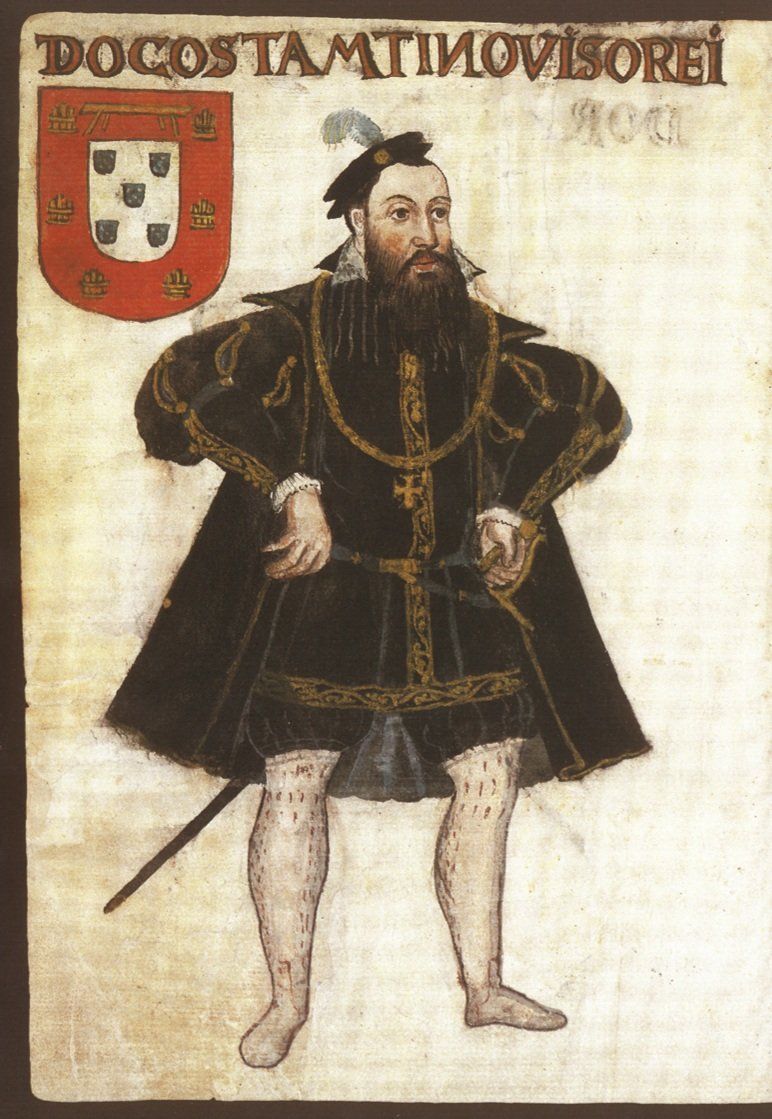
Comparison between the official commissioned portrait of Constantino of Braganza (left) and the replica in the Livro de Lisuarte de Abreu (right).

The earliest surviving color reproductions of the gallery appear in the Livro de Lisuarte de Abreu, made in 1560. The manuscript contains the reproduction of 18 portraits, from Francisco de Almeida to Constantino of Braganza.

=== 19th century interventions ===
In 1825, 47 portraits displayed in the Sala do Dossel were recorded as being in very poor condition and were subjected to retouching and repairs to their frames. Further remodeling took place in 1839.

In 1894, Manuel Gomes da Costa retouched several of the gallery's portraits. Generally considered questionable, his interventions introduced modifications to the poses and elements within the portraits. His overpaints were later removed following the 1951 mission of the Brigada de Estudo dos Monumentos da Índia Portuguesa (Study Squad for the Monuments of the Portuguese India).

=== Transfer to museums ===
Seven portraits were brought to Lisbon between 1953 and 1957 for restoration. Three were subsequently returned to Goa, and João de Castro's portrait was returned in 1961. The remaining three, Francisco de Almeida, Francisco de Mascarenhas and Afonso de Albuquerque, were incorporated into the collection of the National Museum of Ancient Art in Lisbon, in 1982.

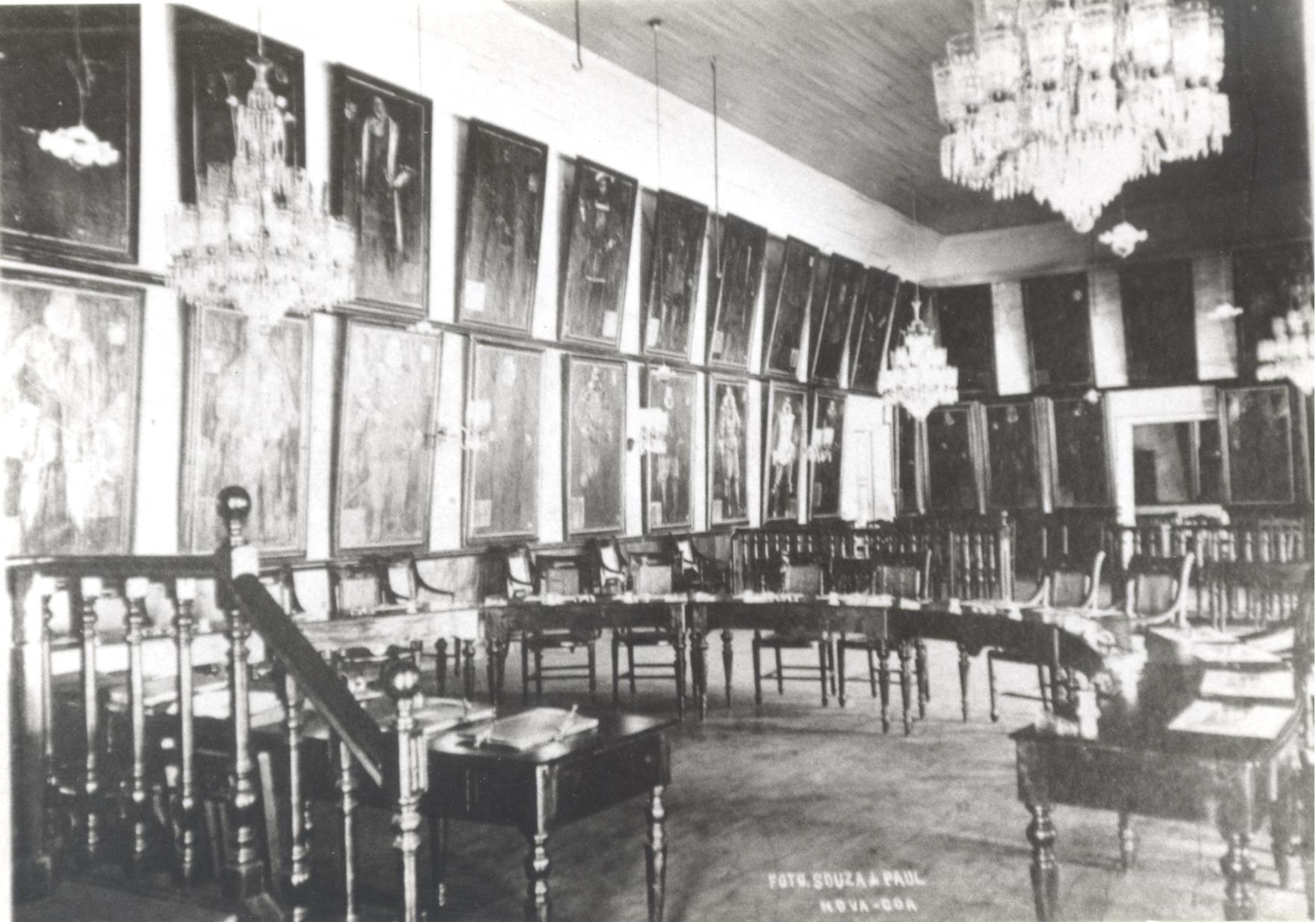
The Viceroys' Gallery in 1930

Since the end of Portuguese rule in Goa in 1961, the collection has been under the tutelage of the Archaeological Survey of India.

== Portraits ==
The collection consists of 120 oil paintings created between 1547 and 1958. 71 are on display and 46 are kept in reserve at the Archaeological Museum and Portrait Gallery in Old Goa, operated by the Archaeological Survey of India, while three portraits are in the collection of the National Museum of Ancient Art in Lisbon. Most of the portraits were probably painted by Goan artists, though most of the artists have not yet been identified. Of these, 88 are on wooden supports (the last of which is dated 1774), 31 on canvas, and one is a photograph (of the last governor, Manuel António Vassalo e Silva).

== Bibliography ==
- Reis, Teresa (2023). A galeria de retratos dos Vice-Reis e Governadores do Estado da Índia: percurso para a sua reinterpretação e salvaguarda (PhD thesis) (in Portuguese). Lisbon: Faculdade de Belas-Artes, University of Lisbon.
- Reis, Teresa (December 2014). A Galeria dos Vice-Reis e Governadores da Índia Portuguesa: metodologia de intervenção (PDF) (Master's dissertation) (in Portuguese). Porto: Catholic University of Portugal.
- Mariz, Vera Félix (2012). "Os trabalhos de restauro de um capitão em 1894 - Os retratos dos vice-reis da Índia (do Archaeological Museum de Goa) e a faceta artística de Gomes da Costa" (PDF). Conservar Património (in Portuguese) (15–16).
- Machado, A. F.; Valadas, S.; Vandenabeele, P.; Caldeira, A. T.; Piorro, L.; Reis, T.; Candeias, A. (2024). "Combining in situ elemental and molecular analysis: The Viceroys portraits in Old Goa, India" (PDF). Journal of Cultural Heritage. 68. doi:10.1016/j.culher.2024.05.012.
