= Joana Josefa de Meneses =

Joana Josefa de Meneses, Countess of Ericeira (Lisbon, 13 September 1651-Lisbon, 26 August 1709) was a Portuguese courtier and writer. She served as dama camarista (Maid of the Bedchamber) to Catherine of Braganza, regent of Portugal. During Catherine's regency government in the 1700s, Meneses was reportedly her adviser in state affairs. She was also active as a writer.

De Meneses was the daughter of Fernando de Meneses, the second Count of Ericeira and married her uncle Luís de Meneses, the third count.

== Selected works ==
- Panegírico ao governo da sereníssima senhora Duquesa de Saboia Maria Joana Baptista (1680)
- Reflexões sobre a misericórdia de Deus em fórma de solilóquios (1694)
- Despertador de Alma ao sonho da vida, em voz de um advertido desengano (1695)
