= Luís de Meneses, 1st Marquis of Louriçal =

His Lordship The Marquis of Louriçal
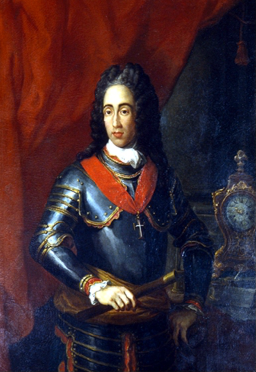
- Portrait by Pompeo Batoni, 18th c.

Viceroy of India
- In office 1717–1720
- Monarch: John V
- Preceded by: Francisco José de Sampaio e Castro
- Succeeded by: Sebastião de Andrade Pessanha
- In office 1740–1742
- Monarch: John V
- Preceded by: Count of Sandomil
- Succeeded by: Council of the Interim Government

Personal details
- Born: 4 November 1689 Lisbon, Portugal
- Died: 1742 (aged 52–53) Goa, India
- Spouse: Ana Xavier de Rohan da Câmara
- Children: Francisco Xavier Rafael de Meneses, 2nd Marquis of Louriçal; Constança Xavier de Meneses; Henrique de Meneses, 3rd Marquis of Louriçal; José Vicente de Meneses; Joana de Meneses; Margarida Xavier de Meneses; Fernando de Meneses

D. Luís Carlos Inácio Xavier de Meneses, 1st Marquis of Louriçal and 5th Count of Ericeira (4 November 1689 – 1742) was a Portuguese nobleman and colonial administrator, who served as Viceroy of India twice. His two tenures as Viceroy were notable for his continued military successes and for his economic rehabilitation policies. His first tenure, between 1717 and 1721, started when he was only 27 years old. His second tenure, between 1740 and 1742 started when he was 51 years old, and arrived in Goa, with six ships and 2,300 soldiers. Power and expansive policies led him to be dubbed the "greatest of the governors of the Orient of the first half of the 18th century."

== Early life ==
Luís Carlos Inácio Xavier de Meneses was born on 4 November 1689, to Francisco Xavier de Meneses, 4th Count of Ericeira, and D. Joana Madalena de Noronha, daughter of Luís Lobo da Silveira, 2nd Count of Sarzedas and Mariana da Silva e Lencastre. He was brother to fr. António da Piedade, a noted clergyman of his time. He grew up under the tutelage of his great uncle, Fernando de Meneses, 2nd Count of Ericeira, and his grandfather, Luís de Meneses, 3rd Count of Ericeira.

== Viceroy of India ==
=== Second government ===
==== The journey to India ====
In 1740, the Count of Ericeira, now Marquis of Louriçal, was nominated Viceroy of India by King John V for the second time. On 7 May 1740, a squadron of six ships sailed to Goa, those were:

- The ship of the line Nossa Senhora da Esperança (70 guns), commanded by Luís de Abreu Prego, known as "the Peg leg", where the Count of Ericeira was boarded;
- The ship Nossa Senhora do Monte do Carmo (74 guns), commanded by D. Francisco Xavier Mascarenhas;
- The ship Nossa Senhora da Conceição (74 guns), commanded by António Carlos Pereira de Sousa;
- The ship Nossa Senhora da Nazaré (50 guns), commanded by Bernardo António Rebelo da Fonseca;
- The frigate Nossa Senhora das Mercês, commanded by Luís de Pierrepont;
- The frigate Bom Jesus de Vila Nova, commanded by José Caetano de Matos.

The squadron was carrying four battalions with 2,300 soldiers from Cascais, Lagos, Peniche and Porto, and 16 new type cannons that shot sixteen rounds per minute, made by the Danish-born Portuguese officer Frederico Weinholtz. On 18 July, near the Cape of Good Hope, the squadron separated, so that the fastest ships could arrive in India taking advantage of the monsoon of this year.

Esperança, which carried the Viceroy, and Monte do Carmo, anchored in the Bay of St. Augustine, with damage and a lot of men with scurvy. They anchored there for 28 days, arriving later in Mozambique Island. Esperança arrived in Goa on 13 May 1741 and Monte do Carmo on 18 May. The rest of the ships also had a lot of problems in the voyage.

Conceição anchored in the Bay of All Saints, because a lot of men died and need for repairs, on 29 October she sailed from it and arrived on Mozambique Island on 11 February, arriving in Goa on 18 May, in the same day as Monte do Carmo.

Nazaré sunk in the entry of the Bay of All Saints, saving the money and the silver that were on board.

Bom Jesus anchored in Rio de Janeiro, with a lot of soldiers dying, that were replaced. This ship arrived in Goa on 1 June 1741.

Mercês also anchored in Rio de Janeiro, where did she continued her voyage to Goa, passing by outside of Mozambique Island, arriving in Goa on 23 February 1741.

From the 2,300 soldiers on board, only 912 soldiers arrived in Goa. Luís de Abreu Prego also died in the voyage.

In a letter to António Guedes Pereira, then the Secretary of State of the Navy and Overseas Domains, the Marquis of Louriçal wrote that the blame for the loss of Nazaré was of "all of the officers, some that insisted to enter the Bay of All Saints in the night, even with fog, heavy rain and rough sea, and others for not opposing with such a certainly disorder, as unfortunately proved."

== Genealogy ==
=== Issue ===
Name	Portrait	Lifespan	Notes
By Ana Xavier de Rohan da Câmara
Francisco Xavier Rafael de Meneses, 2nd Marquis of Louriçal		1711 – 2 May 1742	2nd Marquis of Louriçal, 6th Count of Ericeira; Governor-at-Arms of the Alentejo; never married; no issue.
Constança Xavier de Meneses			Married D. José Félix da Cunha Meneses, Lord of Paio Pires c. 1750.
Henrique de Meneses, 3rd Marquis of Louriçal		5 January 1727 – 29 May 1787	3rd Marquis of Louriçal, 7th Count of Ericeira. Married D. Maria da Glória da Cunha e Meneses, had issue.
José Vicente			
Joana de Meneses			
Margarida de Meneses			
Fernando de Meneses			

== Bibliography ==
- Veríssimo Serrão, Joaquim (1977). História de Portugal (in Portuguese). Vol. V. Lisbon: Editorial Verbo.
