= Henrique de Meneses, 3rd Marquis of Louriçal =

Portuguese nobleman and statesman (1727-1787)

Henrique de Meneses
- Marquis of Louriçal
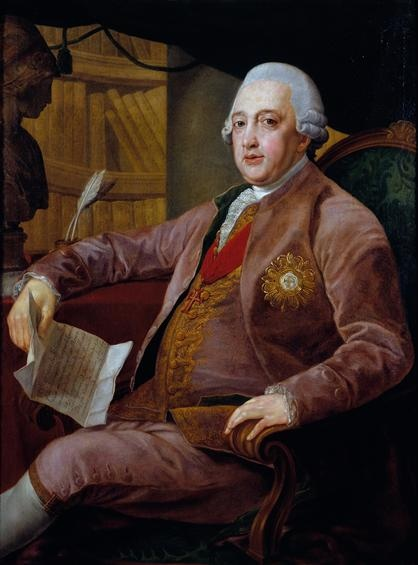
- Born: 5 January 1727
- Died: 29 May 1787 (aged 60)
- Father: Luís Carlos Inácio Xavier de Meneses, 1st Marquis of Louriçal
- Religion: Roman Catholicism

D. Henrique de Meneses, 3rd Marquis of Louriçal and 7th Count of Ericeira (5 January 1727 – 29 May 1787), was a Portuguese nobleman and statesman.

== Career ==
He was the second son of Luís de Meneses, 1st Marquis of Louriçal, Viceroy of Portuguese India.

He was Envoy Extraordinary and Minister Plenipotentiary to Turin (1763-1778) and Rome (1779-1782). He was ambassador to Madrid, in 1785, where he was in charge of negotiating a double marriage treaty between Infante João of Portugal to Carlota Joaquina of Spain and between Infanta Mariana Victoria of Portugal and Infante Gabriel of Spain. For his services, he was awarded the Order of the Golden Fleece.

He succeeded his brother D. Rafael Francisco Xavier de Menezes as Count of Ericeira.

== Family ==
painting in the Palace of Queluz of the Count and his family

He married his niece, the daughter of a sister, D. Maria da Glória da Cunha e Menezes, and had two children :

- Luís Eusébio Maria de Meneses Silveira (1780-1844), 8th Count of Ericeira, 4th Marquis of Louriçal. No issue.
- Constança Inácia Clara de Menezes.

He had two illegitimate sons by D. Maria Antonia Pinto de Sousa Albuquerque Nussane.
