= Luís de Meneses, 3rd Count of Ericeira =

His Lordship The Count of Ericeira
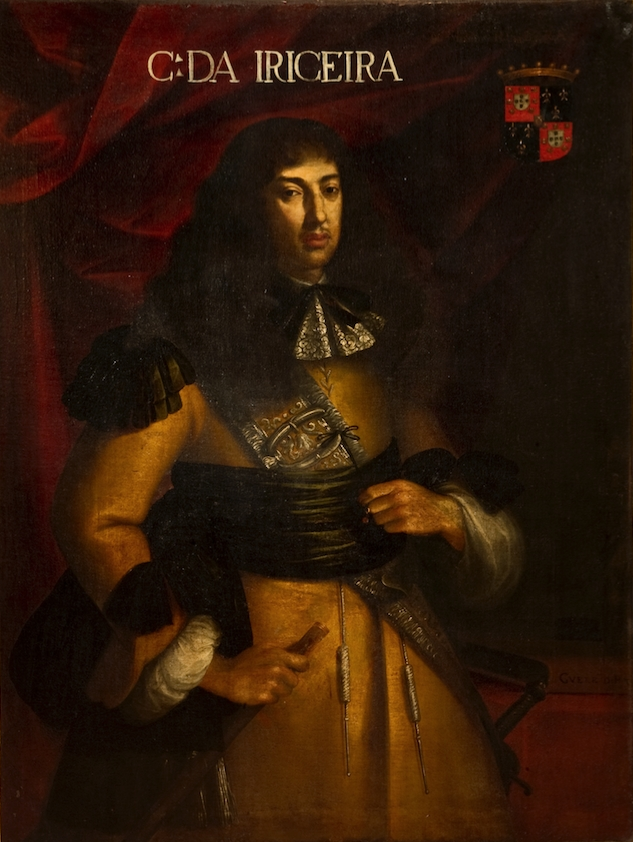
- Portrait by Feliciano de Almeida, c. 1673–75

Comptroller of the Exchequer of the Kingdom of Portugal
- In office 16 October 1675 – 26 May 1690
- Monarch: Peter II

Personal details
- Born: 22 July 1632 Lisbon, Portugal
- Died: 26 May 1690 (aged 57) Lisbon, Portugal
- Citizenship: Portugal
- Spouse: Joana Josefa de Meneses
- Parents: Henrique de Meneses, 5th Lord of Louriçal (father); Margarida de Lima (mother)
- Occupation: Politician, military, historian

Military service
- Allegiance: Kingdom of Portugal
- Battles/wars: Portuguese Restoration War

D. Luís de Meneses, 3rd Count of Ericeira (22 July 1632 — 26 May 1690) was a Portuguese nobleman, military man, historian, and politician.

== Biography ==
He was the second son of D. Henrique de Meneses, 5th Lord of Louriçal and D. Margarida de Lima, daughter of João Gonçalves de Ataíde, 5th Count of Atouguia,

He was commander of São Cipriano de Angueira (St Cyprian), São Martinho de Frazão (St Martin) and São Bartolomeu da Covilhã (St Bartholomew) he was also commander the Order of Christ.

He was eight years old when the Portuguese Restoration War started in 1640, he served under the eldest son of King John IV, Theodosius of Braganza who was later Prince of Brazil; during the war, he was artillery general and later a member of the Council of State. He took part in the Battle of São Miguel in 1658, Battle of the Lines of Elvas in 1659, Battle of Ameixial in 1663 and Battle of Montes Claros in 1665. After the end as a reward for defeating Spanish troops at the countryside of rio Degebe, he received the Lordship of the town of Ansião. After the end of the war, he became Governor-at-Arms of the Province of Trás-os-Montes in 1673. Later he wrote a couple of works related to the war.

Later he was a supporter of the Duke of Beja and the crisis of the aristocracy which led to the abdication of Afonso VI of Portugal on 1667. In 1675, he returned to Lisbon where he was chosen for deputy of the Board of the Three States.

He served as finance minister to the king, Dom Pedro II. His economic policies were noted as being highly mercantilist.

He appeared to have depression, described at the time as "bouts of melancholy"; in 1690 he committed suicide at the palace in Lisbon. He was succeeded by Francisco Xavier Menezes as the Count of Ericeira.

== Selected works ==
- "Compendio panegyrico da vida e acções do Excellentissimo Senhor Luiz Alvares de Tavora, conde de S. João, marquez de Tavora". Lisbon, 1674
- "Historia de Portugal Restaurado (Parte I)". [History of Portugal During the Restoration, Part 1] Lisbon, 1678
- "Historia de Portugal Restaurado (Parte II)". [History of Portugal During the Restoration, Part 1], Lisbon, 1698 - His last work that defended the work including its introduction and the legitimacy of the new Bragança Dynasty.
- "Exemplos de virtudes morales en la vida de Jorge Castrioto, llamado Scanderbeg, principe de los Epirotas y Albanezes, etc.," [Examples of Moral Virtues on the Life of George Castrioto, known as Scanderbeg, Prince of Epirus and the Albanians, etc;]
- "Relação do felice successo que conseguiram as armas do Serenissimo principe D. Pedro, nosso senhor, governadas por Francisco de Tavora, governador e capitão general do reino de Angola, contra a rebellião de D. João, rei das Pedras e Dongo, no mez de dezembro de 1671";, as anonymous and in the same year of impression
- "Soneto em applauso do Panegyrico poetico que dedicou a el rei D. Pedro II o principe Seneschal de Ligne, Marquez de Arronches". Lisbon, 1685 [Modern Portuguese: Soneto em aplauso do Panegirico poético que dedicou á rei D. Pedro II, o príncipe Senechal de Ligne, Marques de Arronches, English: Sonnet in Applause of a Panegyric Poems Dedicated to King Peter II and Prince Senechal de Ligne, Marquis of Arronches]

He also had a few manuscripts mainly written in the Castilian (Spanish) language, two of them were comedies in verse.

Preceded by Fernando de Meneses, 2nd Count of Ericeira	Count of Ericeira; 1632-1690	Succeeded by Francisco Xavier de Meneses, 4th Count of Ericeira
