= Pedro Mascarenhas, 1st Count of Sandomil =

Portuguese nobleman

His Lordship The Count of Sandomil ComC ComSE
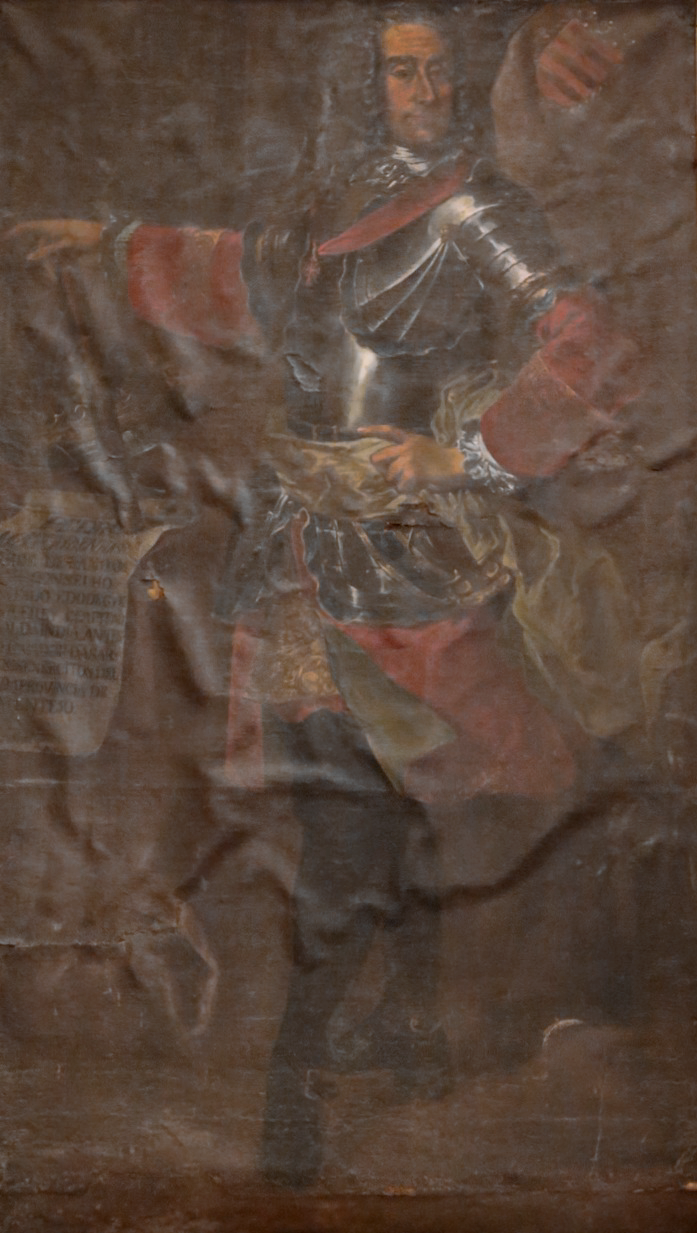
- Anonymous portrait, 18th century (Archaeological Museum)

Viceroy of India
- In office 7 November 1732 – 18 May 1741
- Monarch: John V
- Preceded by: 13th Interim Governing Council
- Succeeded by: Marquis of Louriçal

Personal details
- Born: 9 November 1670
- Died: 3 August 1745 (aged 74) Lisbon, Portugal
- Spouse: D. Margarida Juliana de Távora

Military service
- Allegiance: (Kingdom of Portugal) (Kingdom of Portugal) Portugal
- Branch/service: Portuguese Army
- Rank: Mestre de campo general
- Battles/wars: War of the Spanish Succession

D. Pedro Mascarenhas, 1st Count of Sandomil (9 November 1670 – 3 August 1745), was a Portuguese nobleman and colonial administrator who served as Viceroy of India from 1732 to 1741.

== Early life ==
He was born on 9 November 1670 to D. Fernão Mascarenhas and D. Antónia de Bourbon. He was a commander of the Order of Christ and of the Order of Santiago.

He fought at the War of the Spanish Succession at the rank of Mestre de campo general.

Pedro was married with D. Margarida Juliana de Távora, widow of Francisco Barreto de Meneses and daughter of D. Álvaro José Botelho de Távora, 2nd Count of São Miguel. He was made Count of Sandomil by royal charter of 12 March 1720.

== Viceroy of India ==
The Count of Sandomil was nominated Viceroy of India on 12 March 1732, departing from Lisbon towards Goa on 26 April. After arrivng, he was sworn on 7 November.

His government was effectively disastrous, because in 1739 he lost the Província do Norte (Northern Province), and in 1740 a Portuguese squadron was destroyed and captured by Maratha pirates led by the Angria.

On 18 May 1741, he handed over the government to the Marquis of Louriçal, and on 6 January 1742 he returned to Portugal, arriving in Lisbon in November of the same year.

== Later life ==
The Count of Sandomil died in Lisbon on 3 August 1745.

Preceded by 13th Interim Governing Council of the State of India	Viceroy of Portuguese India; 7 November 1732 – 18 May 1741	Succeeded by Marquis of Louriçal
