= Portrait of Nuno Álvares Botelho =

- Retrato de D. Nuno Álvares Botelho (Portuguese)
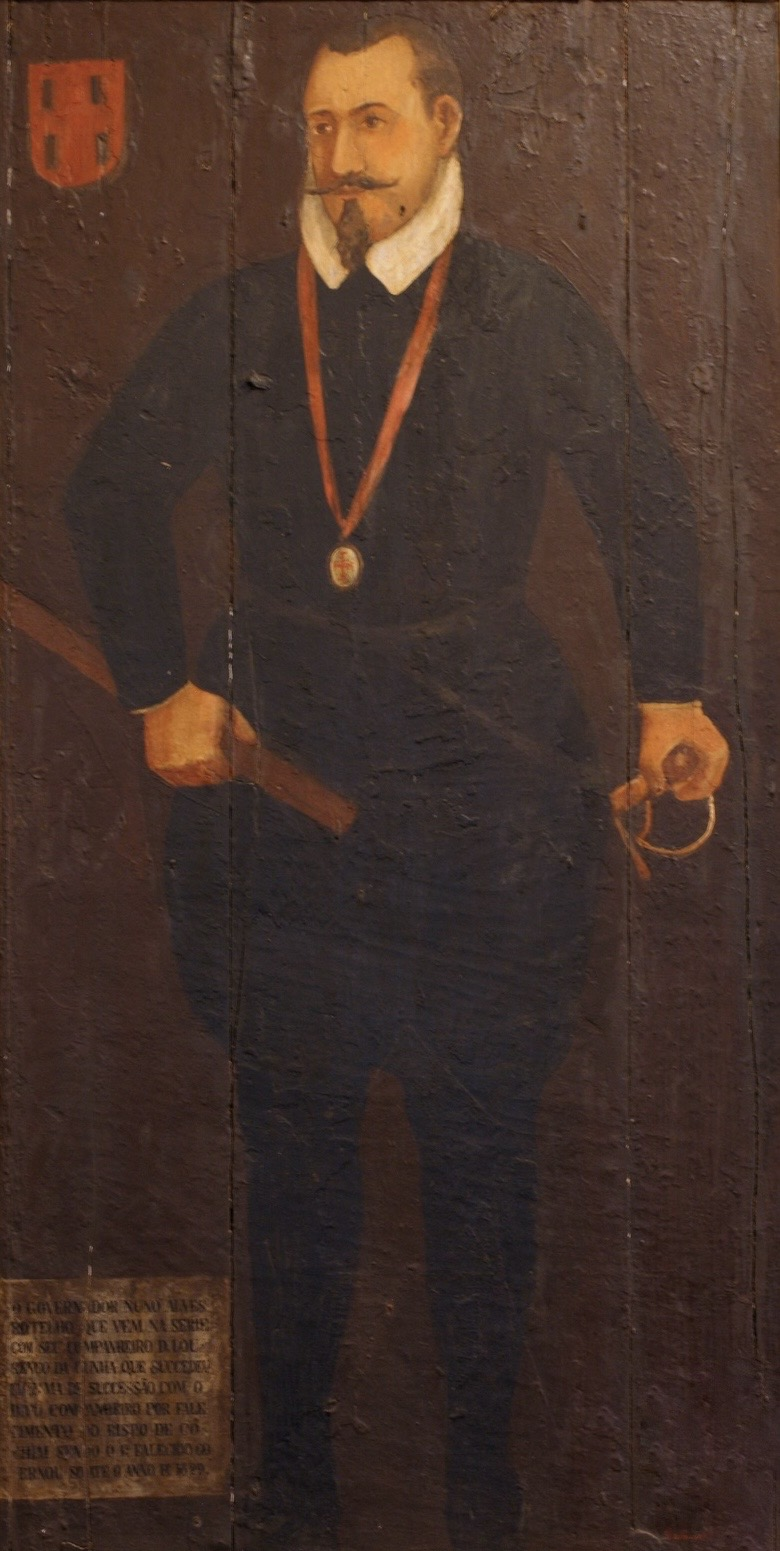
- Artist: Unknown
- Year: c. late 18th century
- Medium: Oil on wood
- Subject: Nuno Álvares Botelho
- Dimensions: 2.05 m × 1.11 m (81 in × 44 in)
- Location: Archaeological Survey of India, Goa
- Accession: acc-no-0097
- Website: Museums of India - National Portal & Digital Repository

The Portrait of Nuno Álvares Botelho is a painting in the Archaeological Survey of India at Goa, India, traditionally identified as a portrait of the Portuguese governor Nuno Álvares Botelho. Scientific examination has revealed that the visible composition of Botelho overlies remnants of a much earlier portrait, which researchers identify as the lost original portrait of Afonso de Albuquerque.

== Description ==
The painting, traditionally identified as a portrait of Nuno Álvares Botelho, is in oils on wood, measures 2.05 m × 1.11 m, and was produced in Goa. The portrait was created around the end of the 18th century.

An 1884 description notes: "With the body facing front and the face turned three-quarters to the right, bareheaded, wearing armor, holding a baton with the right hand and the hilt of the sword with the left. To the subject's left, a helmet can be seen on a piece of furniture". Additionally, the portrait features a coat of arms which does not exist in Portuguese heraldry, and the helmet and table mentioned above are concealed in the painting's current state.

== Bibliography ==
- Reis, Teresa (May 19, 2024). "Searching for the original portrait of Afonso de Albuquerque – new revelations from the Viceroys Gallery of Goa". Conservar Património (in Portuguese). doi:10.14568/cp28800. hdl:10174/36873.
- Reis, Teresa (2023). A galeria de retratos dos Vice-Reis e Governadores do Estado da Índia : percurso para a sua reinterpretação e salvaguardaa (PhD thesis) (in Portuguese). Lisbon: Faculdade de Belas-Artes, University of Lisbon.
