= Count of Ericeira =

Portuguese noble title

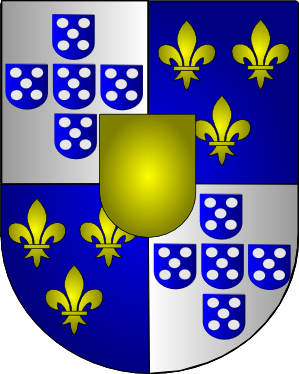
Coat of Arms of the Condes da Ericeira

Count of Ericeira (Portuguese: Conde da Ericeira) was a title created by King Philip III of Portugal, through a 1 March 1622 letter in favour of Diogo de Meneses (1553–1625).

== List of Counts ==
- Diogo de Meneses (1553–1625); 1st Count of Ericeira
- Fernando de Meneses (1625–1699); 2nd Count of Ericeira
- Luís de Meneses (1632–1690); 3rd Count of Ericeira.
- Francisco Xavier de Meneses (1673–1743); 4th Count of Ericeira.
- Luís de Meneses, 1st Marquis of Louriçal (1689–1742); 5th Count of Ericeira, 1st Marquis of Louriçal.
- Francisco Xavier Rafael de Meneses (1711-?); 6th Count of Ericeira, 2nd Marquis of Louriçal.
- Henrique de Meneses, 3rd Marquis of Louriçal (1727-1787); 7th Count of Ericeira, 3rd Marquis of Louriçal.
- Luís Eusébio Maria de Meneses Silveira (1780-1844), 8th Count of Ericeira, 4th Marquis of Louriçal. No issue. Titles became extinct.
