= Portrait of Afonso de Albuquerque =

16th-century Portuguese painting

- Retrato do Vice-Rei Afonso de Albuquerque (Portuguese)
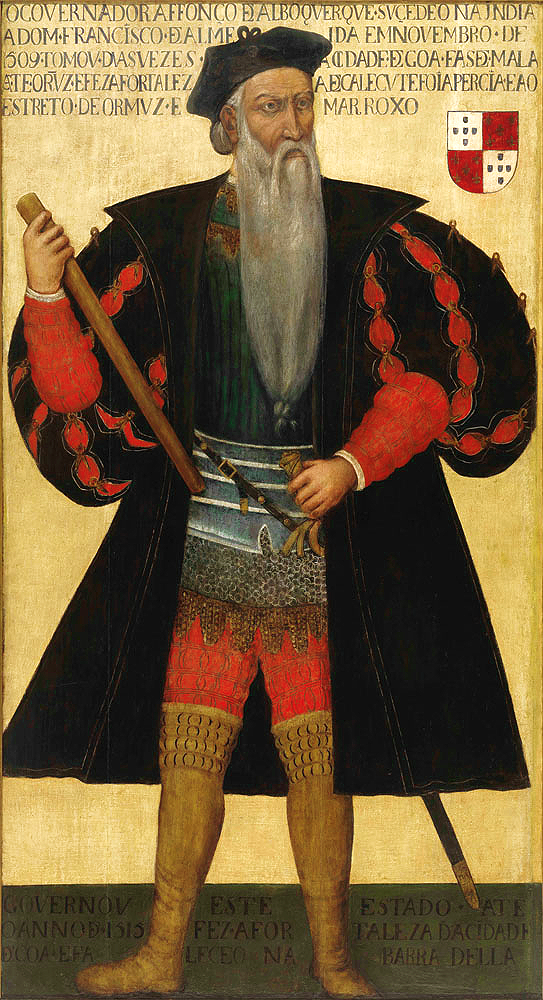
- The painting as it is currently displayed, traditionally identified as Afonso de Albuquerque
- Artist: Unknown
- Year: 1558–1580
- Medium: Mixed technique on wood
- Subject: Afonso de Albuquerque
- Dimensions: 182 cm × 108 cm (72 in × 43 in)
- Location: Museu Nacional de Arte Antiga, Lisbon
- Accession: 2144 Pint
- Website: RAIZ – Bens Culturais Online

The Portrait of Afonso de Albuquerque is a 16th-century painting in the Museu Nacional de Arte Antiga (MNAA) in Lisbon, traditionally identified as a portrait of the Portuguese governor Afonso de Albuquerque. Scientific examination has established that the painting was substantially altered, with the image of Albuquerque having been painted over an earlier portrait of Lopo Soares de Albergaria, while the original portrait of Albuquerque survives beneath a later portrait of Nuno Álvares Botelho.

== Description ==
The painting shows Afonso de Albuquerque standing in full-length, with the baton of command and framed by two explanatory inscriptions of his office and his notable actions. The inscriptions read as following:

O Governador Affonço de Albuquerque succedeo / na India a D. Francisco de Almeida em Novembro de 1509 / tomou duas vezes a cidade de Goa, e as de Malaca ate Ormuz / e fez a Fortaleza de Calicute, foi à Percia e ao Estreito de Or / muz, e mar Rôxo, governou este Estado ate o anno de 1515, / fez a fortaleza da Cidade de Goa e faleceo na barra della.

The Governor Afonso de Albuquerque succeeded in India D. Francisco de Almeida in November 1509, he twice took the city of Goa, and those of Malacca and Ormuz, and built the Fortress of Calicut, went to Persia and to the Strait of Ormuz, and the Red Sea, governed this State until the year 1515, did the fortress of the City of Goa and passed away at its sandbar.

The museum record classifies the work as a painting, measuring 182 × 108 cm, without an identified artist, and notes Goa as the manufacturing center.

Its present appearance is the result of later interventions over an earlier portrait of another governor, Lopo Soares de Albergaria.

== History ==
The portrait belonged to a group of 12 paintings from the Gallery of the Viceroys in the Government Palace at Pangim, which began during the tenure of D. João de Castro. According to Carlos de Azevedo, the portraits were made mainly by local artists. Maria Helena Mendes Pinto points out that this was the only portrait of the collection to leave Goa after the annexation by India.

In 1894, Manuel Gomes da Costa intervened in some of the viceroys' portraits, introducing alterations that are generally characterized as questionable. His overpaints were later removed following the 1951 mission of the Brigada de Estudo dos Monumentos da Índia Portuguesa (Study Squad for the Monuments of the Portuguese India). After the mission and the subsequent interventions of the Museu Nacional de Arte Antiga, the portraits of Afonso de Albuquerque and Francisco de Mascarenhas remained at the museum, while the others were returned to Velha Goa, where they are currently in the Archaeological Museum and Portrait Gallery.

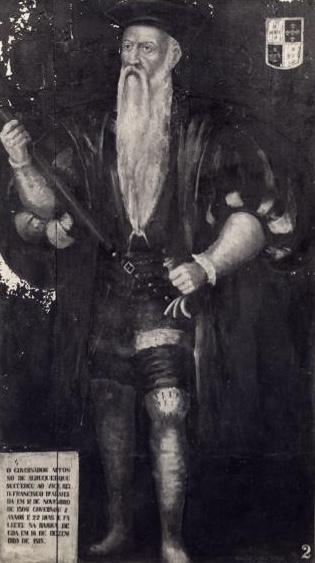
The portrait in 1953, showing the alterations made during the 1894 intervention by Gomes da Costa.

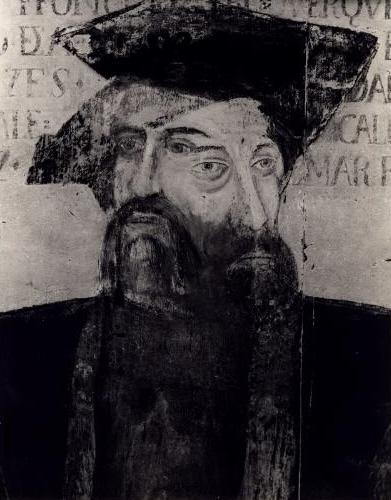
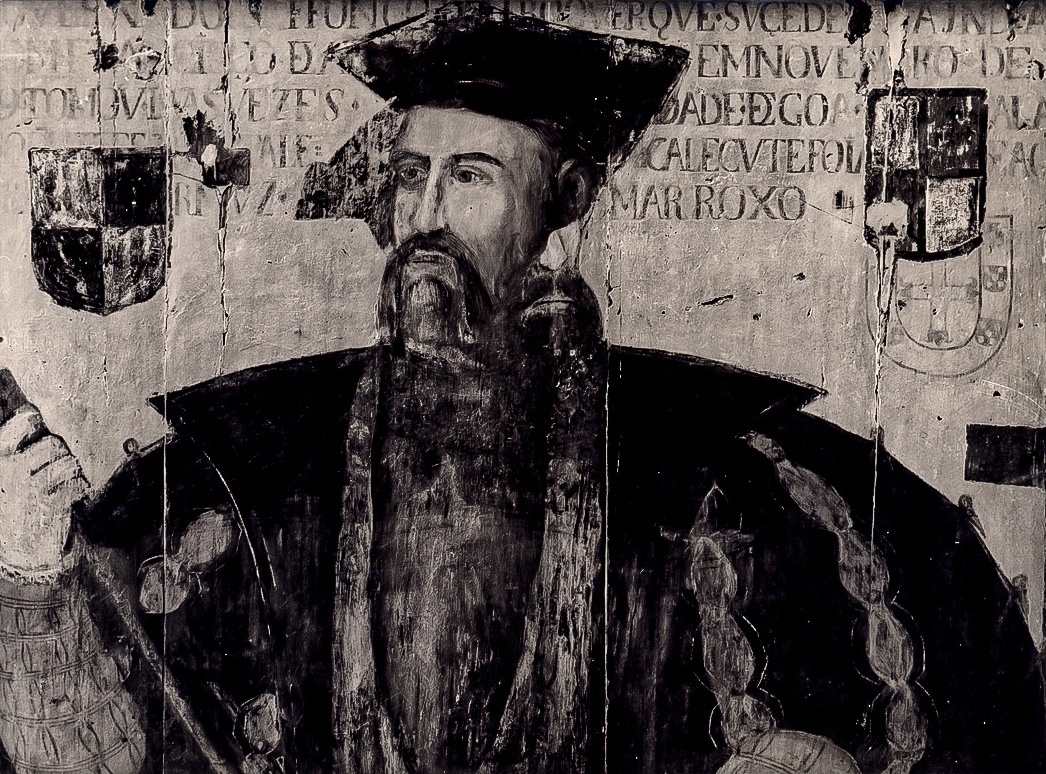
The portrait in 1954–56 during removal of repaints.

In 1953, radiographic examination of the painting at the museum found that it had undergone a complete overpainting. The removal of the white beard exposed a shorter dark beard, while the underlying coat of arms identified the figure as Lopo Soares de Albergaria, who had succeeded Albuquerque as governor in 1515. The white beard and Albuquerque's coat of arms were later reinserted and the painting returned to Goa in 1960.

== Scientific examination ==
A 2024 study reports that previous research had already established that the portrait exhibited in Lisbon resulted from successive interventions over a painting of another governor. Thus, the study sought to identify the original portrait and to understand how the panel was reused over time.

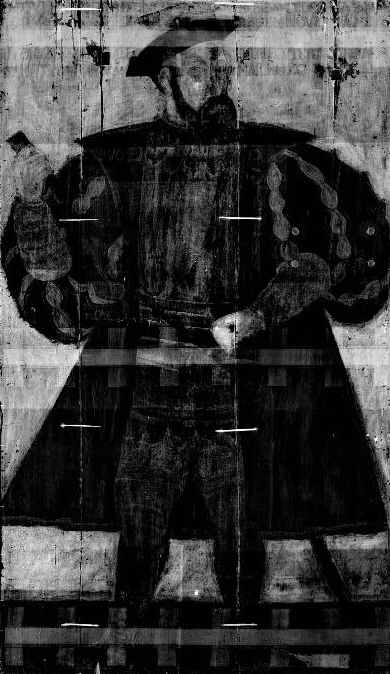
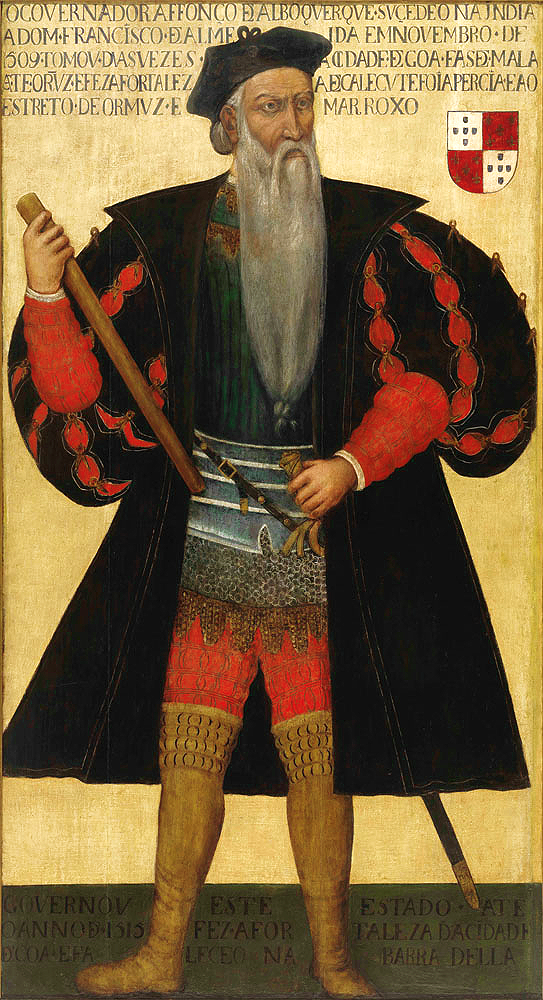
X-ray exam revealing the original portrait of Lopo Soares de Albergaria (left) beneath the overpaint (right).

The study states that the iconographic features traditionally associated with Albuquerque, including the long white beard and coat of arms, had been painted over the figure of Lopo Soares de Albergaria. These additions allegedly took place during an 18th century intervention that affected 50 portraits from the collection, and the overpaint was only removed in a 1953–1956 restoration at the former Instituto para o Exame e Restauro de Obras de Arte (IEROA). The overlap of two figures and two coats of arms was first identified in the Oficina de Beneficiação de Pintura Antiga (OBPA).

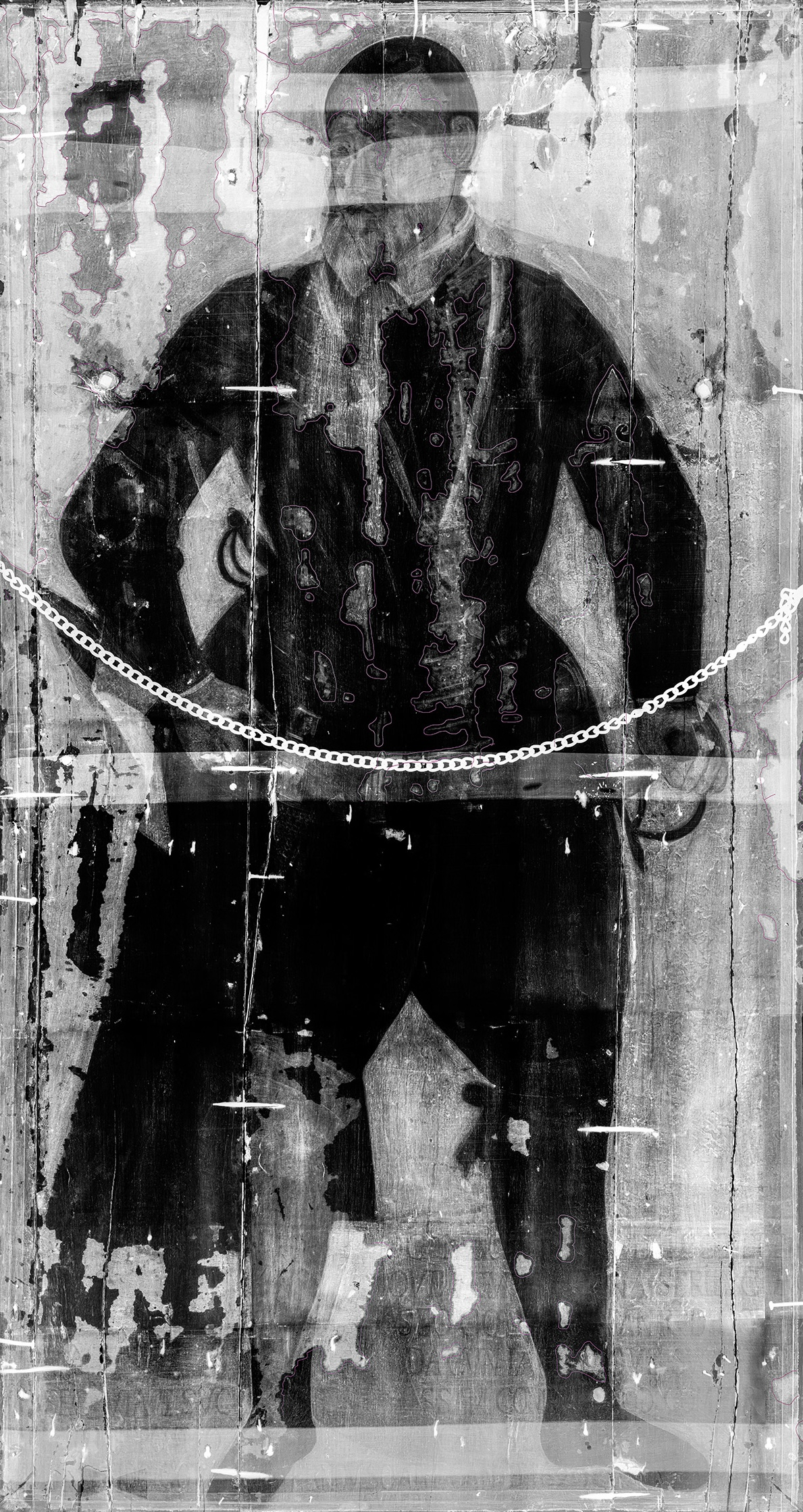
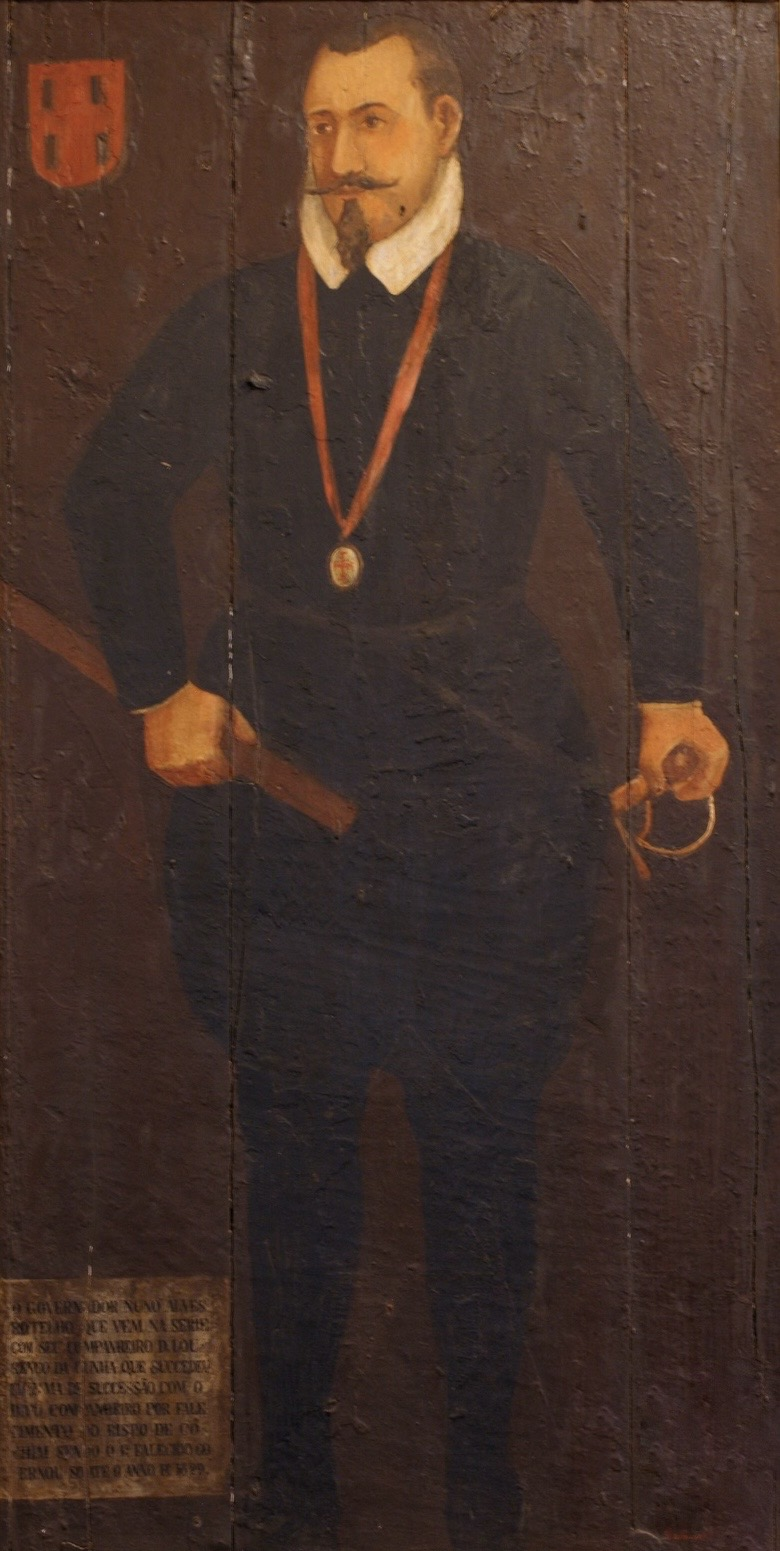
X-ray exam (left) revealing the lost portrait of Afonso de Albuquerque underlying the composition of Nuno Álvares Botelho (right).

The study also concludes that the lost portrait of Afonso de Albuquerque survives only in remnants beneath a later composition of Nuno Álvares Botelho, which was itself modified in the 19th century. The authors argue that, because the figure of Lopo Soares de Albergaria was physically closer and in better condition, the most recognizable elements of Albuquerque were subsequently transferred to that portrait.

== Bibliography ==
- Reis, Teresa (May 19, 2024). "Searching for the original portrait of Afonso de Albuquerque – new revelations from the Viceroys Gallery of Goa". Conservar Património (in Portuguese). doi:10.14568/cp28800. hdl:10174/36873.
- Mariz, Vera Félix (2012). "Os trabalhos de restauro de um capitão em 1894 - Os retratos dos vice-reis da Índia (do Archaeological Museum de Goa) e a faceta artística de Gomes da Costa" (PDF). Conservar Património (in Portuguese) (15–16).
