= Henrique de Meneses =

Portuguese nobleman

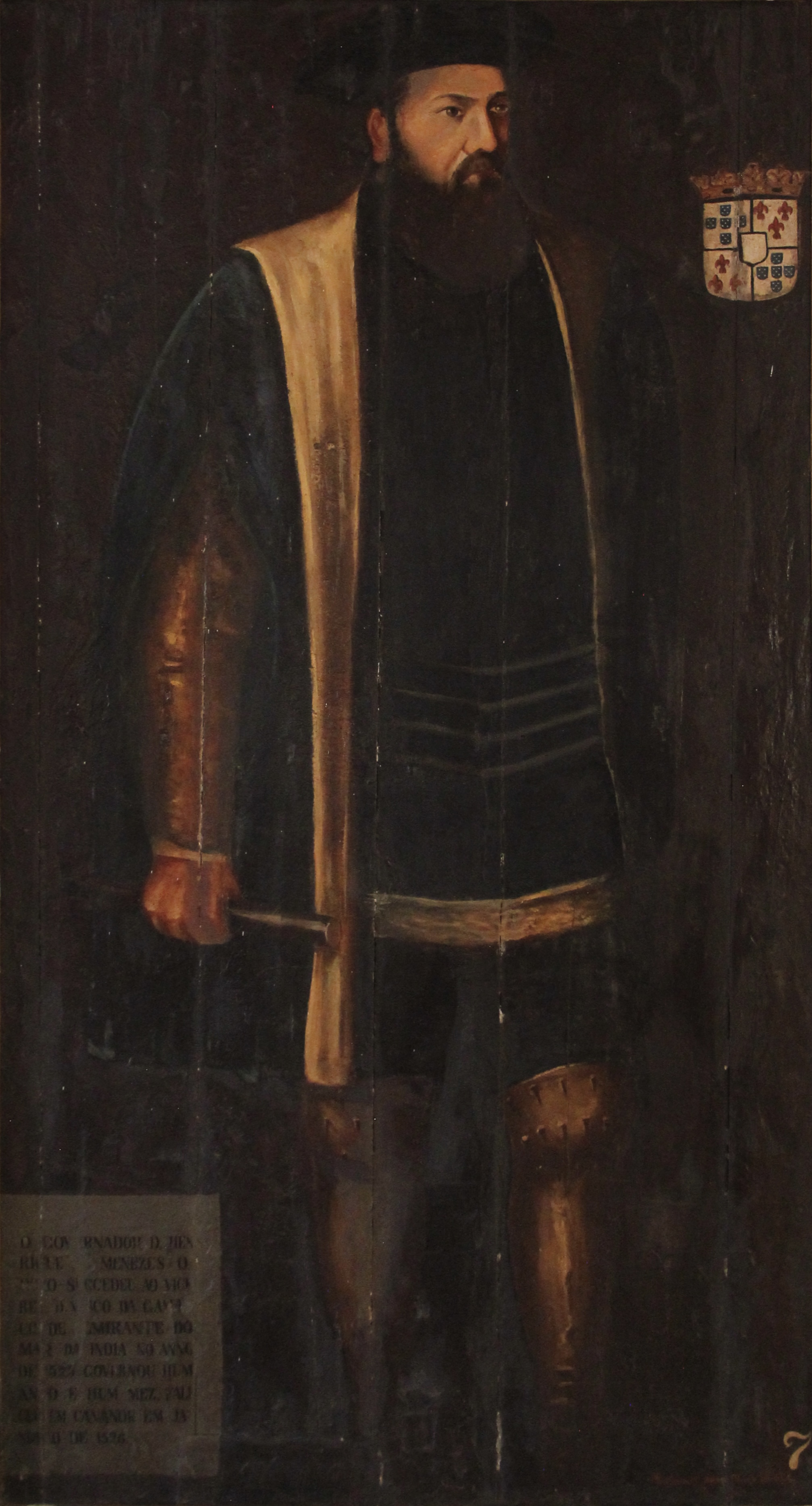

Governor of India
- In office 1524–1526
- Monarch: John III
- Preceded by: Vasco da Gama
- Succeeded by: Lopo Vaz de Sampaio

Personal details
- Born: 1496 Lisbon, Portugal
- Died: 21 February 1526 (aged 29–30) Cannanore, India

D. Henrique de Meneses, 2nd Lord of Louriçal (1496 – 21 February 1526) was a Portuguese nobleman and colonial administrator, Governor of India from 1521 to 1524. He was born in Lisbon in 1496 and died in Cannanore on 21 February 1526. He was the nephew of Diogo Lopes de Sequeira.
