= Lopo Vaz de Sampaio =

Portuguese colonial governor (c. 1480–1534)

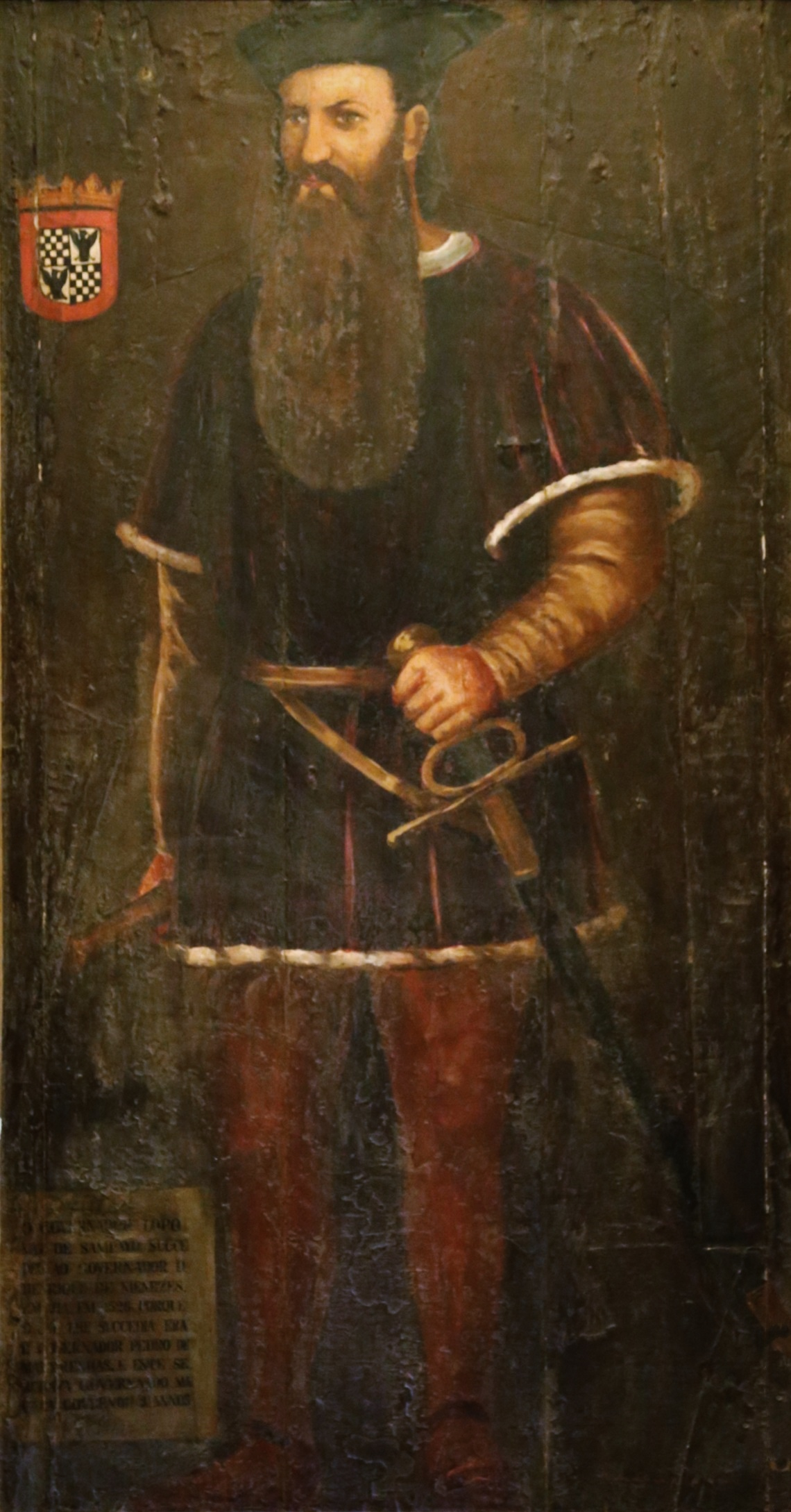

Governor of India
- In office 1526–1529
- Monarch: John III
- Preceded by: Henrique de Meneses
- Succeeded by: Nuno da Cunha

Personal details
- Born: c. 1480 Carrazeda de Ansiães, Kingdom of Portugal
- Died: 1534 Lisbon, Kingdom of Portugal

Lopo Vaz de Sampaio was the 6th Governor of Portuguese India from 1526 to 1529. He was also the captain of Vasco da Gama, a famous Portuguese explorer. During 1528–29, Lopo Vaz de Sampaio seized the fort of Mahim from the Gujarat Sultanate, when the King was at war with Nizam-ul-mulk, the emperor of Chaul, a town south of Bombay.
