= Louriçal =

- Civil parish
- Location in Portugal
- Coordinates: 40.003°N 8.737°W
- Country: Portugal
- Region: Centro
- Intermunic. comm.: Região de Leiria
- District: Leiria
- Municipality: Pombal

Area
  - Total: 47.66 km^{2} (18.40 sq mi)

Population (2011)
  - Total: 4,645
  - Density: 97/km^{2} (250/sq mi)
- Time zone: UTC+00:00 (WET)
  - Summer (DST): UTC+01:00 (WEST)
- Postal code: 3105-165
- Website: https://web.archive.org/web/20080511182917/http://www.lourical.pt/

Louriçal is a Portuguese freguesia ("civil parish") of Pombal municipality. The population in 2011 was 4,645, in an area of 47.66 km^{2}.

In the past it was a parish of Roman Catholic Diocese of Coimbra. It was the municipality seat town until 1855. It comprises the parishes of the town and Mata Mourisca. It had 212 km^{2} and 5 526 people in 1801 and 5 654 people in 1849.

The following localities belong to the parish of Louriçal: Antões, Barroca do Outeiro, Borda do Rio, Cabeços do Outeiro, Casais de Além, Casais do Porto, Casais Loureiros, Casal da Rola, Casal do Queijo, Casal Mouro, Casas Brancas, Castelhanas, Cavadas, Cavaditas, Cipreste, Enjoa, Espinheiras, Foitos, Furadouro, Louriçal, Matas, Matos da Vila, Moita do Boi, Outeiro, Ribeira de Santo Amaro, Santo António, São João, Serafim, Torneira, Valarinho, Vale da Cabra.

== Gallery ==
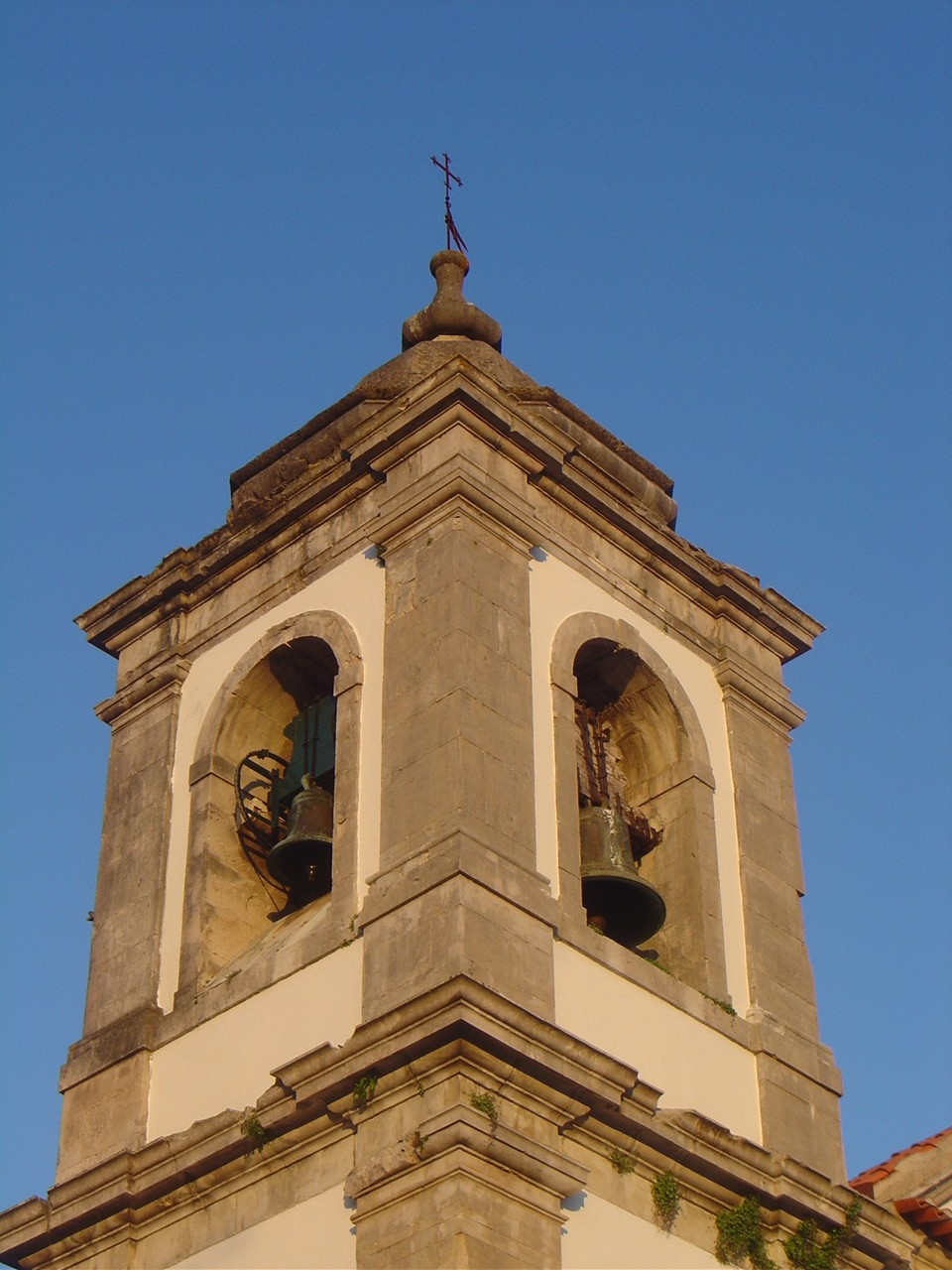

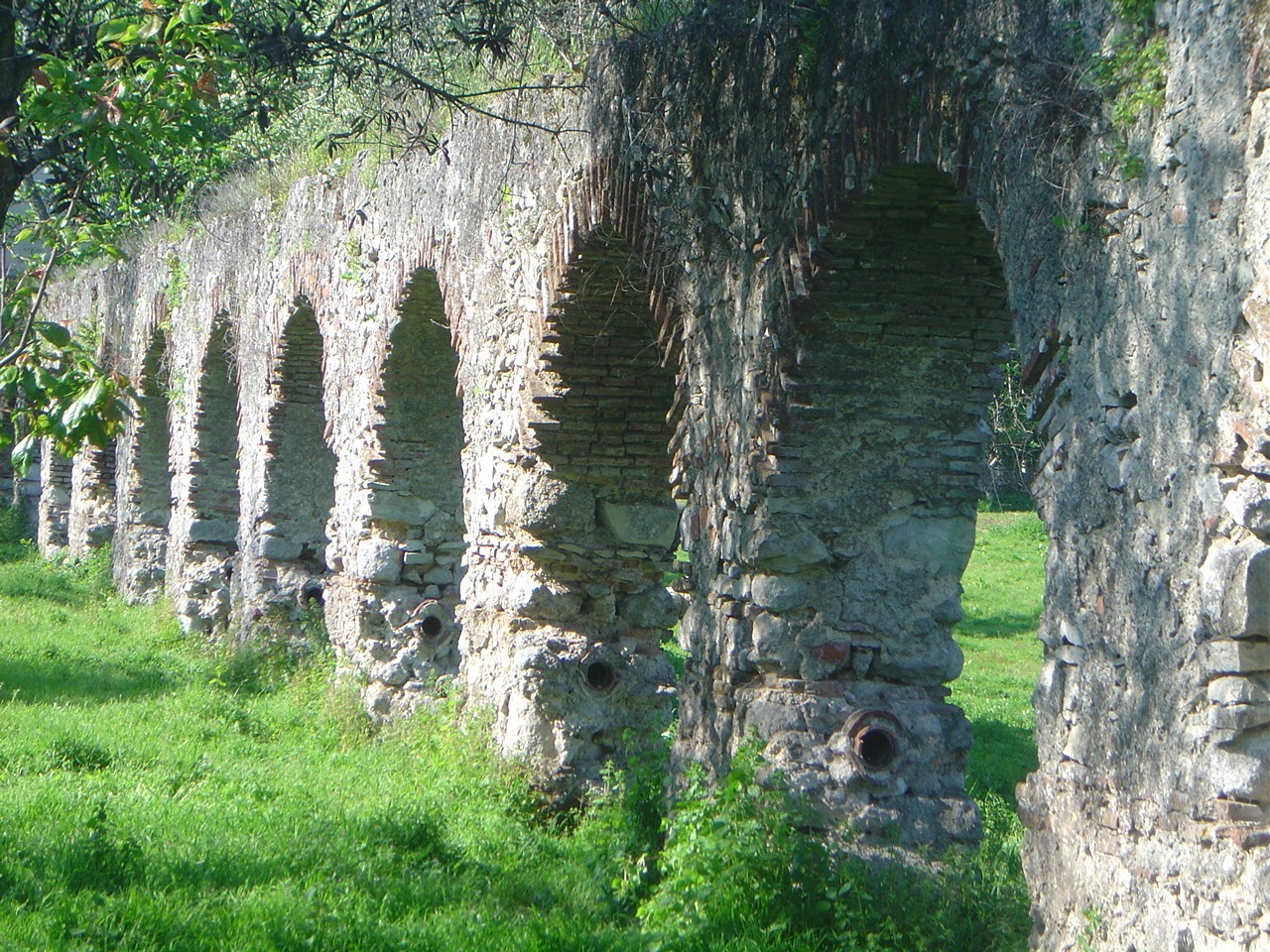

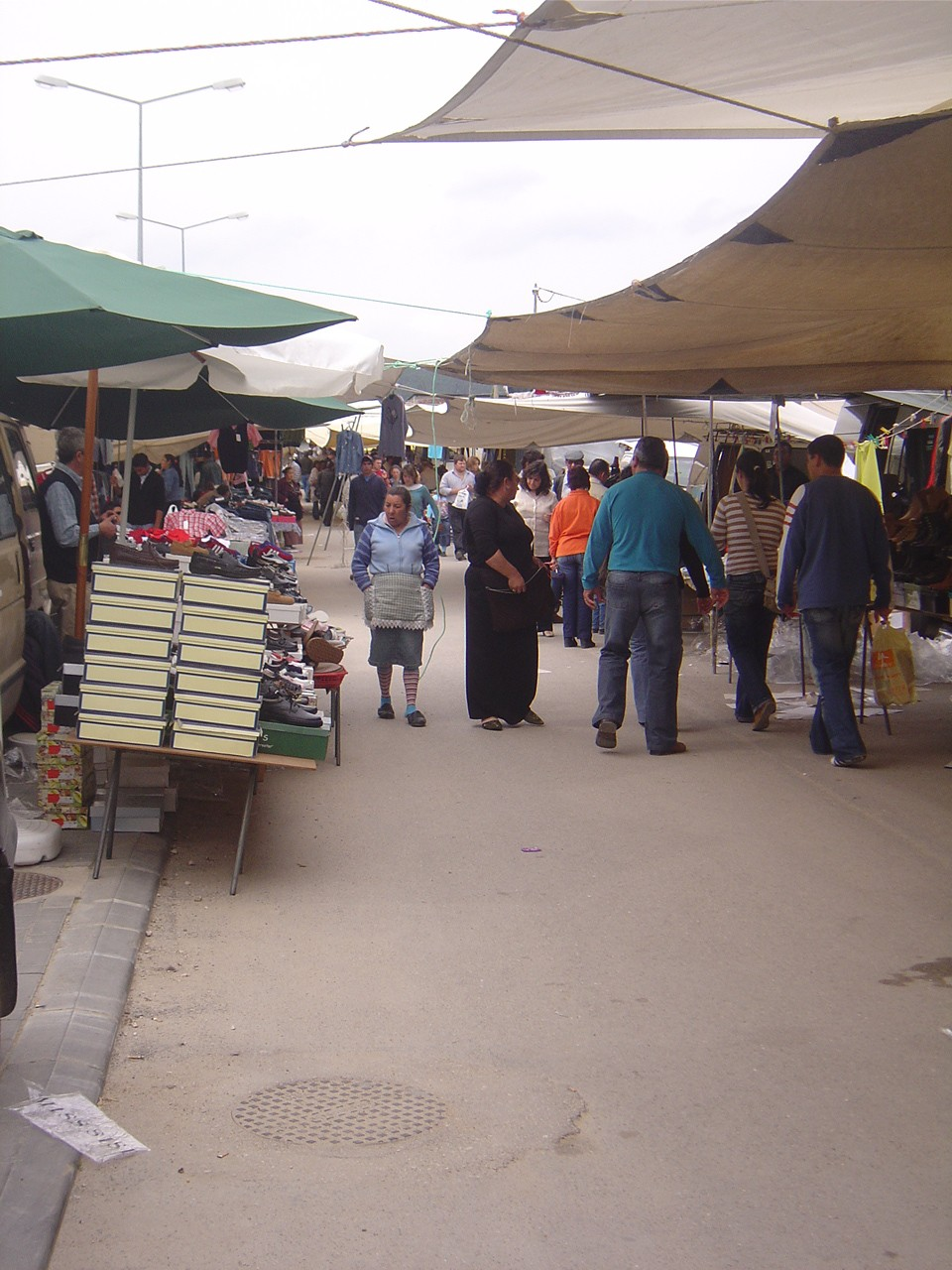

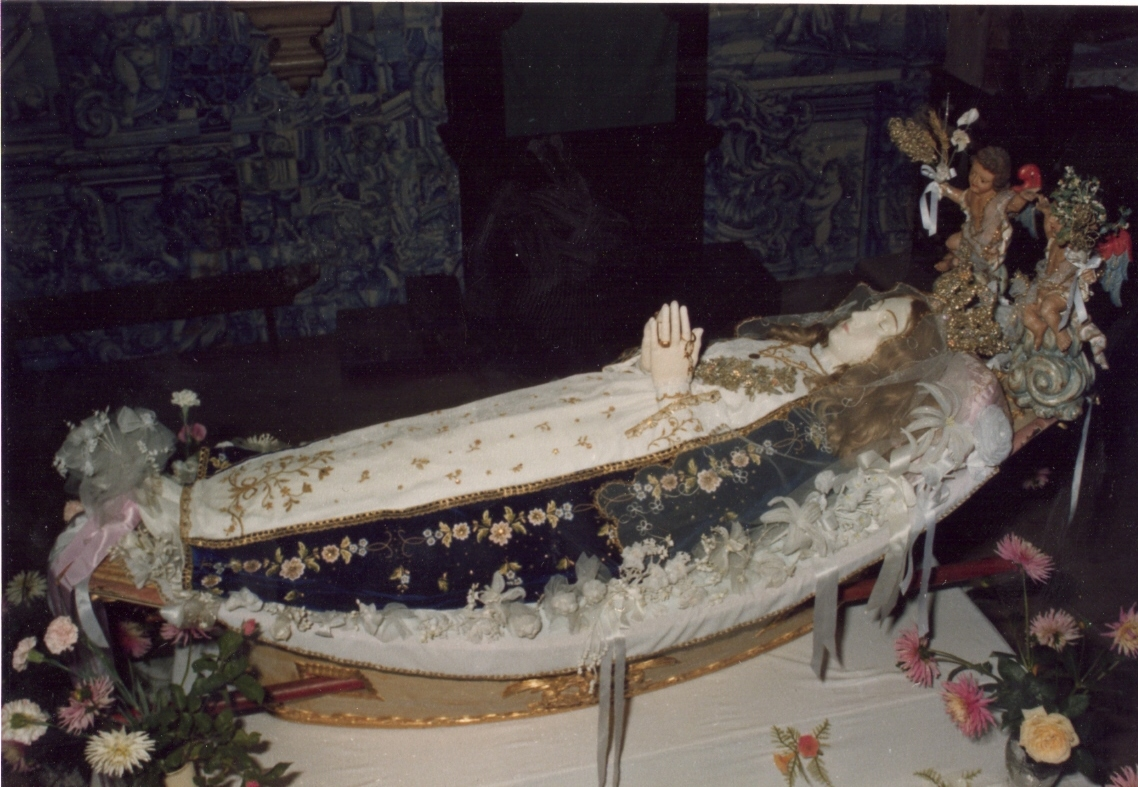

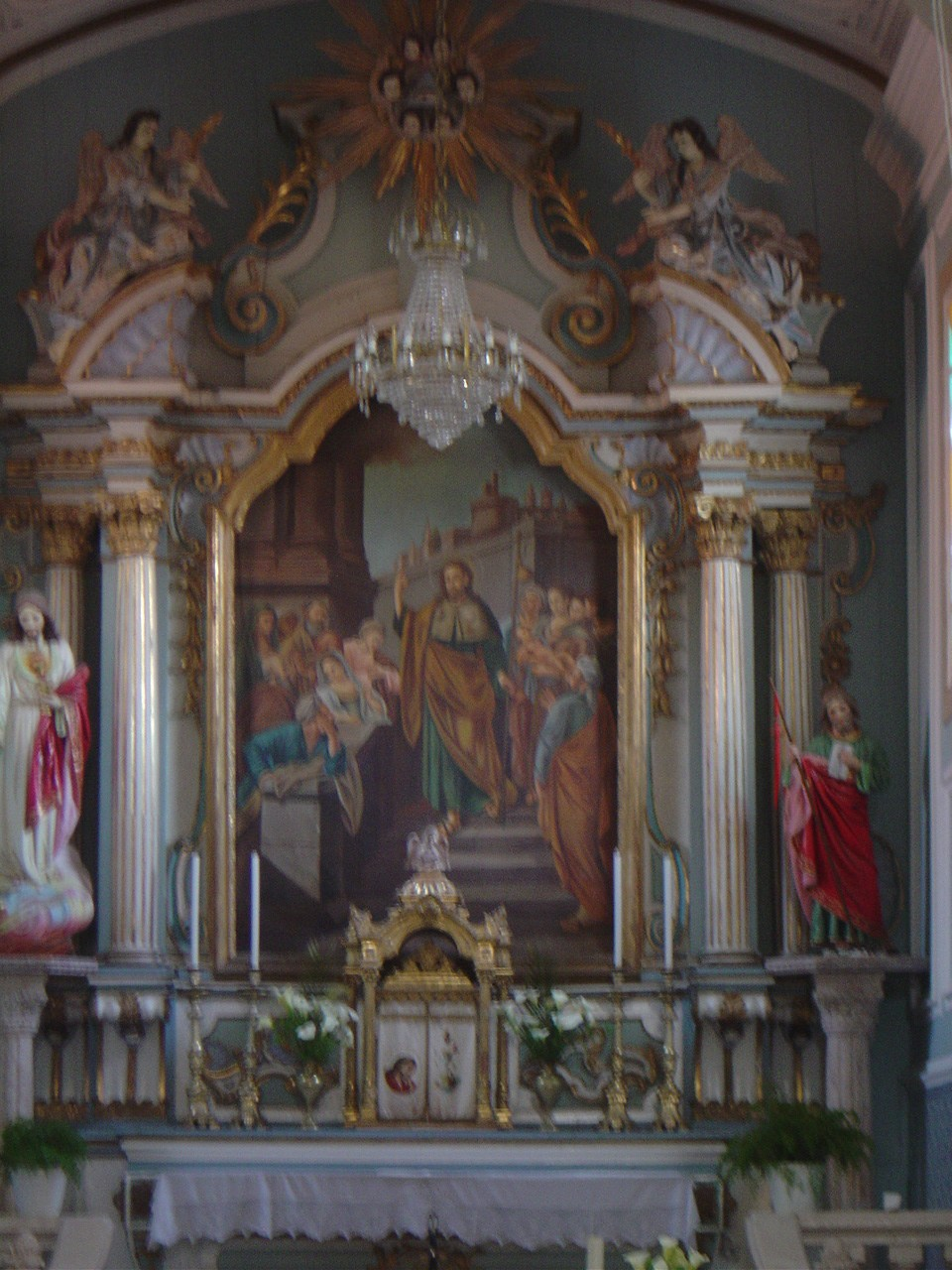

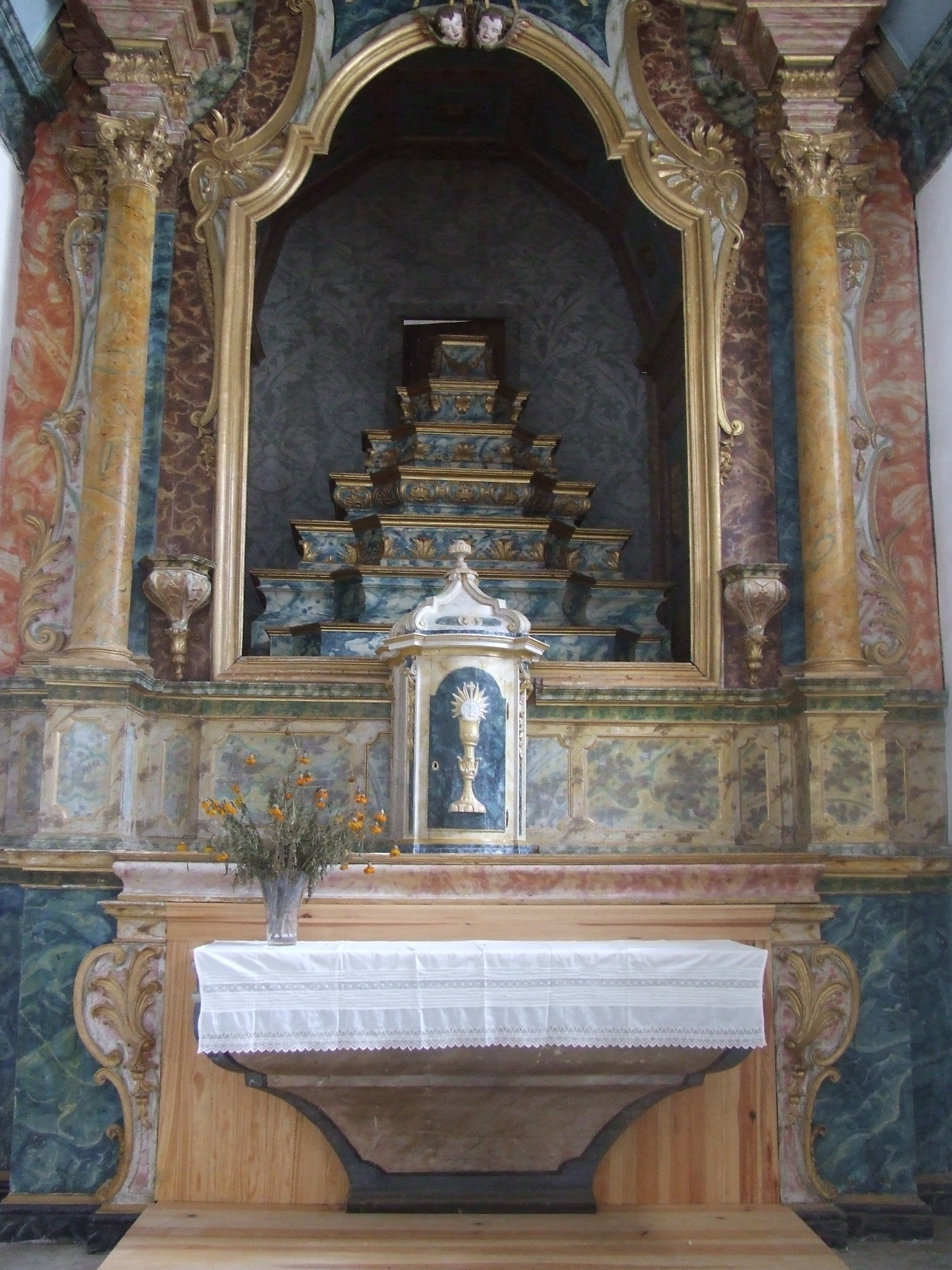
