= Archaeological Museum and Portrait Gallery =

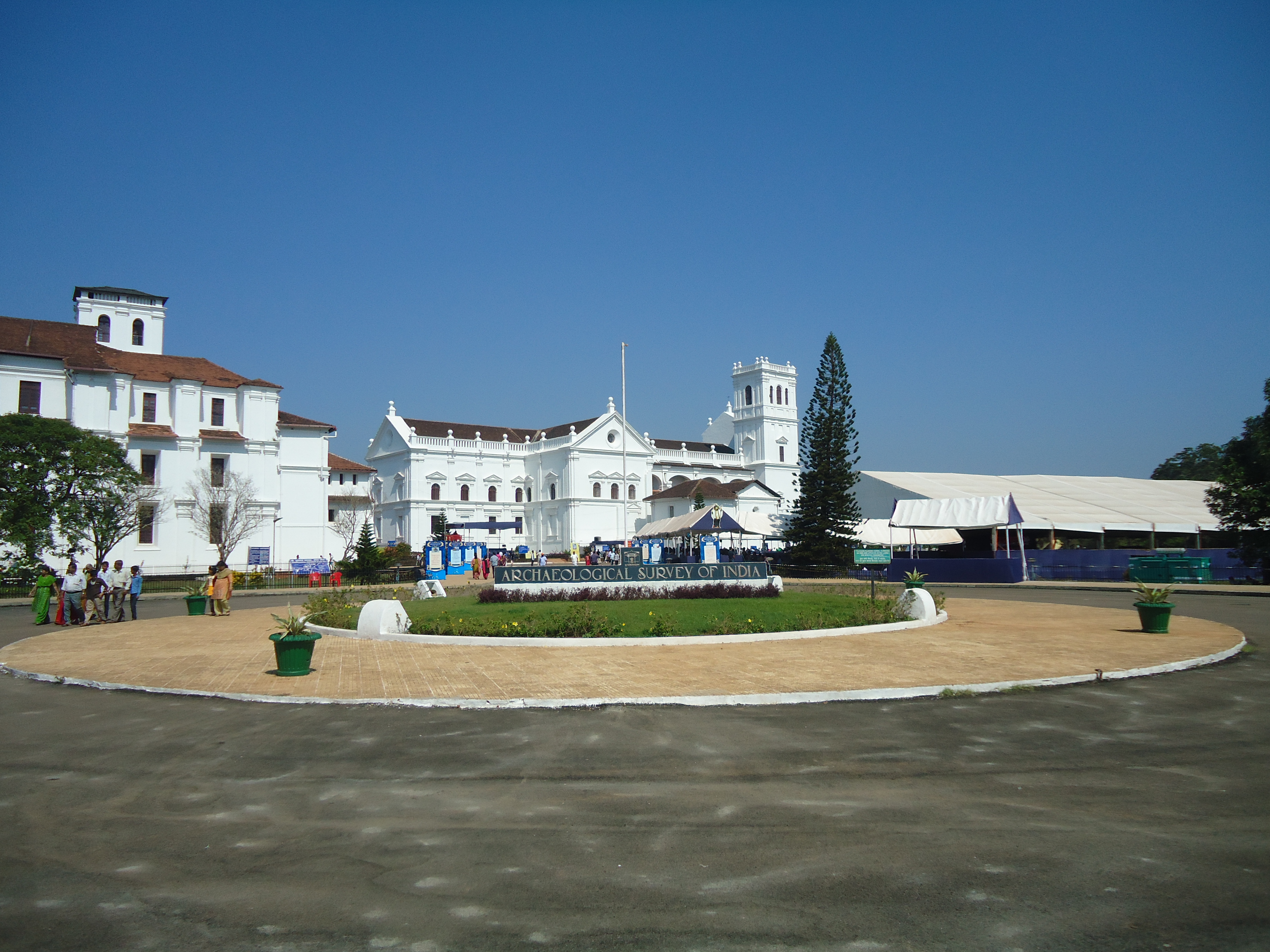
- Archaeological Museum and Church of St. Francis of Assisi in Goa
- Established: 1964; 62 years ago
- Location: Goa, India
- Coordinates: 15.5024769°N 73.91151°E
- Type: Archaeological Museum
- Website: asi.nic.in

Archaeological Museum and Portrait Gallery was set up in 1964, NS reorganised in 1981–82. It is run by the Government of India's Archaeological Survey of India and is situated in the former Portuguese colonial capital of Old Goa, a historic one-time city which now attracts a large number of tourists.

== Location ==
The museum and portrait gallery is situated in the convent section of the Church and Convent of St. Francis of Assisi.

== On display ==
Items on display are included as part of eight galleries, comprising the Portuguese rule in Goa, and also the pre-historic and early historic periods of Goan history. The late Medieval period is well covered. There are also portraits of Governors and Viceroys of colonial Goa.

Besides this, there are postage stamps, wooden sculptures, pillars and other objects. Artificial and natural lighting is used for the display. The larger-than-life statue of the Portuguese epic poet Luís de Camões is particularly noteworthy. There are also hero stones, sati stones, Persian and Arabic inscriptions, Portuguese weapons (rifles, swords, daggers). Video shows are available to visitors, and there is a publication sale-counter.

== Gallery ==
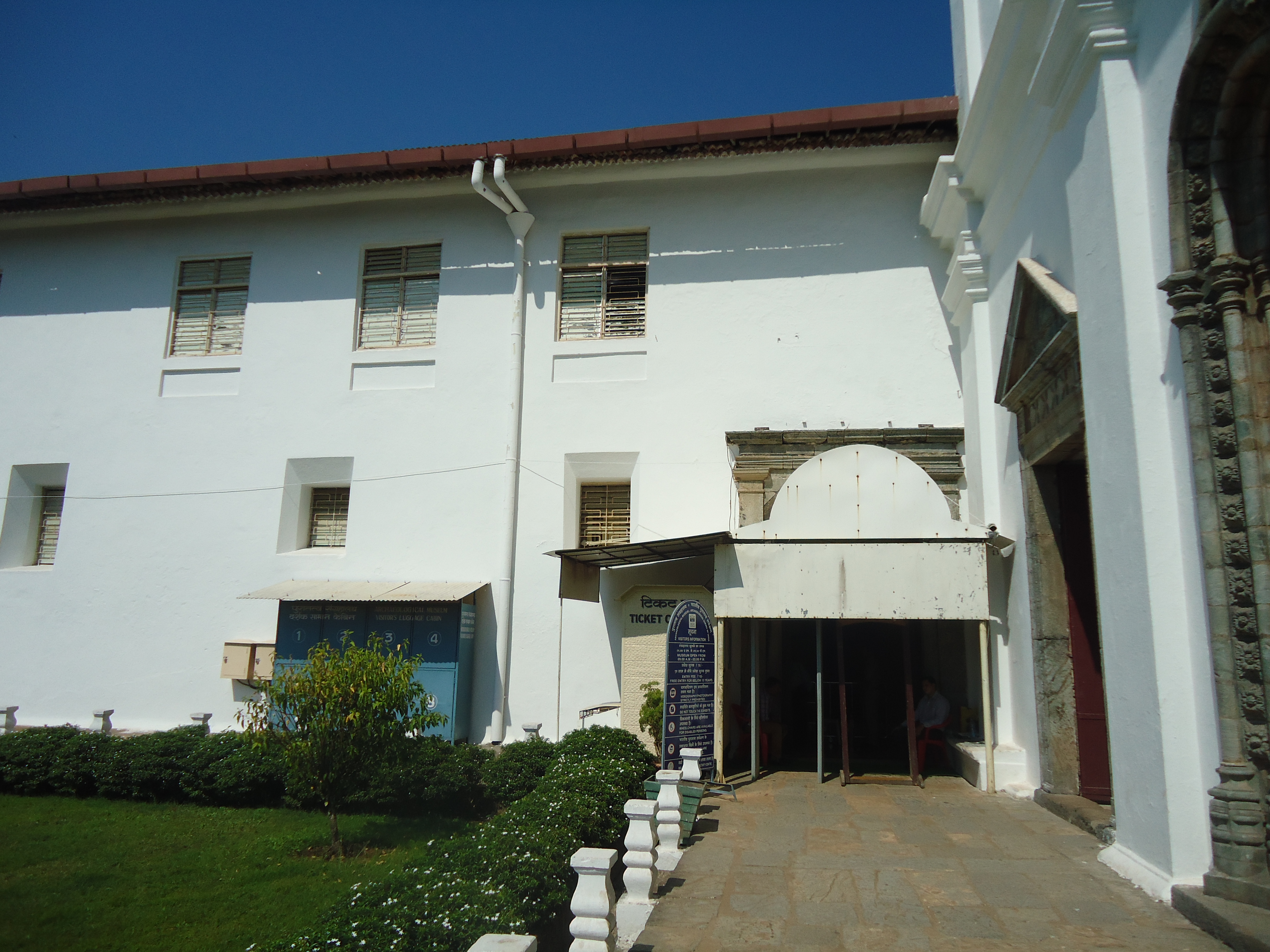
Archaeological Museum Entrance Goa

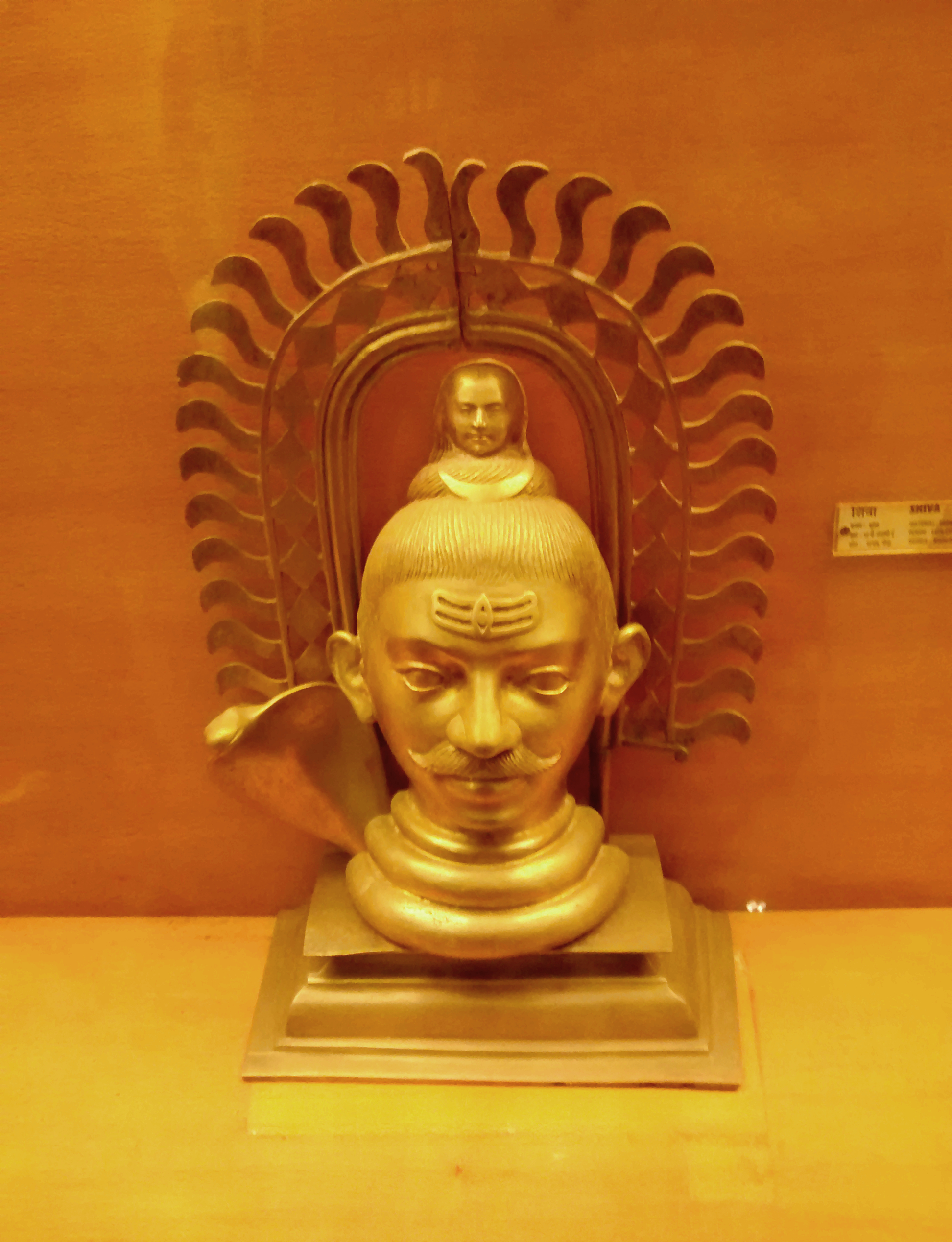
Siva With Moustache From Archaeological Museum GOA
