= Silva Porto (explorer) =

Portuguese explorer (1817–1890)

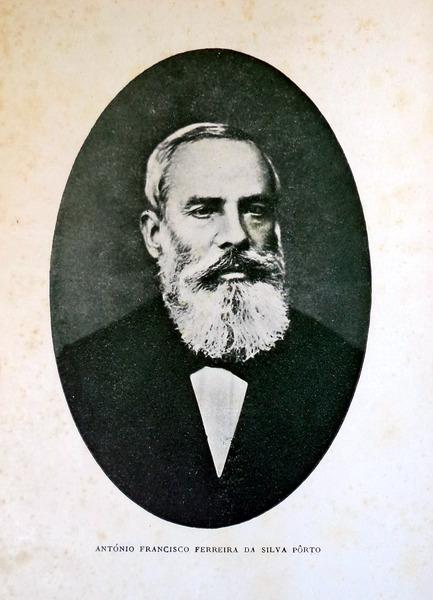
- Born: António Francisco Ferreira da Silva Porto; 24 August 1817; Porto, Kingdom of Portugal
- Died: 2 April 1890 (aged 72); Silva Porto, Portuguese Angola
- Occupations: Explorer, trader

António Francisco Ferreira da Silva Porto (24 August 1817 – 2 April 1890) was a Portuguese trader and explorer in Angola, in the Portuguese West Africa.

== Biography ==
Silva Porto was born to a poor family in Porto in continental Portugal; he was the son of humble parents, but whose father distinguished himself in battles against the French during their invasion in 1810. Instead of following his father into the military, the intelligent and ambitious boy looked to economic possibilities farther afield.

Brazil was an obvious possibility, owing to the success of many emigrants; at the age of twelve, with his father's blessing, he emigrated to the Brazilian capital of Rio de Janeiro on board the brig Rio Ave. After working for a while for a merchant he became indignant with his remuneration and quit, taking several itinerant jobs. At 18 years of age he landed in Bahia, where he made a point of announcing to the newspaper Correio Mercantil his new name, in order to remove any confusion with another António Ferreira da Silva. He did this to pay homage to his hometown as well. In Bahia he continued to work as a sales clerk for a coffee merchant but continued to be exploited by his boss and frustrated by the "despotism of proprietors without scruples".

=== West African merchant ===
One day, at the Port of Bahia, he boarded a ship to Luanda, "without even knowing where Angola was" as he would state later in life. However, initially, Luanda did not fascinate him much, and after a short time, he returned to Bahia where the political climate was heating up. During the "Sabino Revolt", an autonomist uprising in the State of Bahia that occurred between 6 November 1837 and 16 March 1838, Silva Porto understood that this political instability would hamper business prospects, and decided to return to Angola, where he was employed in a local tavern. Slowly, he became captivated with the interior of the African continent, and with his first salaries, he bought handicrafts and linens. Once he was confident of the quantity of mercantile goods in his possession, he quit his job and began his 50-year career as a merchant in the interior. He was only 22 years old. This was a difficult adventure: many of the caravans that left the Benguela coast for Lui, Luanda and Katanga risked robbery, pillaging and negotiating styles of the local chiefs. There was always risk of wandering into tribal conflicts. Silva Porto developed many friendships in the interior with tribesmen and quickly adapted to the conditions in Africa, adapting indigenous agricultural techniques and married a prominent black woman from the Bié kingdom of the Ovimbundu people, fathering several children with her.

By 1838, he had opened a shop in the interior of Luanda. Then by 1845, he descended to Benguela, establishing a route for his business along the road to Lui, by way of Lutembo and the upper Zambezi. He eventually established his headquarters in Belmonte, beginning his exploration of the region of Barotseland. His shop was a center of intense activity and commerce; he sold his textiles, small porcelain objects and explosives while purchasing and trading ivory, honey and rubber from the interior, all of which he meticulously recorded in his journals. These tomes (14 volumes in all) contained varied descriptions of geography, ethnography and anthropology of his region of Africa, which his old friend Luciano Cordeiro referred to as a "conversation on paper". Cordeiro would add, "with his tight and tortuous writing, which reminds me of zigzags across the mountain forests, in his at times, almost-Creole language owing to his isolation in the wilderness, in which he passed many hours writing silently". Eventually, Silva Porto's journals were published in the "Annals of the Ultramarine Counsel".

Silva Porto would once affirm, "If my work was what it was, there would be much published, and probably in many languages". In 1848, he was appointed interim Captain-major of Bié. He set out to quiet relations between the indigenous and Europeans; he met with the colonial Europeans to unite them and to persuade the local chief, Lhiumbulla, to stop detaining colonists (a fact that merchant Europeans continued to do for petty reasons). However, his attempts were an impossibility when the chief died, forcing Silva Porto to ask the colonial administration for a military force to protect Portuguese interests. After 1854 his activity was incessant, and by 1869 he had made six voyages to Lui and three to Benguela, where he would purchase the local shop Bemposta and remained sedentary, until 1879 when he returned to Belmonte. By 62 years of age, he was once again crossing Western Africa: he traveled to Moio (Kuba) in 1880 and 1882, to Lui (Barotseland) in 1883, and then to Benguela in 1882 and 1884. His activities were interrupted by a return trip to Lisbon for eye surgery during the winter and spring of 1885. When he returned he continued to trek his products across the interior, this time to Calunda and Benguela (by the end of 1887). When in Belmonte he helped the local mission, providing from his own money for school supplies, food and clothing for their children and remuneration for the teacher.

On 5 March 1889, he was substituted by Justino Teixeira da Silva as Captain-major of Bié, but continued to receive his 100,000 reis per month and the associated honors. The value of the 100$000 he earned was 20 gold 5$000 coins. These Portuguese gold coins had the same purity of 91.7% of the English Sovereign gold coins, but were 10.8% heavier. They were therefore worth 1 Pound, 2 Shillings and 2 pence each. In pure gold, he therefore earned 5.22 troy ounces of gold per month. At the recent gold price of $1500 per ounce, that would be roughly equivalent to US$7,828 per month in today's money.

=== Explorer ===
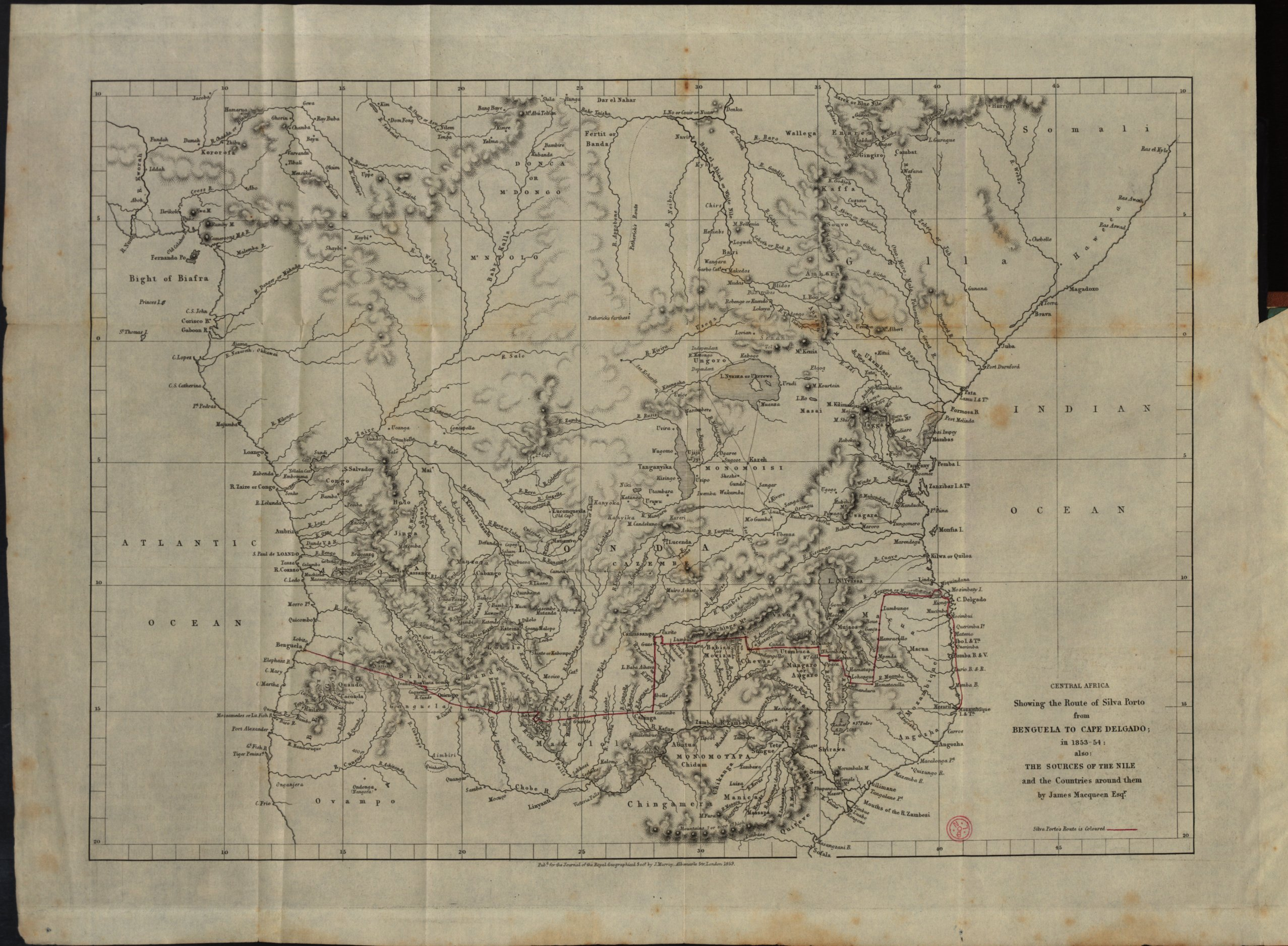
Map showing the route of Silva Porto from Benguela to Cape Delgado.

Around 1850, Portuguese exploration of Africa expanded, but Silva Porto's request for a military occupation force was never heard: at that time, Portugal was only interested in developing and colonizing the coast. In Belmonte, the most eastern Portuguese vanguard, Silva Porto experimented with exploring areas of the interior. He was a self-styled diplomat between the Portuguese colonists and the native tribes of the Ovimbundu, as well as a merchant and explorer. He frequently crossed the interior in caravans selling goods, as well as participating in field projects to document the ethnography and geography of the interior of the Portuguese West Africa. For many years, Silva Porto was the only white man that natives in Portuguese West Africa would see; he established himself in Bié and established a local business to serve the locals, settlers and support Portuguese forces.

In addition, he presented his services to David Livingstone, Henry Morton Stanley, Hermenegildo Capelo, Roberto Ivens and Alexandre de Serpa Pinto by relating his knowledge of native customs and identifying local indigenous which he had established good relations. Supposedly, Livingstone was unimpressed with the Portuguese settler, referring to him as a "vulgar negrito" when he arrived in the lands of the Upper Zambezi. At one point, Silva Porto housed the explorer, David Livingstone, and he helped Livingstone find an overland route between Luanda and certain places in the Angolan interior. Neither one of them seemed to like the other. Further, in his journals, he referred to the two Portuguese that he encountered (Silva Porto and Caetano Ferreira) as "mulattoes or uncivilized black savages", omitting the fact that Silva Porto had helped and supplied him with valuable information, and accused Silva Porto of being nothing more than an ordinary slave trader.

In 1889, after a visit to another village, Silva Porto returned to Belmonte to find his home burned-down. He wrote his friend Luciano Cordeiro, "I am an invalid and poor. I have no bread and look to the supreme consolation...to die in the Fatherland". In 1877, the Geographic Society had made an appeal to an entitlement for the merchant/explorer (specifically a pension), in order to support his desire to return to Portugal, where he could "die in the Fatherland which he had honorably and dedicatedly served".

=== Death ===
However, the 1890 British Ultimatum and the loss of the confidence brought on by chief Dunduna would drive him into despair. Paiva Couceiro arrived in the area of Teixeira da Silva around January 1890, with a contingent of 40 Mozambican soldiers, armed with Snider-Enfield breech-loading rifles, which worried the chief of Bié. Fearing that the Portuguese were there to construct a fort and occupy his lands, the chief was convinced by Silva Porto that the troops were only passing through the area on the way to Barotseland, and that they would not remain there for long. Nevertheless, Paiva Couceiro remained in the area until April, at which the chief (encouraged by threats to the Portuguese by the English) decided to send an ultimatum to the Captain-major in Teixeira da Silva: Couceiro and his troops should leave Bié by the morning of the following day. Indignant about the chief's demands, he sent Silva Porto to the village to negotiate an understanding. Believing he had some influence with the chief, he attempted to resolve the tensions, but was disappointed to realize he had little power: he returned despondent, likely learning that the British Ultimatum had reduced Portuguese influence. During Silva Porto's confrontation with Dunduna, the chief even tugged on his white beard; Dunduna was indignant over not being advised of the Paiva Couceiro's intentions and affirmed that Silva Porto was without character and insulted that he should wear beard, a symbol to him of respect.

Returning to Teixeira da Silva, he asked about the certainty of the Ultimatum, which irritated Paiva Couceiro. But later, in Belmonte, Silva Porto was in good spirits, although Paiva Couceiro did notice that his compound had barrels of gunpowder (which he, laughing, brushed off as full of sand). On April 1, 1890, the explorer wrapped himself in a Portuguese flag, lay down on a dozen kegs of gunpowder, and lit a fuse. He did not die immediately, but the burns from the self-inflicted injury killed him the next day. He was seventy-two.

== Honours ==
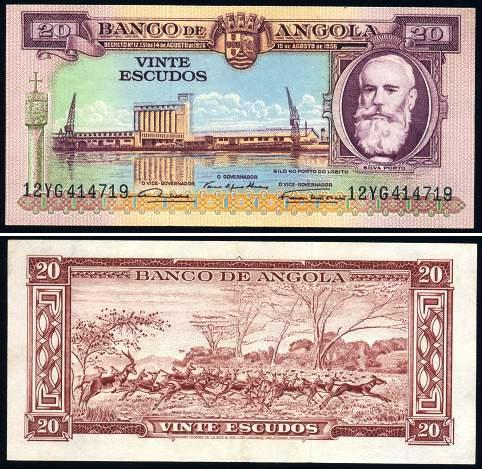
Angolan escudo note depicting António Silva Porto.

The town of Kuito, founded by the Portuguese and named Belmonte at that time, was renamed Silva Porto. In 1962–63, the Angolan Yearbook, which glorified its original colonizer, referred to the town as follows:

"The city of Silva Porto has a graceful aspect and the roads well marked and for the most part recently asphalted, it is electrified and watered, with a radio station and swimming pools for water sports. In the city there was recently erected a bronze statue, with 3.6 meter height, in honor if this great Portuguese...there are 2300 Europeans, 1900 mestiços and less than 400,000 natives".

The name remained until Angola's independence in 1975. Today its importance has been bypassed, and the population was diminished substantially.
He was also portrayed in the 20 Angolan escudo banknote issued in 1956.

== See also ==
- Kuito (formerly Silva Porto)
- Portuguese conquest of Viye
