= Europa Coins 2011 =

The 2011 theme for the Europa coin programme is European Explorers. The subject must have been a European or to have conducted exploration on behalf of a European nation. 10 European countries are participating:

Country	Person	Face Value	Issue date
Austria	Nikolaus Joseph von Jacquin	€20	23 February 2011
Belgium	Auguste Piccard	€10/50	(Unknown)
Finland	Pehr Kalm	€10	28 January 2011
France	Jacques Cartier	€10/50/200/500/1000	(Unknown)
Ireland	St. Brendan, the Navigator	€10	15 February 2011
Italy	Amerigo Vespucci	€10	(Unknown)
Malta	The Phoenicians in Malta	€10/50	5 April 2011
Portugal	Hermenegildo Capelo and Roberto Ivens	€2.50	20 April 2011
San Marino	Antonio and Roberto Pazzaglia	€5	(Unknown)
Spain	Francisco de Orellana	€10/200	(Unknown)

== See also ==
- Eurosystem
- Euro
- Euro gold and silver commemorative coins
