= João Carlos de Brito Capelo =

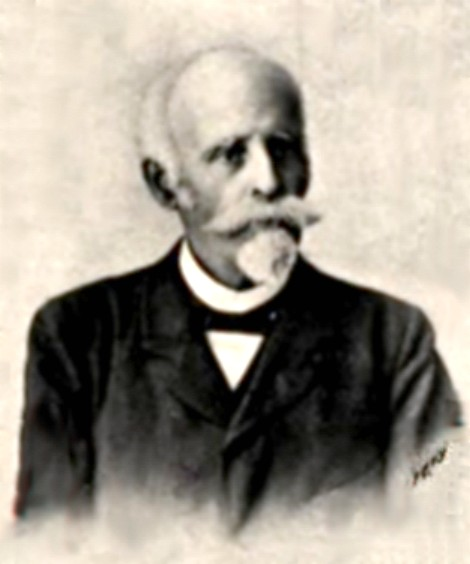
- Born: 8 March 1831; Lisbon, Portugal
- Died: 2 May 1901 (aged 70) Lisbon, Portugal
- Allegiance: Kingdom of Portugal
- Branch: Portuguese Navy
- Service years: 1845–1900
- Rank: Rear Admiral (Contra-Almirante)
- Commands: Observatório Meteorológico do Infante D. Luís
- Conflicts: —
- Awards: Knight of the Order of Saint James of the Sword; Knight of the Military Order of Aviz

João Carlos de Brito Capelo (8 March 1831 – 2 May 1901) was a Portuguese naval officer, hydrographer, and pioneering meteorologist. He is remembered as a founding figure in Portuguese geophysical sciences, particularly meteorology, magnetism, and solar photography.

== Early life and naval career ==
Brito Capelo was born in Lisbon into a prominent scientific and naval family. His father, Major Félix António de Gomes Capelo, was the Governor of the Castle of Palmela. Among his siblings were notable figures in Portuguese science and exploration: Hermenegildo Capelo (1841–1917), a naval officer and explorer known for his trans-African expeditions; Félix António de Brito Capelo (1828–1879), a biologist and oceanographer who pioneered studies on fish and spiders, discovering several new species; and Guilherme Augusto de Brito Capelo (1839–1926), a scientist and Vice-Admiral in the Portuguese Navy who also held colonial administrative roles.

He joined the Portuguese Navy in 1845 at the age of 14, progressing through the ranks to reach Rear Admiral in 1890. He served aboard several ships, including missions to Macau, Angola, and India, and was also assigned to teaching and scientific posts within the Navy.

== Work in meteorology and geophysics ==
From 1855, Brito Capelo became associated with the nascent meteorological observatory at the Lisbon Polytechnic School, later renamed the Observatório Meteorológico do Infante D. Luís (OMIDL), which he directed from 1875 to 1900. Under his leadership, Portugal developed a national and colonial network of meteorological stations, including those in Luanda (later named Observatório João Capelo), Serra do Pilar, Serra da Estrela, and Goa.

He was also responsible for placing storm warning systems along the Portuguese coast and implemented photographic and magnetic observation techniques in meteorology.

== Scientific contributions and inventions ==
Brito Capelo published extensively on atmospheric pressure, ocean currents, and magnetic declination. Notable works include Cartas dos Ventos e Correntes do Golfo da Guiné (1859) and Desvio da Agulha Magnética a Bordo (1867).

He invented several instruments such as the *croniogoniómetro*, used for determining the hour angle and position of celestial bodies at sea.

He was active in the international scientific community, representing Portugal at meteorological congresses in London, Rome, Paris, and Bern, and was a member of the International Meteorological Commission from 1879 until his death.

He was also a founding member of the Lisbon Geographical Society (Sociedade de Geografia de Lisboa), as well as a member of the Naval Club and the Royal Academy of Sciences from 1872.

== Legacy and honors ==
For his contributions, Brito Capelo was made a Knight of the Order of Saint James of the Sword in 1869 and of the Military Order of Aviz in 1874. His solar photographs were exhibited at international expositions in Vienna (1873) and Paris (1878) and cited in the works of Angelo Secchi.

He retired in 1900 and died in Lisbon in 1901. His scientific legacy endures in the fields of meteorology and navigation.

== Selected works ==
- Cartas dos Ventos e Correntes do Golfo da Guiné (1859)
- Desvio da Agulha Magnética a Bordo (1867)
- Cyclone dos Açores (1893)
- Barometrical Depressions between the Azores and the Continent of Europe (1883)

== See also ==
- Hermenegildo Capelo

== Sources ==
- Fernandes, André Pires (2017). Biografia de João Carlos de Brito Capelo (Mestrado em Ciências Militares Navais). Alfeite: Escola Naval.
- "Á la mémoire du Vice-Amiral João Carlos de Brito Capelo. - Lisbonne : Observatoire Infante D. Luiz, 1901".
- António Costa Canas e Paulo Rafael da Silva, “O desenvolvimento das ciências geofísicas no século XIX em Portugal. Contribuição de Brito Capelo”, Actas do Colóquio Vasco da Gama, os Oceanos e o Futuro, Escola Naval, 23 a 27 de novembro de 1998, [Alfeite], Escola Naval.
