= Silva Porto =

Silva Porto may refer to:

- Silva Porto (explorer) (1817-1890), António Francisco Ferreira da Silva Porto, Portuguese trader and explorer
- Silva Porto (painter) (1850-1893), António Carvalho da Silva, Portuguese naturalist painter
- The Angolan town of Kuito, known as Silva Porto before 1975
