= Fernando de Magalhães e Menezes =

Portugal military officer

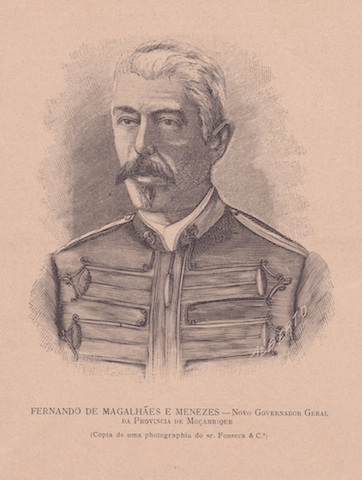

Colonial governor of Cape Verde
- In office 1893–1894
- Preceded by: José Guedes Brandão de Melo
- Succeeded by: José Guedes Brandão de Melo

Personal details
- Born: 13 September 1840 Freixo de Baixo, Amarante
- Died: September 9, 1899 (aged 58) Torre de Faia, Freixo de Baixo, Amarante

Fernando de Magalhães e Menezes. ComTE, CvC, CvA, OSE (30 October 1846 – 23 September 1919) was a Portuguese colonial administrator and a military officer. He was also Chief of Staff during the 31 January 1891 revolt.

== Biography ==
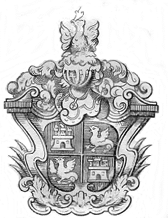
Coat of Arms of Vilas Boas

He was born in Freixo de Baixo in Amarante. He was son of the heir José de Magalhães e Meneses de Vilas-Boas e Sampaio Barbosa, head of the Vilas Boas family of Barcelos and Magalhães e Meneses of Amarante. His father was bestowed by Miguel I, exiled with the title Count of Alvelos, which Fernando de Magalhães e Menezes did not use, and up to the death of his brother Francisco, he appointed the house of D. Miguel, which for the reason claimed the title for his brother that served under the constitutional monarchy. Fernando de Magalhães was the last senior of the links to the Magalhães e Meneses, noble family of Amarante, in which its goods were brought for the payments. He was the owner of Paço dos Vilas Boas in Barcelos.

=== Military career ===
He took place on June 19, 1862 and enlisted into the 9th Hunter Battalion. Later in September, he got his license to attend the University of Coimbra and he got his bachelor's degree in mathematics. In 1863, he became an official aspirer and in the following year, in September 1864, he attended the Military School in Lisbon. He attended a course at Estado Maior, where he was promoted to second lieu-tenant on 19 April 1865 and received the First Award from the Military School for the 1864-65 school year. He finished a course a year later and was promoted to a lieutenant on 3 January 1866. He became aide-de-camp of the 3rd State Major Division on 22 April 1868, he was promoted to tenant on 21 January 1868. On 21 April 1869, he went to a degree of a captain, transfedder to become the Chief of Staff of the 5th Division on 3 October 1890. Two years before, he lost his father, he required inactivity for some time, and dealt with his family business. He returned to his service on 7 November 1871, where he promoted to brigadier major of the Instruction and Manoeuvre Brigade later on the 24th of the same month.

=== 31 January Republican Revolution ===
On March 5, 1890, he became lieutenant colonel, took part as Chief of Staff in Porto, not long after a revolt would start. Later in that month, he was awarded the degree of commander of the Order of the Tower and Sword. He was no longer chief of staff of Porto in 1892.

=== Colonial administration ===
He was promoted to a colonel on July 30, 1893 and he became Governor General of the colony of Cape Verde, a week later, he became brigadier general. Later, he left the archipelago. He was later governor of the Province of Mozambique, where he faced problems which resulted in the campaigns against the Gungunhana in which he chose to return to Portugal. In Africa, his children Fernando and José were there. He was awarded with the degree of a Knight of the Order of Christ and the Order of Avis.

== Descendants ==
He was married to Adelaide Hermínia Teixeira de Moura, daughter and heiress of Guilherme Júlio Teixeira de Moura, doctor of Escola Médico-Cirúrgica (Medical-Surgical School) of Porto, 1st Baron of Vilalva Guimarães. they were parents of Fernando de Magalhães e Menezes, 1.º Count of Vilas Boas; José de Magalhães e Menezes, 2nd Baron of Vilalva Guimarães; Fernanda, wife of Fernando van Zeller, Baron of Vilar; Maria do Carmo, married to his cousin in law Francisco, Count of Alvelos; Adelaide, Lady of Torre da Faia, in Amarante.

== See also ==
- List of colonial governors of Cape Verde

Preceded by José Guedes Brandão de Melo	Colonial governor of Cape Verde; 1893-1894	Succeeded by José Guedes Brandão de Melo
