= Alexandre de Serpa Pinto =

Portuguese explorer and soldier (1846–1900)

Alexandre Alberto de Serpa Pinto
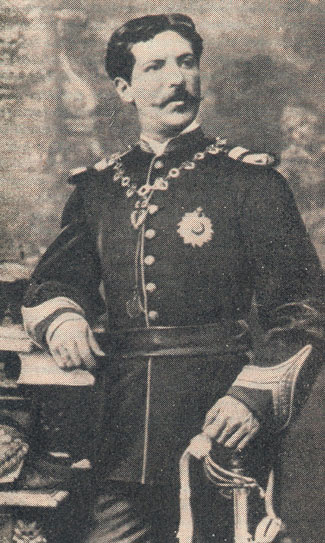
- Born: 20 April 1846; Cinfães, Kingdom of Portugal
- Died: 28 December 1900 (aged 54)
- Education: Colégio Militar
- Occupations: Soldier, explorer, colonial administrator
- Office: Colonial governor of Cape Verde
- Term: 20 January 1894 – 17 January 1898
- Predecessor: José Guedes Brandão de Melo
- Successor: João Cesário de Lacerda
- Military career
- Allegiance: Kingdom of Portugal
- Branch: Portuguese Army
- Service years: 1864 – 1890
- Rank: Colonel

Alexandre Alberto da Rocha de Serpa Pinto, Viscount of Serpa Pinto (aka Serpa Pinto; 20 April 1846 – 28 December 1900) was a Portuguese explorer of southern Africa and a colonial administrator.

== Early life ==
Serpa Pinto was born at the Quinta das Poldras (Tendais) in Cinfães, a Portuguese village on the river Douro. He joined Colégio Militar at age 10. There he became the first student Battalion Commander in 1864, when he joined the Portuguese army and was sent to Portuguese Mozambique. In 1869 he took part in suppressing tribes in revolt around the lower Zambezi.

== Exploration ==
Also in 1869, Pinto went to eastern Africa on an exploration of the Zambezi River. Eight years later he led an expedition from Benguela, Portuguese Angola, into the basins of the Congo and Zambezi rivers. The town of Menongue was named Serpa Pinto, after him, up to 1975.

In 1877, he and Lieutenant Commander Capelo and Lieutenant Ivens, both of the Portuguese navy, were sent to explore the southern African interior. All three had African experience and seemed to be the right age and temperament for the work. They left Benguela in November. Soon after their departure, however, they parted company at Bié, Capello and Ivens turning northward whilst Serpa Pinto continued eastward, gradually shifting his course to the south. He crossed the Cuando (Kwando) river in June 1878 and in August reached Lealui, the Barotse capital on the Zambezi. There he received assistance from the missionary François Coillard, enabling him to continue his journey along the Zambezi to the Victoria Falls. He then turned south and arrived at Pretoria in northern South Africa on 12 February 1879. Capelo and Ivens emerged at Dondo, on the Cuanza River in northern Angola. Serpa Pinto was the fourth explorer to cross Africa from west to east, and the first to lay down a reasonably accurate route between Bié (in present-day Angola) and Lealui. In 1881 the Royal Geographical Society awarded him their Founder's Medal, "for his journey across Africa ... during which he explored five hundred miles of new country".

In 1881 Serpa Pinto published his 2-volume Como eu atravessei a África, translated by Alfred Elwes and published in English as How I crossed Africa. In the same year French, German and Swedish translations were also published.

== Nyasa Region ==
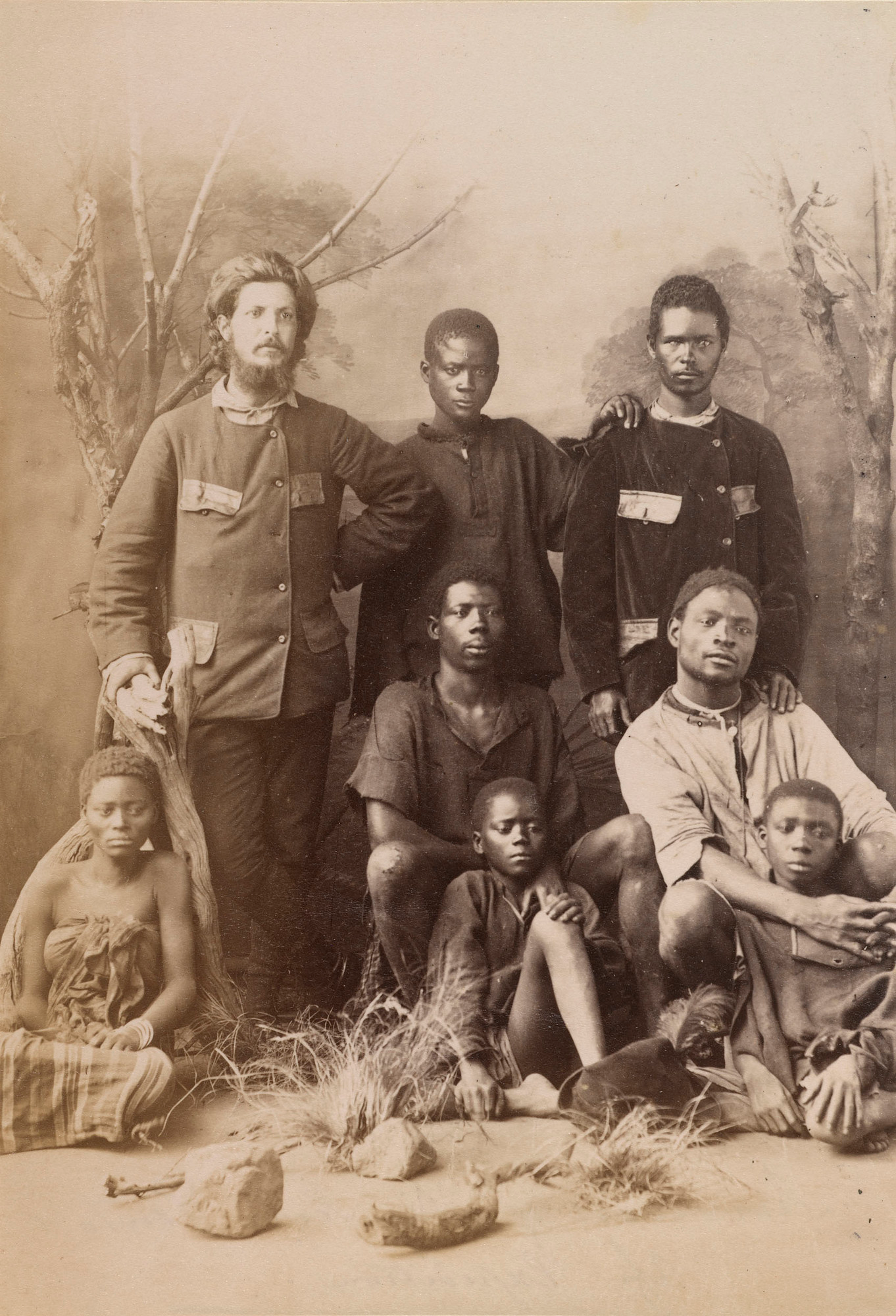
Alexandre de Serpa Pinto (standing, left) with the survivors of his expedition from Luanda to Natal, c. 1879

In 1879 the Portuguese government formally claimed the area south and east of the Ruo River (which currently forms the southeastern border of Malawi), and in 1882 occupied the lower Shire River valley as far as the Ruo. The Portuguese then attempted to negotiate British acceptance of their territorial claims, but the convening of the Berlin Conference (1884) ended these discussions. In 1884, Serpa Pinto was appointed as Portuguese consul in Zanzibar, and given the mission of exploring and re-mapping the region between Lake Nyasa and the coast from the Zambezi to the Rovuma River and securing the allegiance of the chiefs in that area. In 1885, Serpa Pinto undertook an expedition in 1885 with Lieutenant Augusto Cardoso as his second-in-command. Serpa Pinto fell seriously ill and was carried to the coast, where he eventually recovered. Cardoso his twenty-five-year-old lieutenant, continued the exploration, visiting Lake Nyasa and the Shire Highlands, but failed to make any treaties of protection with the Yao chiefs in territories west of the lake Malawi.

Britain declined to accept the Portuguese claim that the Shire Highlands should be considered part of Portuguese East Africa, as it was not under their effective occupation. In order to prevent Portuguese occupation, the British government sent Henry Hamilton Johnston as British consul to Mozambique and the Interior, with instructions to report on the extent of Portuguese rule in the Zambezi and Shire valleys and the vicinity, and to make conditional treaties with local rulers beyond Portuguese jurisdiction, to prevent them accepting protection from Portugal. In 1888, the Portuguese government instructed its representatives in Portuguese East Africa to attempt to make treaties of protection with the Yao chiefs southeast of Lake Malawi and in the Shire Highlands and an expedition organised under Antonio Cardoso, a former governor of Quelimane, set off in November 1888 for the lake. Rather later, a second expedition led by Serpa Pinto, who had been appointed governor of Mozambique, moved up the Shire valley. Between them, these two expedition made over 20 treaties with chiefs in what is now Malawi. Serpa Pinto met Johnston in August 1889 east of the Ruo, when Johnston advised him not to cross the river into the Shire Highlands. Although Serpa Pinto had previously acted with caution, he crossed the Ruo to Chiromo, now in Malawi in September 1889. Following minor clashes with Serpa Pinto's force, Johnston's deputy, John Buchanan, declared a British protectorate over the Shire Highlands, despite contrary instructions, although this was later endorsed by the Foreign Office.

== Later life ==
Shortly after this clash with Britain, Serpa Pinto returned to Portugal where he was promoted to the rank of colonel. He was governor general of Cape Verde from 20 January 1894 until 17 January 1898. Serpa Pinto died in Lisbon on 28 December 1900 at the age of 54. His earthly remains were laid to rest in the family grave of António Gomes dos Santos and Francisco de Souza Santos Moreira and their families in the Cemitério dos Prazeres in Lisbon.

== Honours ==
Recognition and honours for his services were not wanting. In Portugal, he was made comendador of the orders of knighthood: Ordem da Torre e Espada, the Ordem Sao Bento de Aviz, and the Ordem de Sao Tiago da Espada; in France the Cross of the Ordre National de la Légion d'Honneur was conferred on him; in Brazil he was made knight of the Ordem da Rosa; and in Turkey he was honoured with the Great Cross of the Order of the Medejidie. He received honorary membership and awards from various scientific societies, including membership of the French Académie des Sciences' Astronomy division, and the "Founders' Medal" of the Royal Geographical Society of London. On 24 January 1899 he was honoured by King Carlos I (1863–1908) with the noble title of Viscount.

To honour and remember him, streets and squares in many Portuguese towns and cities were named after him, for example the Rua Serpa Pinto in Lisbon, Porto, Tomar, Évora, Braganca, Torres Vedras, Rio Maior and Cinfães, to mention only a few. In Angola, the town of Serpa Pinto (now Menongue), main seat of the province Cuando-Cubango, was named after him. His name was even given to two ships, and as trade name for products like cigars and biscuits. During the 125th commemoration of the founding of the Sociedade de Geografia de Lisboa, two stamps were issued with a portrait of Serpa Pinto in a prominent place, while a portrait of him also appears on a banknote from Angola. In Cinfães the Serpa Pinto Museum was opened on 20 April 2000, housing a small exhibit dedicated to this famous son of the area. On a small square in front of the Museum is a bust of Serpa Pinto. The house where Serpa Pinto's parents lived in Porto Antigo, Cinfães, on the banks of the Rio Bastanéa (Bestança River), where it flows into the Rio Douro (Douro River), has been transformed into the luxurious Estalagem Porto Antigo and the conference hall there is named after Serpa Pinto. Also the original dwelling and out-houses still stand, but in a neglected state.

He was also portrayed in the 100 Angolan escudo banknote issued in 1956.

In Cinfães was founded the Associação Cultural Serpa Pinto (ACSP), in 2007 published in Diário da República, 2ª. série – Nº. 38 – 22 de Fevereiro de 2008, page 7339. The address is Lugar de Vila Viçosa, Cx Postal 327 4690-906 Cinfães, Portugal. The idea of the Association is to develop cultural, social, scientific, technological and artistic activities in Cinfães, in Portugal, in the C.P.L.P. (Community of Portuguese Language Countries) and in all countries interested in the historical course, life and work General Alexandre Alberto da Rocha Serpa Pinto but also contribute to the enrichment, protection and conservation of General Alexandre Alberto da Rocha Serpa Pinto's estate, encourage teaching and research in the areas of Natural Sciences, Anthropology, History and Sociology and to promote culture, defense and conservation of the historical, artistic and cultural heritage of Cinfães, Portugal and C.P.L.P.. It have also an educational function by bringing into being a library, conference facilities and exhibition locale. Furthermore, the Association promote the study the life and work of Serpa Pinto and the era in which he lived in a scientific and inter-disciplinary manner.

== Notes ==
Preceded by José Guedes Brandão de Melo	Colonial governor of Cape Verde; 1894-1898	Succeeded by João Cesário de Lacerda
