= Lubuya =

Conservation status
- Least Concern (IUCN 3.1)

Scientific classification
- Kingdom: Animalia
- Phylum: Chordata
- Class: Reptilia
- Order: Squamata
- Family: Scincidae
- Genus: Lubuya; Horton, 1972
- Species: L. ivensii

Binomial name
- Lubuya ivensii (Bocage, 1879)

Synonyms
- Euprepes ivensii Bocage, 1879; Mabuia ivensii — Boulenger, 1887; Lygosoma ivensii — Bocage, 1895; Mabuya ivensii — Manaças, 1963; Lubuya ivensii — Horton, 1972; Euprepis ivensii — Mausfeld et al., 2002; Trachylepis ivensii — Bauer, 2003; Lubuya ivensii — Conradie et al., 2016

Genus of lizards

Lubuya is a genus of skinks, lizards in the family Scincidae. The genus contains one species, Lubuya ivensii, known commonly as Ivens' skink, Ivens's skink, Ivens's water skink, or the meadow skink, which is native to Southern Africa.

== Etymology ==
The specific name, ivensii, is in honor of Portuguese explorer Roberto Ivens.

== Geographic range ==
L. ivensii is found in Angola, southern Democratic Republic of Congo, and northwestern Zambia.

== Reproduction ==
L. ivensii is viviparous.
