= Augusto César Cardoso de Carvalho =

Portuguese colonial administrator and general of the Portuguese Army

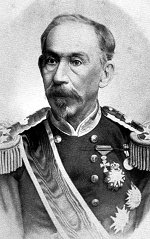

Colonial governor of Portuguese Timor
- In office 1880–1881
- Preceded by: Hugo Goodair de Lacerda Castelo Branco
- Succeeded by: Bento da França Pinto de Oliveira

Colonial governor of Portuguese India
- In office 16 December 1886 – 27 April 1889
- Preceded by: Francisco Joaquim Ferreira do Amaral
- Succeeded by: Vasco Guedes de Carvalho e Meneses

Colonial governor of Cape Verde
- In office 12 June 1889 – 4 February 1890
- Preceded by: João Cesário de Lacerda
- Succeeded by: José Guedes Brandão de Melo

Personal details
- Born: 31 March 1836 Lisbon, Portugal
- Died: 3 February 1905 (aged 68) Lisbon

Augusto César Cardoso de Carvalho (31 March 1836 – 3 February 1905) was a Portuguese colonial administrator and a general of the Portuguese Army. He was governor of Portuguese Timor from 1880 to 1881, governor-general of Portuguese India from 16 December 1886 until 27 April 1889 and governor of Cape Verde from 12 June 1889 until 4 February 1890.

During his tenure as governor of Timor, in early 1881, the Timorese Kingdom of Cová submitted to Portuguese authority. During his administration in Portuguese India, the harbour of Mormugao and the railway line from there to the then-border with British India were opened.

== See also ==
- List of colonial governors of Cape Verde
- List of colonial governors of Portuguese Timor
- List of governors of Portuguese India

Preceded by Hugo Goodair de Lacerda Castelo Branco	Governor of Portuguese Timor; 1880-1881	Succeeded by Bento da França Pinto de Oliveira
Preceded by Francisco Joaquim Ferreira do Amaral	Colonial governor of Portuguese India; 1888-89	Succeeded by Vasco Guedes de Carvalho e Meneses
Preceded by João Cesário de Lacerda	Colonial governor of Cape Verde; 1889-90	Succeeded by José Guedes Brandão de Melo
