= Angolan angolar =

Currency of the former Portuguese colony of Angola from 1928 to 1958

The angolar (plural: angolares) was the currency of Portuguese Angola between 1928 and 1958. It was subdivided into 100 centavos or 20 macutas. Angolar is Portuguese for "of Angola".

== History ==
The angolar was introduced in 1928 to replace the escudo. Banknotes were exchanged at a rate of 1 angolar = 1.25 escudos. However, the exchange rate with the Portuguese escudo remained at par, indicating that the earlier Angolan banknotes were devalued as part of the reform, rather than the angolar actually having a new, higher value. Coins (all denominated in centavos and macutas) were unaffected by the reform. In 1958, the name of the currency was switched back to escudo after a period of time during which coins denominated in escudos had already begun to circulate.

== Coins ==
In addition to those coins already circulating (1, 2, 5, 10, 20 and 50 centavos), new 10, 20 and 50 centavo coins were issued between 1948 and 1950. The first escudo coins were issued dated 1952.

== Banknotes ==
In 1928, the Junta de Moeda introduced notes (dated 1926) in denominations of 1, 2 1/2, 5 and 10 angolares, whilst the Bank of Angola introduced 20, 50, 100 and 500 angolar notes dated 1927. In 1942, the Governo Geral took over the issuance of 1 and 2 1/2 angolar notes. 1000 angolar notes were added by the Bank of Angola in 1944, followed by 5 and 10 angolares in 1947.

Preceded by: Angolan escudo Reason: Counter measure of Alves Reis's scheme Ratio: 1 angolar = 1.25 escudos	Currency of Portuguese Angola; 1928 – 1958	Succeeded by: Angolan escudo Reason: unification of colonial Portuguese currencies Ratio: at par, 1 Angolan escudo = Portuguese escudo
