= Angolan real =

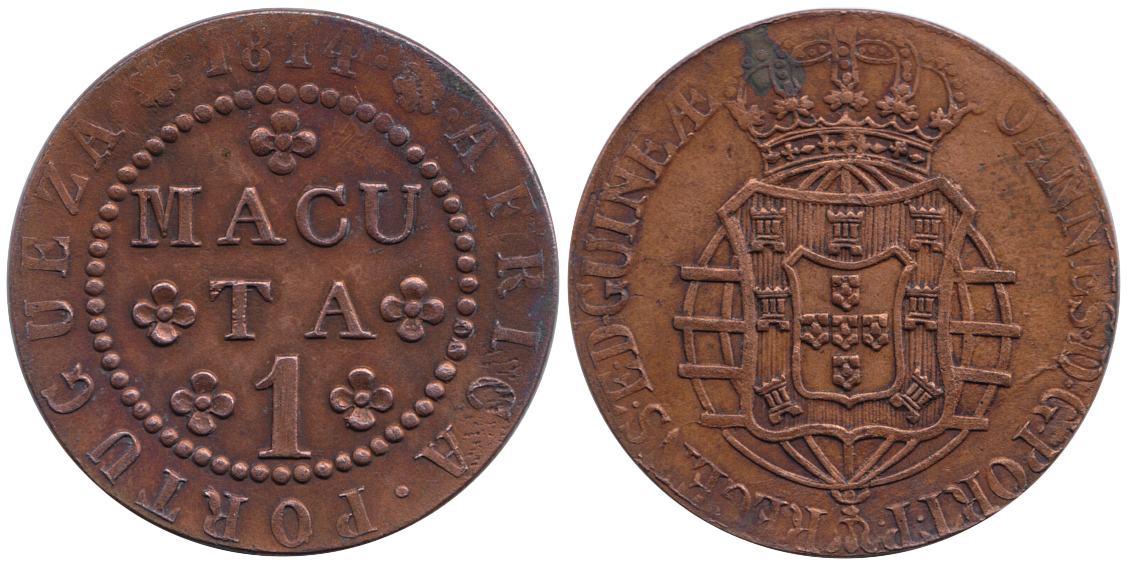
- 1 macuta, 1814, John VI

Unit
- Plural: réis

Denominations
- Superunit
- 50: macuta

Demographics
- User(s): Portuguese Angola

Issuance
- Central bank: Banco Nacional Ultramarino
- This infobox shows the latest status before this currency was rendered obsolete.

The real (plural réis) was the currency of Portuguese Angola until 1914. It was equal to the Portuguese real. No subdivisions existed, but some coins were issued denominated in macutas, worth 50 réis. The real was replaced by the escudo in 1914.

== Coins ==
In the mid-eighteenth century, copper coins were issued in denominations of 10, 20 and 40 réis, 1/4, 1/2 and 1 macuta, along with silver 2, 4, 6, 8, 10 and 12 macutas. From 1814, only copper 1/4, 1/2, 1 and 2 macutas were issued. However, after 1814, some copper coins were counterstamped with the coat of arms of Portugal to double their value. 10, 20 and 40 réis and 1/4, 1/2, 1 and 2 macuta coins were counterstamped to produce 20, 40 and 80 réis and 1/2, 1, 2 and 4 macuta coins. The last coins were issued in 1860.

== Banknotes ==
In 1861, the Junta da Fazenda Publica da Provincia d'Angola introduced notes in denominations of 1000, 2000, 5000 and 20,000 réis. 10,000 real notes followed in 1877, with notes issued until 1884. The Banco Nacional Ultramarino began issuing notes in 1865, with notes for 5000, 10,000 and 20,000 réis. In 1876, 1000 and 2500 real notes were added, followed by 2000 réis in 1877. In 1892, a shortage of small change lead to an emergency issue of 100, 200 and 500 real notes which circulated until 1905. 50,000 real notes were introduced in 1909.
