= Angolan kwanza =

Currency of Angola

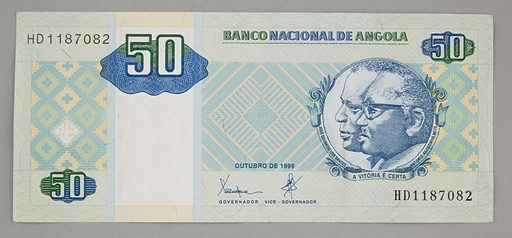
- 1999 bank note of 50 kwanzas

ISO 4217
- Code: AOA (numeric: 973) before 2000: AOK, AON, AOR
- Subunit: 0.01

Units of account
- Symbol: Kz
- Subunit
- 1/100: cêntimo

Denominations
- Banknotes: 200, 500, 1,000, 2,000, 5,000 kwanzas
- Coins
- Freq. used: 10, 20, 50, 100, 200 kwanzas
- Rarely used: 50 cêntimos, 1 and 5 kwanzas

Demographics
- Replaced: Angolan escudo
- User(s): Angola

Issuance
- Central bank: Banco Nacional de Angola
- Website: www.bna.ao
- Printer: Goznak
- Website: www.goznak.ru

Valuation
- Inflation: 10.81%
- Source: Banco Nacional de Angola, 2023.

The kwanza (sign: Kz; ISO 4217 code: AOA) is the currency of Angola. Four different currencies using the name kwanza have circulated since 1977. The currency derives its name from the Kwanza River (also spelled Cuanza, Coanza, Quanza).

== Overview ==
Start date	Finish date	ISO 4217	Currency unit	Subunit	Notes
1958	8 Jan 1977		Angolan escudo	100 centavos	
8 Jan 1977	24 Sep 1990	AOK	Kwanza	100 lwei	1 kwanza = 1 Angolan escudo
25 Sep 1990	30 Jun 1995	AON	Novo kwanza	none	1 novo kwanza = 1 kwanza
1 Jul 1995	30 Nov 1999	AOR	Kwanza reajustado	none	1 kwanza reajustado = 1000 novos kwanzas
1 Dec 1999	present	AOA	Kwanza	100 cêntimos	1 kwanza = 1,000,000 kwanzas reajustados

== First kwanza, AOK, 1977–1990 ==
The kwanza was introduced following Angolan independence. It replaced the escudo at par, which was then subdivided into 100 lwei. The 1977 kwanza's ISO 4217 code was AOK. Following a change in currency, a confiscation took place. Individuals could convert only up to 200,000 escudos for kwanzas, and corporations could convert only up to 1,500,000 escudos. This kwanza had a remarkably stable exchange rate of 29.918 kwanzas to the U.S. dollar for the entire 1977-1999 time period.

=== Coins ===
The first coins issued for the kwanza currency did not bear any date of issue, though all had the date of independence, "11 de Novembro de 1975", imprinted on them. Kwanza-based coins existed in denominations of 50 lwei, 1, 2, 5 and 10 kwanzas. 20 kwanza coins were added in 1978. The last date to appear on these coins was 1979.

First kwanza coins
Image	Value	Composition	Diameter	Weight	Thickness	Edge	Issued
	50 lwei	copper-nickel	16 mm	2 g	1.5 mm	Reeded	1977-1979
	1 kwanza	copper-nickel	20.9 mm	3.91 g	1.8 mm	Reeded	1977-1979
	2 kwanzas	copper-nickel	23.2 mm	5 g	1.82 mm	Reeded	1977
	5 kwanzas	copper-nickel	25.5 mm	7 g	2.05 mm	Reeded	1977
	10 kwanzas	copper-nickel	27.5 mm	7.7 g	2 mm	Reeded	1977-1978
	20 kwanzas	copper-nickel	29 mm	10 g	1.9 mm	Reeded	1978

=== Banknotes ===
On 8 January 1977, banknotes dated 11 DE NOVEMBRO DE 1975 were introduced by the Banco Nacional de Angola (National Bank of Angola) in denominations of 20, 50, 100, 500, and 1000 kwanzas. The 20 kwanza note was replaced by a coin in 1978.

== Novo kwanza, AON, 1990–1995 ==
In 1990, the novo kwanza was introduced, with the ISO 4217 code AON. Although it replaced the kwanza at par, Angolans could only exchange 5% of all old notes for new ones; they had to exchange the rest for government securities. This kwanza suffered from high inflation.

=== Coins ===
Novo kwanza coins
Image	Value	Composition	Diameter	Weight	Thickness	Edge	Issued
	50 kwanzas	copper	24 mm	5.5 g		Reeded	1991
	50 kwanzas	copper-plated steel	23.3 mm	5 g		Reeded	1992
	100 kwanzas	copper	26 mm	8 g	1.9 mm	Reeded	1991

=== Banknotes ===
The first banknotes issued in 1990 were overprints on earlier notes in denominations of 50 (report not confirmed), 500, 1000 and 5000 novos kwanzas (5000 novos kwanzas overprinted on 100 kwanzas). In 1991, the word novo was dropped from the issue of regular banknotes for 100, 500, 1000, 5000, 10,000, 50,000, 100,000 and 500,000 kwanzas.

== Kwanza reajustado, AOR, 1995–1999 ==
In 1995, the kwanza reajustado (plural kwanzas reajustados) replaced the previous kwanza at a rate of 1,000 to 1. It had the ISO 4217 code AOR. The inflation continued and no coins were issued.

=== Banknotes ===
Despite the exchange rate, such was the low value of the old kwanza that the smallest denomination of banknote issued was 1000 kwanzas reajustados. Other notes were 5,000, 10,000, 50,000, 100,000, 500,000, 1,000,000 and 5,000,000 kwanzas.

== Second kwanza, AOA, 1999– ==
In 1999, a second currency was introduced simply called the kwanza. It replaced the kwanza reajustado at a rate of 1,000,000 to 1. Unlike the first kwanza, this currency is subdivided into 100 cêntimos. The introduction of this currency saw the reintroduction of coins. Although it suffered early on from high inflation, its value became stable until 2016, when the currency started devaluing again. The currency suffered a devaluation of nearly 40% against the US dollar between May and June 2023 to a record low of 825 kwanzas to the US dollar.

=== Coins ===
==== First series ====
Coins
Value	Technical parameters			Description			Date of first minting
Value	Diameter	Mass	Composition	Edge	Obverse	Reverse	Date of first minting
10 cêntimos	15 mm	1.5 g	Copper-plated steel	Plain	State title, Coat of arms, year	Value	1999
50 cêntimos	18 mm	3 g	Copper-plated steel	Plain	State title, Coat of arms, year	Value	1999
1 kwanza	21 mm	4.5 g	Cupronickel	Reeded	State title, Coat of arms, year	Value	1999
2 kwanzas	22 mm	5 g	Cupronickel	Reeded	State title, Coat of arms, year	Value	1999
5 kwanzas	26 mm	7 g	Cupronickel	Reeded	State title, Coat of arms, year	Value	1999
For table standards, see the coin specification table.

Coins in 10 and 50 cêntimo denominations are no longer used, as the values are minuscule. Coins of this series lost their legal tender status on 1 January 2015.

==== Second series ====
Coins
Value	Technical parameters			Description			Date of first minting
Value	Diameter	Mass	Composition	Edge	Obverse	Reverse	Date of first minting
50 cêntimos	20.6 mm	3.8 g	Copper-nickel-plated steel	Plain	State title, Coat of arms, year	Value	2012
1 kwanza	22.1 mm	5.0 g	Brass-plated steel	Plain	State title, Coat of arms, year	Value	2012
5 kwanzas	25 mm	7.0 g	Bi-metallic nickel-brass centre in copper-nickel ring	Reeded	State title, Coat of arms, year	Value	2012
10 kwanzas	27 mm	8.0 g	Bi-metallic copper-nickel centre in nickel-brass ring	Reeded	State title, Coat of arms, year	Value	2012
20 kwanzas	28 mm	11.64 g	Bi-metallic steel centre in brass ring	Interrupted reeded	Rainha Njinga	Value	2014
50 kwanzas	26 mm	7.6 g	Copper-nickel-clad steel	Partially reeded	40 years of independence	Value	2015
100 kwanzas	26.5 mm	8.6 g	Brass-clad steel	Partially reeded	40 years of independence	Value	2015
200 kwanzas	25.5 mm	10.5 g	Copper-nickel-clad steel	Partially reeded	Peace and National Reconciliation	Value	2022
For table standards, see the coin specification table.

During 2012–14, new coins were introduced in denominations of 50 cêntimos, 1, 5, 10 and 20 kwanzas.

=== Banknotes ===
==== First Series ====
The banknotes are quite similar in design, with only different colours separating them.

Banknotes of the Angolan Kwanza (1999-2011 series)
Image		Value	Main Colour	Description			Date of	
Obverse	Reverse	Value	Main Colour	Obverse	Reverse	Watermark	printing	issue
		1 kwanza	Pink	Agostinho Neto and José Eduardo dos Santos	Women picking cotton	Sculpture	October 1999	1 December 1999
		5 kwanzas	Light green	Agostinho Neto and José Eduardo dos Santos	Serra da Leba	Sculpture	October 1999	1 December 1999
		10 kwanzas	Red	Agostinho Neto and José Eduardo dos Santos	2 antelopes	Sculpture	October 1999	1 December 1999
		50 kwanzas	Lime	Agostinho Neto and José Eduardo dos Santos	Off-shore oil rig	Sculpture	October 1999	1 December 1999
		100 kwanzas	Yellow-brown	Agostinho Neto and José Eduardo dos Santos	Banco Nacional de Angola	Sculpture	October 1999	1 December 1999
		200 kwanzas	Lilac	Agostinho Neto and José Eduardo dos Santos	Aerial view of Luanda	Sculpture	November 2003	19 July 2004
		500 kwanzas	Orange	Agostinho Neto and José Eduardo dos Santos	Cotton	Sculpture	November 2003	19 July 2004
		1000 kwanzas	Rose	Agostinho Neto and José Eduardo dos Santos	Coffee plantation	Sculpture	November 2003	19 July 2004
		2000 kwanzas	Lime	Agostinho Neto and José Eduardo dos Santos	Sea shore	Sculpture	November 2003	19 July 2004

==== Second series ====
The Banco Nacional de Angola issued a new series of kwanza banknotes on March 22, 2013, in denominations of 50, 100, 200 and 500 kwanzas. The other denominations (1000, 2000 and 5000 kwanzas) were issued on May 31, 2013. In 2017, the Banco Nacional de Angola issued 5 and 10 kwanzas banknotes as part of the family of banknotes first introduced in 2012.

Banknotes of the Angolan Kwanza (2012 "Waterfalls" series)
Image		Value	Main Colour	Description			Date of	
Obverse	Reverse	Value	Main Colour	Obverse	Reverse	Watermark	printing	issue
		5 kwanzas	Gray	Embroidery; Agostinho Neto and José Eduardo dos Santos	Ruacana waterfall		October 2012	2017
		10 kwanzas	Red	Embroidery; Agostinho Neto and José Eduardo dos Santos	Luena waterfall		October 2012	2017
		50 kwanzas	Yellow-orange	Carvings; Agostinho Neto and José Eduardo dos Santos	Cuemba waterfalls		October 2012	22 March 2013
		100 kwanzas	Light brown	Carvings; Agostinho Neto and José Eduardo dos Santos	Binga waterfalls		October 2012	22 March 2013
		200 kwanzas	Light violet	Embroidery; Agostinho Neto and José Eduardo dos Santos	Tchimbue waterfalls		October 2012	22 March 2013
		500 kwanzas	Orange	Embroidery; Agostinho Neto and José Eduardo dos Santos	Aundulo waterfalls		October 2012	22 March 2013
		1,000 kwanzas	Light red	Embroidery; Agostinho Neto and José Eduardo dos Santos	Kalandula waterfalls		October 2012	31 May 2013
		2,000 kwanzas	Lime green	Embroidery; Agostinho Neto and José Eduardo dos Santos	Dande waterfalls		October 2012	31 May 2013
		5,000 kwanzas	Light purple	Embroidery; Agostinho Neto and José Eduardo dos Santos	Kapanda hydroelectric dam, Kwanza River		October 2012	31 May 2013
		10,000 kwanzas	Teal	Embroidery; Agostinho Neto and José Eduardo dos Santos	Giant sable antelopes		October 2012	Not issued

==== Third series ====
In 2020, the Banco National de Angola introduced a new family of kwanza banknotes in denominations of 200, 500, 1,000, 2,000, 5,000 and 10,000 kwanzas. The new banknotes have a portrait of the first president of Angola, António Agostinho Neto. Banknotes of 200 to 2,000 kwanzas are printed on polymer substrate, while the 5,000 and 10,000 kwanzas banknotes are printed on cotton paper, with a 10,000-kwanza note to only be issued if necessary.

Banknotes of the Angolan Kwanza (2020 series)
Image		Value	Main Colour	Description			Date of	
Obverse	Reverse	Value	Main Colour	Obverse	Reverse	Watermark	printing	issue
		200 kwanzas	Blue	Agostinho Neto	Pedras Negras de Pungo a Ndongo, Malange			20 July 2020
		500 kwanzas	Brown	Agostinho Neto	Tundavala gap, Huila			17 September 2020
		1,000 kwanzas	Violet	Agostinho Neto	Planalto Central mountain range, Huambo			1 October 2020
		2,000 kwanzas	Green	Agostinho Neto	Leba mountain range, Huila			11 November 2020
		5,000 kwanzas	Purple	Agostinho Neto	Ruins of the Cathedral of São Salvador do Congo			4 February 2021

== Historical exchange rates ==
- 1977–1990: 29.918 kwanzas (AOK) or novos kwanzas (AON) per US dollar

Date	Currency code and Name	Rate (currency units per USD)
1994	AON novo kwanza	34,200 to 850,000
January to June 1995	AON novo kwanza	1,000,000 to 2,100,000
1 July 1995		1000 AON → 1 AOR (kwanza reajustado)
July to December 1995	AOR kwanza reajustado	2,100 to 13,000
1996	AOR kwanza reajustado	13,000 to 210,000 to 194,000
1997	AOR kwanza reajustado	194,000 to 253,300
1998	AOR kwanza reajustado	253,300 to 594,000
1999	AOR kwanza reajustado	594,000 to 5,400,000
1 December 1999		1 million AOR → 1 AOA (kwanza)
2000	AOA kwanza	5.4 to 16.3
2001	AOA kwanza	16.3 to 31.12
2002	AOA kwanza	31.12 to 57.47
2003	AOA kwanza	57.47 to 86.88 to 78.61
2004	AOA kwanza	78.61 to 85.90
2005	AOA kwanza	85.90 to 88.97 to 80.58
2006	AOA kwanza	80.58 to 89.01 to 80.57
2007	AOA kwanza	80.57 to 74.78 to 75.16
2008	AOA kwanza	75.16
2017	AOA kwanza	165.09
2018	AOA kwanza	238.801 to 308.61
2019	AOA kwanza	308.61 to 482.23
2020	AOA kwanza	482.23 to 649.49
2026	AOA kwanza	926

On several occasions during the 1990s, Angola's currency was the least valued currency unit in the world.

Current AOA exchange rates
From Google Finance:	AUD CAD CHF CNY EUR GBP HKD JPY USD INR KRW
From Yahoo! Finance:	AUD CAD CHF CNY EUR GBP HKD JPY USD INR KRW
From XE.com:	AUD CAD CHF CNY EUR GBP HKD JPY USD INR KRW
From OANDA:	AUD CAD CHF CNY EUR GBP HKD JPY USD INR KRW

== Production ==
The Angolan kwanza banknotes have been produced by De La Rue in England.

== See also ==
- Economy of Angola

Kwanza
Preceded by: Angolan escudo Reason: independence (in 1975); Ratio: at par	Currency of Angola; 1977 – 1990	Succeeded by: Novo kwanza Reason: government seized part of the money supply Ratio: at par (see article for more detail)

Novo kwanza
Preceded by: Kwanza; Reason: government seized part of the money supply Ratio: at par (see article for more detail)	Currency of Angola; 1990 – 1995	Succeeded by: Kwanza reajustado Reason: inflation Ratio: 1 kwanza reajustado = 1000 novos kwanzas

Kwanza reajustado
Preceded by: Novo kwanza Reason: inflation Ratio: 1 kwanza reajustado = 1000 novos kwanzas	Currency of Angola; 1995 – 1999	Succeeded by: Kwanza; Reason: inflation Ratio: 1 kwanza = 1,000,000 kwanzas reajustados

Kwanza
Preceded by: Kwanza reajustado Reason: inflation Ratio: 1 kwanza = 1,000,000 kwanzas reajustados	Currency of Angola; 1999 –	Succeeded by: Current
