= Hermenegildo Capelo =

Portuguese Naval officer and explorer (1841–1917)

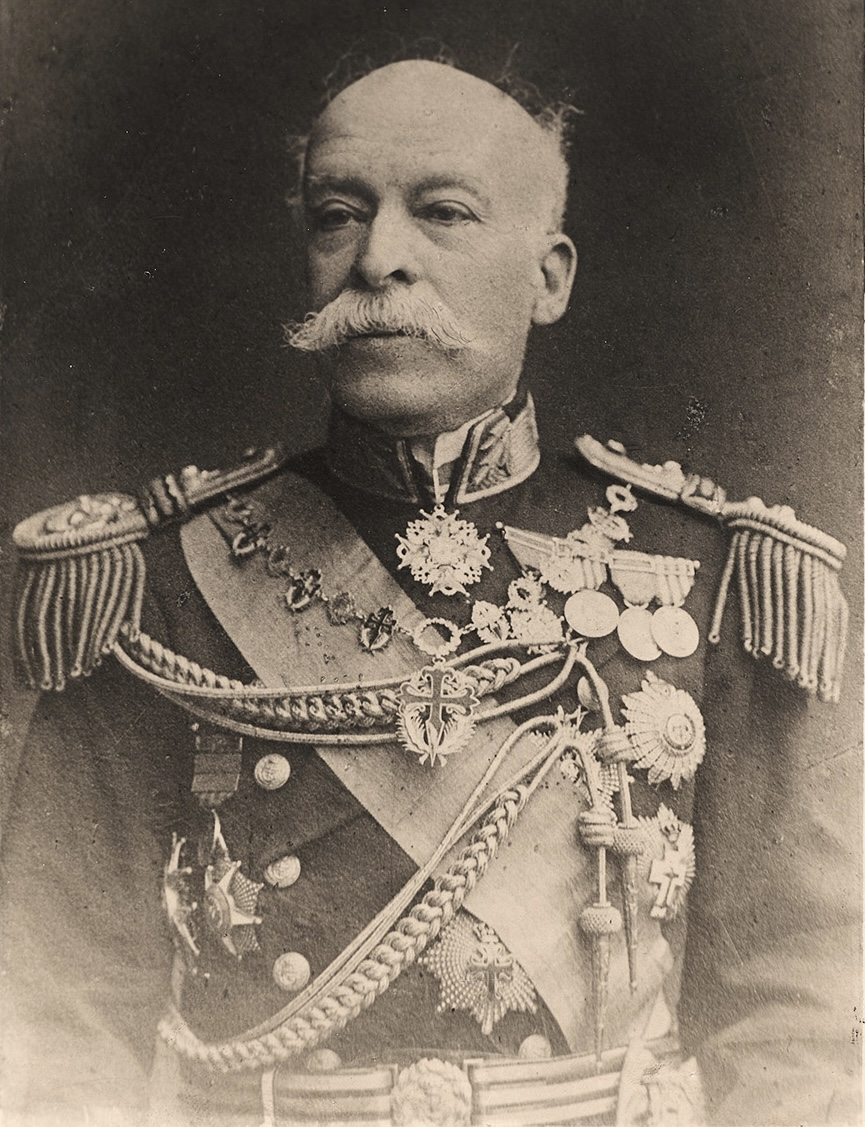
- Born: 1841; Palmela, Portugal
- Died: 1917 (aged 75–76); Lisbon, Portugal
- Occupations: Navy officer, explorer
- Known for: Leading major exploratory expeditions across central-southern Africa, particularly the 1884–1885 expedition across the continent from Angola to Mozambique, alongside Roberto Ivens.
- Military career
- Allegiance: Kingdom of Portugal
- Branch: Portuguese Navy
- Service years: 1860 – 1910
- Rank: Vice admiral

Hermenegildo de Brito Capelo (1841–1917) was a Portuguese officer in the Portuguese Navy and an explorer, who helped to chart territory between Angola and Mozambique that was unknown to Europeans in the 1870s and 1880s. Alongside Roberto Ivens, he is famous for being the first European to cross Central Africa from coast to coast between Angola and Mozambique.

Hermenegildo Capelo later rose to become aide-de-camp to King Luis I of Portugal and afterwards to King Carlos I and, later still, vice-admiral. His military career ended in 1910, when King Manuel II of Portugal was exiled.

== Early life ==
Hermenegildo de Brito Capelo was born in Palmela, Portugal, a town about 25 km (16 mi) south of Lisbon. He was born into a prominent scientific and naval family. His father, Major Félix António de Gomes Capelo, was the Governor of the Castle of Palmela. Among his siblings were notable figures in Portuguese science and exploration: António de Brito Capelo (1828–1879), a biologist and oceanographer who pioneered studies on fish and spiders, discovering several new species; Guilherme Augusto de Brito Capelo (1839–1926), a scientist and Vice-Admiral in the Portuguese Navy who also held colonial administrative roles including Governor of Angola; João Carlos de Brito Capelo (1831 – 1901) a naval officer, hydrographer, and pioneering meteorologist. He is remembered as a founding figure in Portuguese geophysical sciences, particularly meteorology, magnetism, and solar photography.

In 1860, Capelo sailed to Angola, in southwest Africa, and served on board the D Estefânia as a member of the Portuguese Navy, which was commanded by Prince Luís, staying for three years at a naval station before returning to Lisbon in 1863. He sailed to Africa again in 1866, visiting Angola, where he remained until 1869.

Before returning to Lisbon in 1876, his travels took him to Mozambique, Cape Verde, Guinea and Qing Dynasty China.

== Journeys of exploration ==
In 1875, Luciano Cordeiro, the founder of the Lisbon Geographic Society (Sociedade de Geografia de Lisboa) created the Portuguese National Commission of Exploration and Civilization of Africa (Comissão Nacional Portuguesa de Exploração e Civilização da África), more commonly known as the Commission of Africa. Cordeiro's aims were to awaken public awareness of Portugal's African colonies and to raise funds by public subscription for the scientific-geographic expeditions necessary to define a single political Portuguese territory in Africa. These expeditions led to the recognition of the Kwango River and its relations with the Zaire River. They led also to the charting of the hydrographic basin of the Zambezi River, which helped to complete the map of southern Africa. By writing in defense of the Portuguese position in Africa, he helped to create a European expansionist movement, the Sociedade de Geografia de Lisboa.

The political motivation of these expeditions anticipated the historic Berlin Conference which took place in 1885. Explorers of all European nations had launched themselves into rivalry for territorial gains, compelling Portugal to urgently review its own colonial position and the effectiveness of its presence in Africa. Portuguese ambitions to incorporate the area between Angola and Mozambique into a larger Portuguese territory led to Britain issuing the British Ultimatum to Portugal in 1890.

=== Benguela and the lands of Iaca ===
==== Planning ====
During his time in Angola, Brito Capelo conducted scientific reconnaissance of the region, which led to his appointment by royal decree on 11 May 1877 to co-lead a scientific expedition into Central Africa. The expedition also included naval officer Roberto Ivens and army major Serpa Pinto. According to the decree, they were appointed "to constitute and lead the expedition that will explore, in the interest of science and civilization, the territories between the provinces of Angola and Mozambique, and to study the relationships between the river basins of the Zaire and the Zambezi, following instructions approved by my Government." Under the auspices of the Lisbon Geographical Society, the expedition aimed to study the Cuango River in relation to the Congo River (Zaire) and the Portuguese territories on the west coast, as well as the region south and southeast of the sources of the Zambezi and Kunene Rivers, extending north into the basins of the Cuanza and Cuango Rivers. The approval of this objective reflected a victory for José Júlio Rodrigues over Luciano Cordeiro, who had supported an alternative plan for a coast-to-coast crossing through the Great Lakes region of Central Africa.

==== Expedition ====
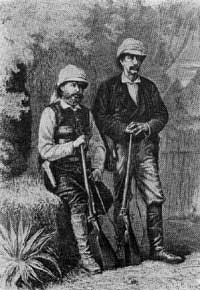
Hermenegildo Capelo (left) with Roberto Ivens in Iaca.

On July 7, 1877, Hermenegildo Capelo, Roberto Ivens and Serpa Pinto set out, but later disagreed over the aims of the expedition. From the outset of the expedition, Serpa Pinto attempted to divert its original objectives. Capelo and Ivens rejected what they considered to be "the follies of Serpa Pinto", accused him of falsification, and formally reported the separation. Serpa Pinto ultimately failed to achieve his declared goal of reaching the Mozambican coast, but he did arrive in Pretoria and subsequently in Durban.

Brito Capelo and Roberto Ivens remained committed to the original plan, focusing their efforts on the mission for which they had been appointed—namely, the study of the relationship between the Zaire and Zambezi river basins. They would later explain that they did not feel they had "the right to wander through the hinterlands at will, directing our route east or north as we pleased." They travelled through the region from Benguela to the lands of Iaca, mapping the courses of the Cubango, Luando, and Tohicapa rivers.

=== From Angola to the coast of Mozambique ===
Following a consolidation of gains in the region of the Bié Plateau and the Zambezi river and reaching the Victoria Falls, Hermenegildo Capelo and Roberto Ivens were stimulated and keen to embark upon a second, ambitious expedition.

==== Planning ====
The necessity of creating a general atlas of the Portuguese colonies led Pinheiro Chagas, at the time Overseas Minister, to create, on April 19, 1883, a Commission of Cartography. One of its intentions was to map a commercial route between Angola and Mozambique. This objective was decided upon on November 5 and the commission proceeded to make the necessary arrangements. The choice of two marine officials for this important mission was complicated by the uncertainty of what they would have to face, thus making age, as well as mapping skills and enthusiasm, an important factor in the choice. Hermenegildo Capelo and Roberto Ivens were chosen to carry through this new exploration of Africa.

==== Expedition ====
Between 1884 and 1885, Capelo and Ivens explored between the coastline of Angola and the Huila plain and later through the interior of Quelimane in Mozambique. As they continued their hydrographic studies and observations of river flow and drainage patterns, but also taking notes on the ethnographic and the linguistic characters of the people they encountered, they established a long-sought-after route via land between the coasts of Angola and Mozambique, exploring the vast regions of the interior located between these two territories. Their achievements were recorded in a two-volume book titled: De Angola à Contra-Costa (From Angola to the Other Coast).

Capelo and Ivens began this expedition on January 6, 1884, and returned to Lisbon on September 20, 1886, where they were triumphantly received by King Luís I of Portugal.

== Later career ==
Hermenegildo Capelo was made vice-president of the Overseas Institute, of which the first president was Queen Dona Amélia. His vision and his eminent skills at organization and direction were of great service to Portugal, alongside Roberto Ivens, Andrade Corvo, Luciano Cordeiro, Pinheiro Chagas, António Enes and Oliveira Martins. The Portuguese government recognized the value of these important contributions to Portuguese achievement.

Capelo became aide-de-camp to King Luis I and King Carlos I of Portugal and chief of the military house of King Manuel II, Plenipotentiary Minister of Portugal with the Sultan of Zanzibar and created a geographical map of the province of Angola.

Capelo was promoted to rear-admiral on May 17, 1902, and to vice-admiral on January 18, 1906. Dedicated to King Manuel II, Capelo accompanied His Majesty until he was exiled on October 5, 1910. On the 24th of the same month, Capelo was dismissed and his military career ended.

== Honours ==
In Porto, a street and a metro station are named after him. He also appeared on the 1000 Angolan escudo banknote issued in 1956.

== Published Works ==
- Capelo, H. (Hermenegildo); Ivens, Roberto (1882). From Benguella to the territory of Yacca. Description of a journey into Central and West Africa. Comprising narratives, adventures, and important surveys of the sources of the rivers Cunene, Cubango, Luando, Cuanza, and Cuango, and of great part of the course of the two latter; together with the discovery of the rivers Hamba, Cauali, Sussa, and Cugho, and a detailed account of the territories of Quiteca N'bungo, Sosso, Futa, and Yacca. London, S. Low, Marston, Searle, & Rivington.
- De Angola à Contracosta, 1886

== Bibliography ==
- Mendes, Gabriel (1982). "As origens da Comissão de Cartografia e a acção determinante de José Júlio Rodrigues, Luciano Cordeiro e Francisco António de Brito Limpo". Open Library.
- Fernandes, André Pires (2017). Biografia de João Carlos de Brito Capelo (Mestrado em Ciências Militares Navais). Alfeite: Escola Naval.
