= José Guedes Brandão de Melo =

Portuguese colonial administrator and military officer

Colonial governor of Cape Verde
- In office 4 February 1890 – 5 September 1893
- Preceded by: Augusto César Cardoso de Carvalho
- Succeeded by: Alexandre Alberto da Rocha de Serpa Pinto

Personal details
- Born: 30 October 1846 Massarelos, Porto
- Died: 23 September 1919 (aged 72)

José Guedes Brandão de Melo (30 October 1846 – 23 September 1919) was a Portuguese colonial administrator and a military officer. He was a son of Francisco Brandão de Melo Cogominho and Maria da Natividade Guedes de Carvalho e Meneses, who was a sister of José and Vasco Guedes de Carvalho e Meneses. He was governor general of Cape Verde from 4 February 1890 until 5 September 1893.

== See also ==
- List of colonial governors of Cape Verde

Preceded by Augusto César Cardoso de Carvalho	Colonial governor of Cape Verde; 1891–1893	Succeeded by Alexandre Alberto da Rocha de Serpa Pinto
