= José Vicente Barbosa du Bocage =

Portuguese zoologist and politician

- Born: 2 May 1823; Funchal, Madeira, Kingdom of Portugal
- Died: 3 November 1907 (aged 84); Lisbon, Kingdom of Portugal
- Education: University of Coimbra
- Occupations: Zoologist, politician, professor
- Known for: Instrucções Prácticas sobre o Modo de Colligir, Preparar e Remetter Productos Zoológicos para o Museu de Lisboa
- Scientific career
- Institutions: University of Lisbon
- Author abbrev. (zoology): Bocage

José Vicente Barbosa du Bocage (2 May 1823 – 3 November 1907) was a Portuguese zoologist, politician, and professor. He served as a professor of zoology and director of the National Museum of Natural History and Science at the Polytechnic Institute of Lisbon. Bocage's scientific work led to the description of numerous species, particularly of Portugal and its overseas territories.

Bocage held multiple public offices, including Minister of the Navy and Oversea. He was involved in colonial and geographical policy, co-founding the Lisbon Geographic Society and representing Portugal at the Berlin Conference, where he advocated for Portuguese claims in Africa. Several species have been named after him.

== Early life ==
José Vicente Barbosa du Bocage was born on May 2, 1823, in Funchal, Portugal, into the Du Bocage family of French descendancy. His father, João José Barbosa du Bocage, was a cadet in the army and emigrated to Brazil in 1830 due to his opposition to the absolutist regime of King Miguel I of Portugal. The family reunited in Rio de Janeiro, where Bocage's maternal uncle, José Ferreira Pestana, had established a school where both his parents taught. Following the triumph of the liberal cause in 1834, the family returned to Funchal, where João José served as a customs officer.

In 1839, Bocage enrolled at the University of Coimbra, initially studying mathematics and later pursuing medicine. He graduated in 1846 with a bachelor's degree in medicine. During the Little Civil War, he joined the academic battalion, supporting the liberal cause. After the war, he established a medical practice in Lisbon and was appointed to the Hospital de São José. That same year, he married Teresa Roma, with whom he had one son, Carlos Roma du Bocage.

== Zoology ==
Bocage began his academic career in 1849 when he was appointed as a substitute teacher in zoology at the Polytechnic Institute of Lisbon. By 1851, he had become a full professor and remained in the position for more than 30 years. The institute later became part of the Faculty of Science of the University of Lisbon.

In 1858, Bocage was appointed as the scientific director and curator of zoology at the National Museum of Natural History and Science, part of the Polytechnic School. During his tenure, he organized the museum's zoological collections, adopting an acquisition policy that prioritized filling gaps within taxonomic groups rather than broad expansion.

Bocage published numerous works on specimen classification, with a focus on the fauna of Portugal and its African colonies, particularly Angola. He collaborated with field collectors like Joseph of Anchieta, who contributed with extensive collections from Angola.

Throughout his career, Bocage published 177 scientific papers and described approximately 100 new species, focusing on the classification of mammals, birds, reptiles, amphibians, insects, and sponges. His scientific collaborations extended internationally, including with the Natural History Museum in Paris, where he secured collections in exchange for Portuguese specimens taken during the Napoleonic invasion of Iberia. In 1875, Bocage co-founded the Lisbon Geographic Society and served as its president from 1877 to 1883. In 1905, the museum was renamed in his honour by government decree.

== Politics ==
Bocage was actively involved in public life and politics. He joined the Regenerator Party, a political party in Portugal, and was elected as a deputy for Montemor-o-Novo municipality in 1879. He served on committees for Public Instruction, Health, Foreign Affairs, and Overseas Territories, advocating for a structured colonization policy and supporting Portuguese geographical knowledge and expansion in Africa.

In 1881, Bocage was appointed as a Peer of the realm and subsequently served as Minister of the Navy and Overseas in the government of Fontes Pereira de Melo. His tenure saw significant developments in Portuguese colonial policy, including the establishment of a regular steamship line between Lisbon and Mozambique. Bocage helped organize the Berlin Conference, which outlined principles for territorial claims in Africa. He advocated for Portuguese control of territories connecting Angola and Mozambique, a vision partially articulated in the Pink Map, although ultimately opposed by British interests.

== Honours ==
Bocage earned several honours, including the Portuguese Military Order of Saint James of the Sword, the Spanish Cross of Naval Merit, the Austrian Order of Franz Joseph, the Brazilian Order of the Rose, and the rank of officer in the French Legion of Honour. In 1903, the Lisbon Geographic Society held a ceremony in his honour, where King Carlos I of Portugal awarded him a medal of honour in recognition of his contributions to science and the Portuguese nation.

== Taxa named in his honour ==
Several species are named after Bocage. Two birds (Nectarinia bocagii and Sheppardia bocagei), two extant lizards (Podarcis bocagei and Trachylepis bocagii), and the extinct ornithopod dinosaur Cariocecus bocagei, bear his name.

== Selected works ==
- A ornitologia dos Açores, 1866
- Aves das possessões portuguesas d' Africa occidental que existem no Museu de Lisboa, da 1ª à 24ª lista, 1868 a 1882
- Lista dos répteis das possessões portuguesas d' Africa occidental que existem no Museu de Lisboa, 1866
- Notice sur un batracien nouveau du Portugal, 1864
- Diagnose de algumas espécies inéditas da família Squalidae que frequentam os nossos mares, 1864
- Peixes plagiostomos, 1866
- Ornithologie d' Angola, 1881 and 1877
- Herpethologie d' Angola et du Congo, 1895

== See also ==
- Category:Taxa named by José Vicente Barbosa du Bocage
