= Lisbon Geographic Society =

Portuguese scientific society

Lisbon Geographic Society Sociedade de Geografia de Lisboa
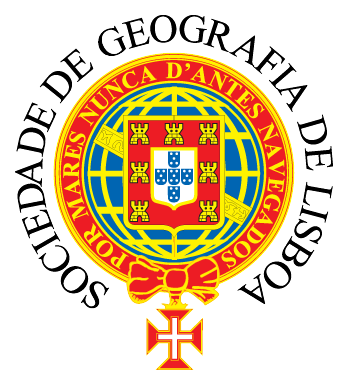
- Formation: November 10, 1875; 149 years ago
- Type: Learned society
- Headquarters: Rua das Portas de Santo Antão, 100 1150-269 Lisboa, Portugal
- President: Luís Aires Barros
- Website: www.socgeografialisboa.pt

The Lisbon Geographic Society (Portuguese: Sociedade de Geografia de Lisboa) is a Portuguese scientific society created in Lisbon in the year of 1875, aiming to "promote and assist the study and progress of geography and related sciences in Portugal."

The Society was created in the context of the European movement of exploration and colonization, having its activity particular emphasis in the exploration of the African Continent.

== History ==
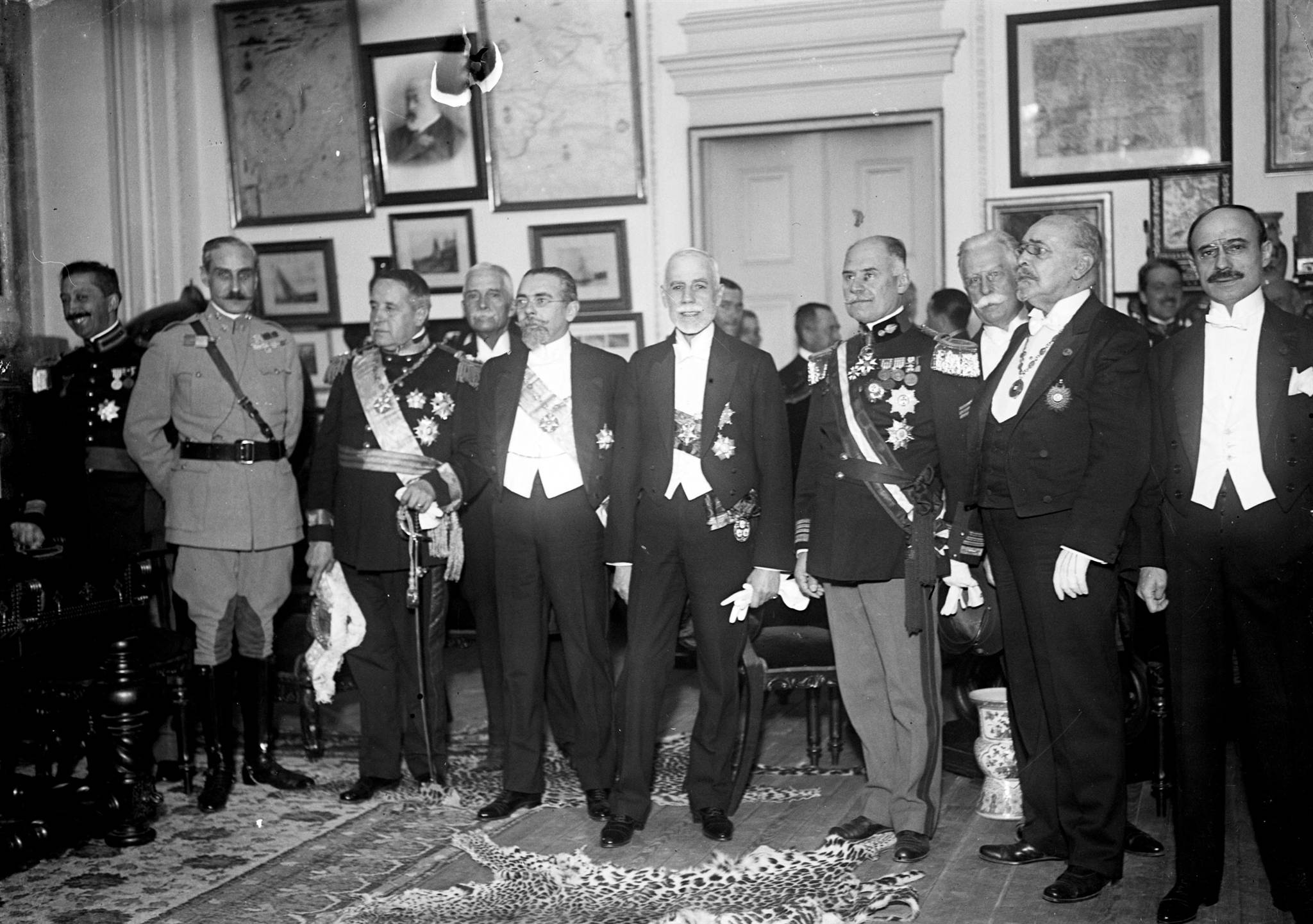
President Manuel Teixeira Gomes visiting the society in 1923.

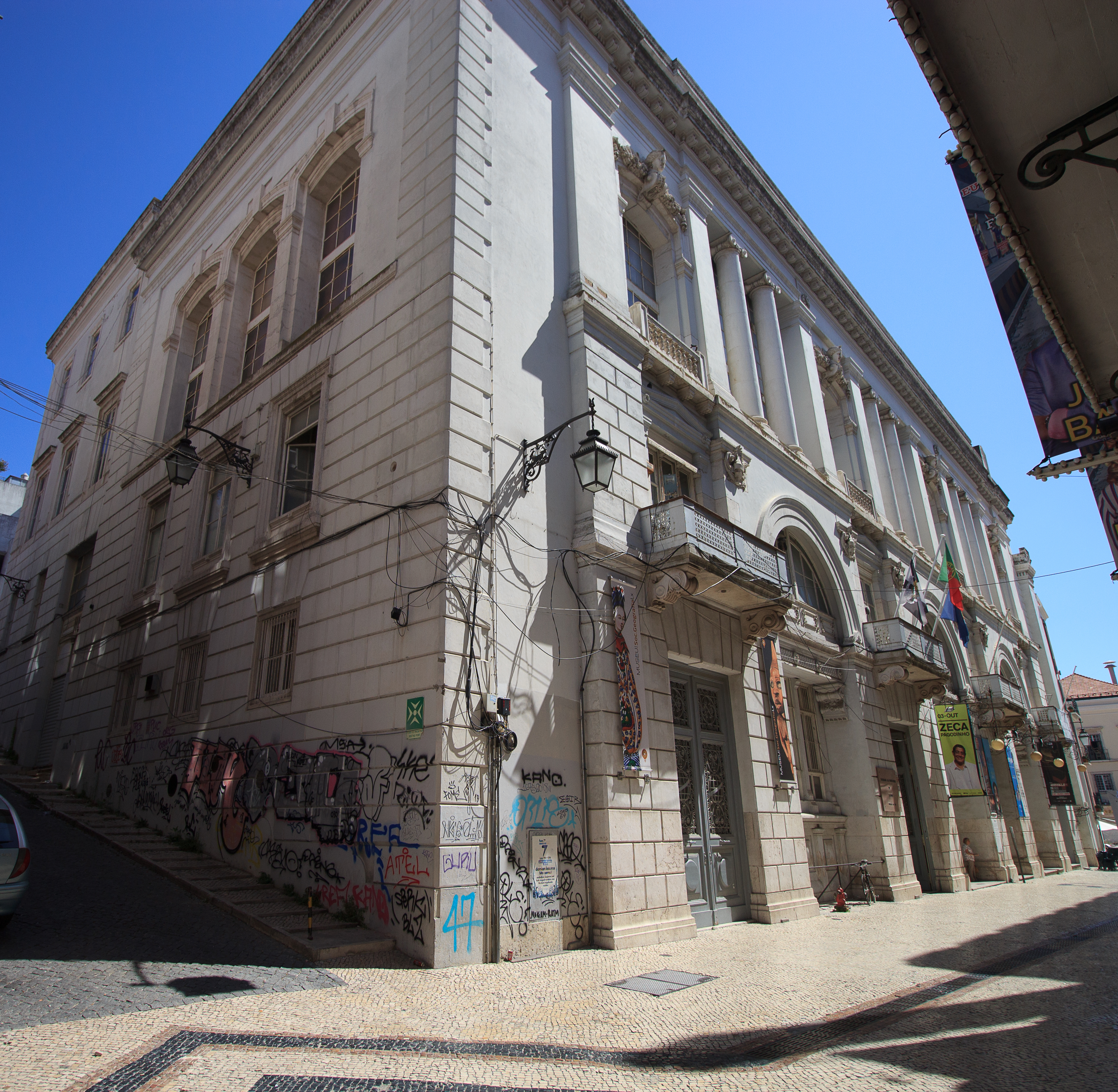
Headquarters of the Lisbon Geographic Society in Arroios, Lisbon.

On 10 November 1875, a group of 74 subscribers petition King Luís I of Portugal the creation of a society, to be called Real Sociedade de Geografia de Lisboa, with the objective to "promote and assist the study and progress of geography and related sciences in the country."

Two early subscribers were Luciano Cordeiro and Teófilo Braga, among many other intellectuals, journalists, and politicians of that time.

The Society's goals were to organize conferences and scientific congresses, and grant funds destined to exploration trips and scientific investigation.

In December 1876, the Society initiated the publication of the Boletim da Sociedade de Geografia de Lisboa (Lisbon's Geographic Society Bulletin), still in force today.

== Organization ==
- President
- 4 Vice Presidents
- Perpetual Secretary
- Secretary General
- 2 Vice Secretaries
- Treasurer
- 6 member administration comcittee
- Museum Director
- Audit Committee
- 3 Staff
- 2 Substitutes

== Commissions ==
The African Commission, which aims to study issues related to scientific knowledge and the development of Africa and particularly with regard to Portuguese-speaking African Countries and other areas where the Portuguese cultural heritage is felt.

The American Commission, whose purpose is the study and consultation of matters that matter to the relations and interests of Portuguese nationality in America and Polynesia, and apart from Portugal in the discovery, colonization and civilization of those parts of the world.

The Asian Commission, whose purpose is the study and consultation of studies relevant to Asian languages, religions and races and to Portugal's relations and interests in that part of the world and in Australia.

The Commission of Lusophone Communities

The Emigration Commission, whose purpose is the study and consultation of matters that matter to Portuguese emigration, in order to mitigate, instruct, direct and protect, for the benefit of the Country.

The Côrte-Real Studies Commission, whose objective is to study the theme related to the work of Portuguese pioneers in the discovery of lands to the west of Portugal, now known by the name of North America but which for a long time appear on maps as “land of the Corte-Reais”, since the Portuguese navigators of the Corte-Real family were those who most distinguished themselves in their discovery.

The European Commission, aims at the study and consultation that matter to the scientific knowledge of Europe and its structures and institutions and to the position of Portugal as an integral part of this reality.

The Nature Protection Commission, whose objective is the study and dissemination of issues related to nature conservation, contributing to the knowledge, defense and enhancement of the natural and scenic heritage of Mainland, Insular and Oceanic Portugal and to promote the development of in international circles, giving special attention to Portuguese-speaking Countries and Communities where our cultural heritage is felt. The International Relations Commission, within the scope of a theoretical framework, covers the scientific field of International Relations in an inter-sectoral perspective with the African, American, Asian and European Commissions.

== Ethnographic Museum ==
The Ethnographic Museum has a collection in the areas of Ethnology and History, with the former Portuguese colonies in Africa and Asia.

The Museum consists of several rooms:

The Portugal Room, where most of the museum's collection is located, is 50m long, surrounded by two orders of galleries;

The Algarve Room features a large planisphere with the routes of the Discoveries of Portuguese navigators between the 15th and 17th centuries;

The India Room where flags of various expeditions to Africa and two large globes by Coronelli are displayed, as well as portulans, manuscripts and engravings;

The Markers Room composed of Portuguese pieces, highlighting the stone markers ("padrões") set by the Portuguese on the African coast.

The Lisbon Geography Society Library has national and international recognition as essential for the study of the History of Discoveries and Portuguese Expansion.

The bibliographic collection consists of 62,000 works, several magazines and around 6,000 handwritten documents, in a total of 230,000 titles, which, the travel diaries of Hermenegildo Capelo, Robertovens, Silva Porto and Gago Cou as well as the collection of by George Chinnery.

In the Mapoteca ("map library") where the cartographic collection is found, important examples of Portuguese and foreign atlases, maps and plans from that period.

== Presidents ==
Presidents of the society have included:^{(pt)}

- Januário Correia de Almeida, 1876-1877
- José Vicente Barbosa du Bocage, 1877-1883
- António Augusto de Aguiar, 1884-1887
- Francisco Maria da Cunha, 1888-1890
- António Pereira Sampaio, 1891-1893
- Francisco Ferreira do Amaral, 1894-1908
- Zózimo Consiglieri Pedroso, 1909-1910
- Bernardino Machado, 1910-1912
- Anselmo Braamcamp Freire, 1913-1921
- Vicente d’Almeida d’Eça, 1922-1924
- Tomás Garcia Rosado, 1925-1926
- Pedro José da Cunha, 1927-1928
- José Capelo Franco Frazão, Conde Penha Garcia, 1928-1940
- João de Azevedo Coutinho, 1940-1944
- Manuel Moreira Júnior, 1945-1952
- António Mendes Correia, 1952-1960
- Ruy Enes Ulrich, 1960-1964
- Adriano Moreira, 1964-1974
- Fernando Fonseca, 1975-1978
- Barahona Fernandes, 1978-1983
- Henrique Serra Brandão, 1983-1988
- António de Sousa Leitão, 1988-2000
- Luís Aires Barros, 2000–present
