= Luciano Cordeiro =

Portuguese writer

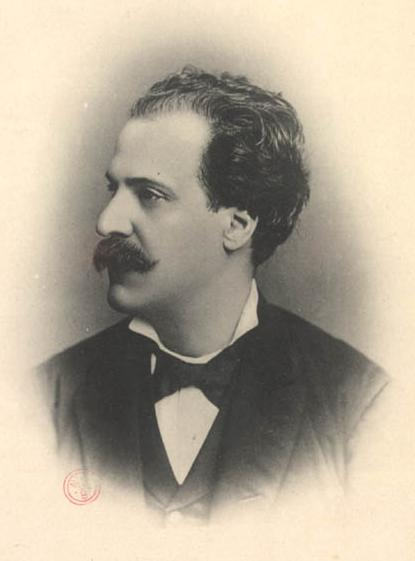
- Born: 21 July 1844; Mirandela, Portugal
- Died: 24 December 1900 (aged 56); Lisbon, Portugal
- Occupations: Writer, historian, politician and geographer

Luciano Cordeiro (Mirandela, 21 July 1844 – Lisbon, 24 December 1900) was a Portuguese writer, historian, politician and geographer.

== Publications ==
- "Livro de crítica" (Porto, 1869)
- "Segundo Livro de crítica" (1871)
- "De la part prise par les Portugais dans la découverte de l'Amérique" (1875)
- "L'Hydrographie africaine" (1879)
- "Dos Bancos portuguezes" (Lisbon, 1873)
- "Viagens" (1874–1875)
- "Estros e palcos" (1874)
- "Soror Marianna" (1888)
