= Roberto Ivens =

Portuguese explorer (1850–1898)

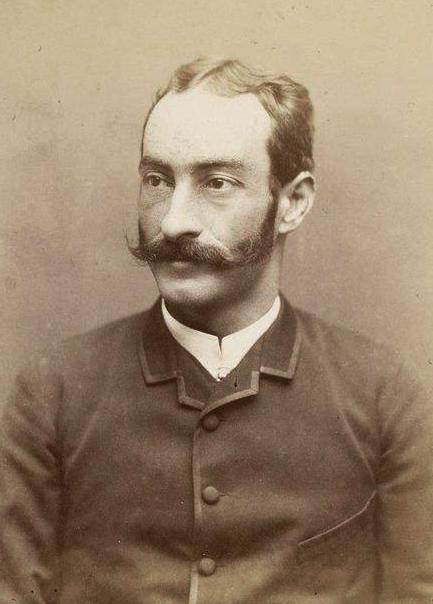
- Born: 12 June 1850; Ponta Delgada, Azores, Portugal
- Died: 28 January 1898 (aged 47); Oeiras, Portugal
- Occupations: Navy officer, explorer, geographer, colonial administrator
- Known for: First European (alongside Hermenegildo Capelo) to cross Central Africa from coast to coast between Angola and Mozambique.
- Military career
- Allegiance: Kingdom of Portugal
- Branch: Portuguese Navy
- Service years: 1861–?

Roberto Ivens (12 June 1850 in Ponta Delgada – 28 January 1898 in Dafundo, Oeiras) was a Portuguese explorer of Africa, geographer, colonial administrator, and an officer of the Portuguese Navy.

== Early life ==
Roberto Ivens was the son of Margarida Júlia de Medeiros Castelo Branco and Robert Breakspeare Ivens (1822–?). Margarida was of lower nobility and Roberto's Grandfather, William Ivens, was a merchant awarded the Ivens Arms by George III in 1816. Robert Breakspeare Ivens was a great-grandson of Thomas Hickling (Boston 1745–1836 Ponta Delgada) the American vice-consul in Ponta Delgada.

In 1861, Ivens attended the Navy School in Lisbon. At school Roberto was known as "Roberto of the Devil" and he became known as an intelligent young gentleman. He joined the Portuguese Navy in 1870 at the age of 20 and attended Escola Prática de Artilharia Naval in 1871. Ivens left for the Suez Canal in September of the same year, where he was the garrison of the Estefânia.

== Travels ==
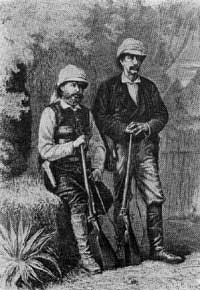
Roberto Ivens (right) with Hermenegildo Capelo in Iaca.

Ivens began his travels in Angola in 1872. On 10 October 1874 he completed three years of travels in the colonies. Returning to Portugal in January 1875, Ivens made examination for lieutenant. In April 1875, he sailed on the Duque de Terceira for Portuguese São Tomé and Príncipe and various ports of South America.

In 1876, Ivens set out for the United States, bringing Portuguese products to Philadelphia for the Centennial Exposition. His ancestor, Thomas Hickling, had been an ardent American revolutionary, and had in fact left Boston for the Azores following an argument with his loyalist father.

Ivens went on an expedition into the provinces of Angola and Mozambique beginning on 11 May 1877, and studied relations between hydrographic basins in Zambezi. His hydrographic studies are considered even today to be "amazingly perfect". In the same year he was promoted to the rank of first lieutenant.

Ivens went on an expedition on 21 June 1885 at Quelimane in Mozambique. Ivens, as requested by the King Luís I, and in the aftermath of the Berlin Conference, to travel between Angola and Mozambique, which ended in over 4,500 miles (about 8,300 km) of which 1/3 was uncharted in what was called "Pink Map".

For his service to Portugal, Roberto had the honor of being named aide-de-camp to King Luís. In 1895, he was made Officer of Military Order of Aviz and was nominated on October 17 as secretary of the Commission of Cartography.

== Honours ==
Portugal has ten streets named after Roberto Ivens including one in Ponta Delgada named Avenida Roberto Ivens. Several schools are named in his honor, including Escola Básica Integrada Roberto Ivens, near his birthplace.

A species of African lizard, Lubuya ivensii, is named in his honor.

He was also portrayed in the 500 Angolan escudo banknote issued in 1956.

In 2019, TAP Air Portugal named an Airbus A321, registered CS-TXD, for Roberto Ivens.

== Partial list of works ==
- De Benguela às Terras de Iaca 1881
- De Angola à Contracosta 1886

== See also ==
- Portuguese Empire
- European exploration of Africa
- Hydrography
