= Angolan escudo =

Currency of Angola between 1914 and 1928 and again between 1958 and 1977

Unit
- Symbol: Dollar sign with two vertical lines

Denominations
- Subunit
- 1/100: Centavo
- Banknotes: 20, 50, 100, 500, 1000 escudos
- Coins: 10, 20, 50 centavos, 1, 2 1/2, 5, 10, 20 escudos

Demographics
- User(s): Angola

Issuance
- Central bank: Banco Nacional Ultramarino (1914–1926); Banco de Angola (1926–1977)
- This infobox shows the latest status before this currency was rendered obsolete.

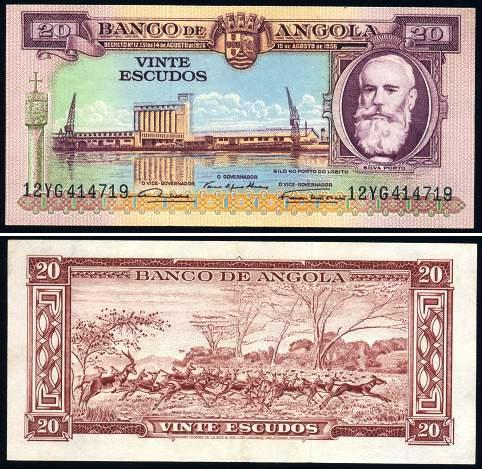
20-escudo note

The escudo was the currency of Angola between 1914 and 1928 and again between 1958 and 1977. It was subdivided into 100 centavos with the macuta worth 5 centavos and was equivalent to the Portuguese escudo.

== History ==
The introduction of the escudo in Portugal's colonies took place in 1914, three years after it occurred in Portugal. The escudo replaced the real at a rate of 1000 réis = 1 escudo. In 1928, the angolar was introduced. Banknotes were exchanged at a rate of 1.25 escudos = 1 angolar, whilst centavo coins used with the escudo continued to be used with the angolar with no change in value. The angolar was pegged at parity with the Portuguese escudo, as the Angolan escudo had been before 1928. Thus, the currency reform constituted a devaluation of the escudo banknotes.

In 1953, Portugal began unifying the currencies of its colonies. This process was completed in Angola at the end of 1958, with the reintroduction of the escudo. The escudo was replaced in 1977 by the kwanza at par.

== Coins ==
In 1921, bronze 1, 2 and 5 centavo and cupro-nickel 10 and 20 centavo coins were introduced, followed the next year by nickel 50 centavos. In 1927, cupro-nickel 1, 2 and 4 macuta and 50 centavo coins were introduced. These coins continued to circulate when the angolar was introduced, with bronze 10 and 20 centavo coins introduced in 1948.

In 1952, the first escudo coins were introduced, although the escudo did not officially replace the angolar until the end of 1958. Silver 10 and 20 escudos were introduced in 1952, followed by bronze 50 centavos and 1 escudo, and cupro-nickel 2 1/2 escudos in 1953. Cupro-nickel replaced silver in the 10 escudos in 1969, with nickel replacing silver in the 20 escudos in 1971. Cupro-nickel 5 escudos were introduced in 1972.

== Banknotes ==
In 1914, the Banco Nacional Ultramarino introduced notes in denominations of 10, 20 and 50 centavos. 5 centavo notes followed in 1918, with 50 escudos introduced in 1920. In 1921, 1, 2 1/2, 5, 10, 20 and 100 escudo notes were added. State notes for 50 centavos were also introduced in 1921.

In 1958, notes (dated 1956) were introduced by the Banco de Angola in denominations of 20, 50, 100, 500 and 1000 escudos. These five denominations were issued until the introduction of the kwanza.

1914 escudo
| Preceded by: Angolan real Reason: inflation Ratio: 1 Angolan escudo = 1000 réis = 1 Portuguese escudo | Currency of Angola; January 1, 1914 – 1928 | Succeeded by: Angolan angolar Reason: Counter measure of Alves Reis's scheme Ratio: 1 angolar = 1.25 escudos |

1958 escudo
| Preceded by: Angolan angolar Reason: unifying the currencies of the Portuguese colonies Ratio: at par, 1 Angolan escudo = Portuguese escudo | Currency of Angola; 1958 – 1977 | Succeeded by: Angolan kwanza Reason: independence (in 1975); Ratio: at par |
