= 1517 =

1517 in various calendars
- Gregorian calendar: 1517; MDXVII
- Ab urbe condita: 2270
- Armenian calendar: 966; ԹՎ ՋԿԶ
- Assyrian calendar: 6267
- Balinese saka calendar: 1438–1439
- Bengali calendar: 923–924
- Berber calendar: 2467
- English Regnal year: 8 Hen. 8 – 9 Hen. 8
- Buddhist calendar: 2061
- Burmese calendar: 879
- Byzantine calendar: 7025–7026
- Chinese calendar: 丙子年 (Fire Rat); 4214 or 4007 — to — 丁丑年 (Fire Ox); 4215 or 4008
- Coptic calendar: 1233–1234
- Discordian calendar: 2683
- Ethiopian calendar: 1509–1510
- Hebrew calendar: 5277–5278
- Hindu calendars
- Vikram Samvat: 1573–1574
- Shaka Samvat: 1438–1439
- Kali Yuga: 4617–4618
- Holocene calendar: 11517
- Igbo calendar: 517–518
- Iranian calendar: 895–896
- Islamic calendar: 922–923
- Japanese calendar: Eishō 14 (永正１４年)
- Javanese calendar: 1434–1435
- Julian calendar: 1517; MDXVII
- Korean calendar: 3850
- Minguo calendar: 395 before ROC 民前395年
- Nanakshahi calendar: 49
- Thai solar calendar: 2059–2060
- Tibetan calendar: མེ་ཕོ་བྱི་བ་ལོ་ (male Fire-Rat); 1643 or 1262 or 490 — to — མེ་མོ་གླང་ལོ་ (female Fire-Ox); 1644 or 1263 or 491

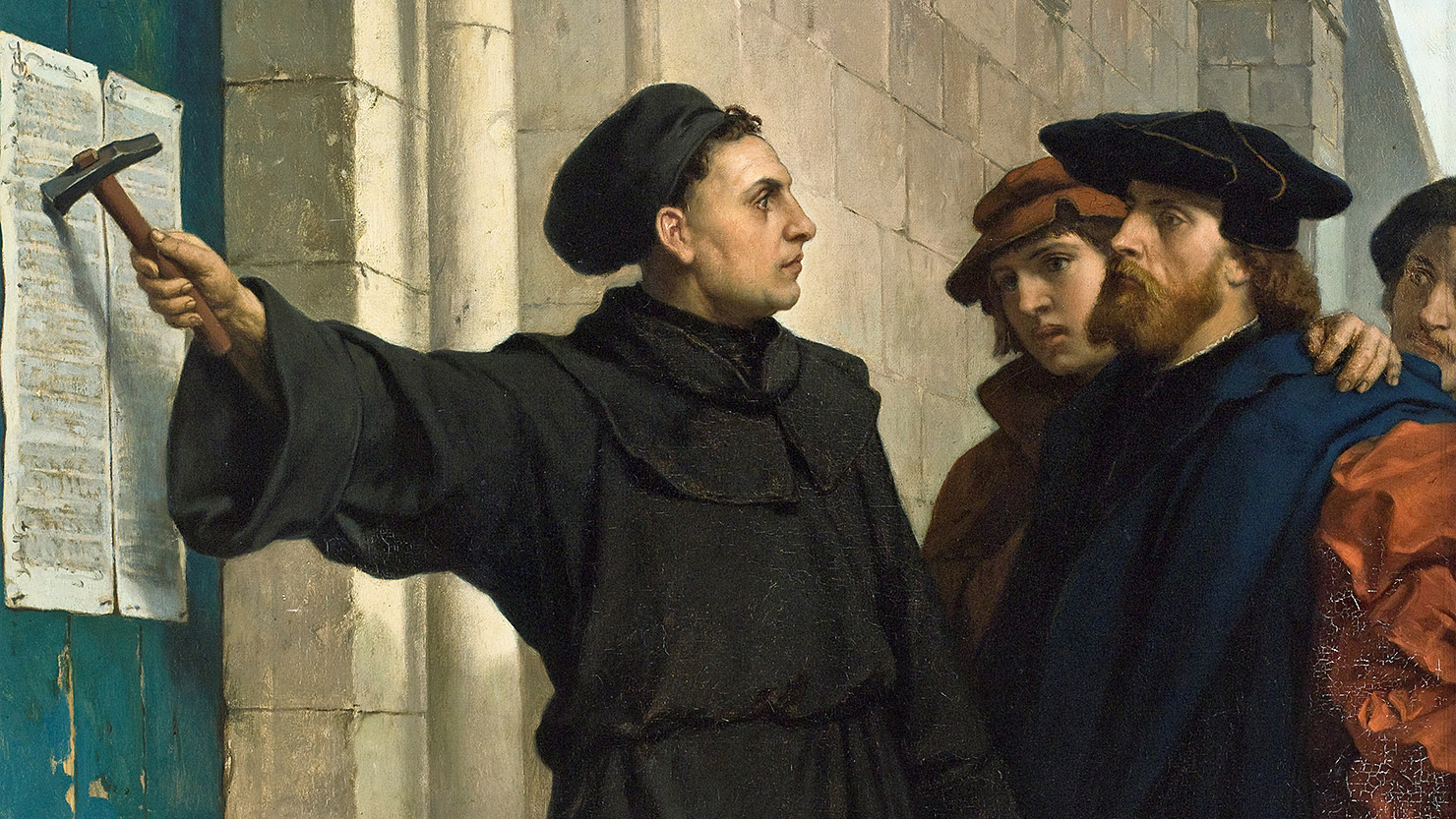
October 31: Martin Luther nails his theological manifesto, the Ninety-five Theses, to the door of the All Saints' Church in Wittenberg and begins the Protestant Reformation.

Year 1517 (MDXVII) was a common year starting on Thursday of the Julian calendar.

== Events ==
=== January–March ===
- January 22 – Battle of Ridaniya: The Ottoman army of sultan Selim I defeats the Mamluk army in Egypt, commanded by king Tuman Bay II.
- January 30 – Cairo is captured by the Ottoman Empire after a three day battle, and the Mamluk Sultanate falls. The Abbasid Caliphate, reestablished in 1261, falls to the Ottomans and the last Caliph, Al-Mutawakkil III, is deported along with his family to Constantinople.
- February 3 – The Ottoman Sultan Selim I makes a triumphant entry into Cairo after his Janissaries have cleared the area of the Mamluk defenders.
- February 8 – Bernal Díaz del Castillo, a chronicler who documents the conquest of Mexico, sets out with the Hernández de Córdoba expedition from Jaruco. They arrive at Cape Catoche twenty-one days later, and are met with hostility by the natives. Henry's 25-year-old sister Anne of Navarre serves as the regent until 1518, when Henry reaches the age of majority.
- February 12 – At the age of 13, Henry II becomes the King of Navarre, by then limited to the part of the Iberian peninsula north of the Pyrennes, upon the death of his mother, Queen Catherine in the capital, Pamplona.
- March 4 – The first intentional landing by Europeans on the coast of Mexico takes place as the Cordoba Expedition arrives at Cabo Catoche on the Yucatán Peninsula, now in the Mexican state of Quintana Roo. The Spaniards are attacked by the Mayans after being invited to visit, and a battle breaks out with 13 Spaniards ambushed and 15 Mayans killed.
- March 16 – The Fifth Council of the Lateran ends after almost five years of conferences on discussing reforms within the Roman Catholic Church.
- March 26 – More than two months after fleeing Cairo and attempting a counterattack against the Ottomans, Tuman Bay II is captured alive with many of his Mamluk officers. Selim initially plans to exile Tuman Bey and other former Mamluk nobles to Constantinople, but changes his mind.

=== April–June ===
- April 12 – Lopo Soares de Albergaria of Portugal begins the siege of Jeddah (now part of Saudi Arabia), attempting to invade, but is unable to land because of artillery fire from the Ottoman and Mamluk defenders. Bad weather prevents the Portuguese fleet of 15 ships from navigating for the next two weeks.
- April 13 – Tuman Bey II, the former King of Egypt, is executed along with his aides, bringing an end to the Abbasid dynasty.
- April 14 – On Easter Tuesday, Dr. Bell, a preacher standing at St Paul's Cross in front of London's Old St Paul's Cathedral, delivers an inflammatory sermon at the instigation of a local broker, John Lincoln and accuses foreign immigrants of stealing jobs from English workers and taking away bread from "poor fatherless children."
- April 15 – The Ottoman–Mamluk War officially ends as the Ottoman Empire annexes the Mamluk Sultanate territories in the Middle East (the Levant), the Arabian Peninsula (Hejaz) and Egypt as provinces.
- April 22 – In what is now Romania, Stephen IV becomes the new Prince of Moldavia at Suceava upon the death of his father, Bogdan III the One-Eyed.
- April 25 – After 13 days of continuous storms and being unable to do more than destroy one Jeddah ship (while losing two of its own), the Portuguese fleet abandon its planned invasion of the Arabian peninsula.
- April 30 – Anticipating a riot in London, the Lord Mayor announces at 8:30 in the evening that a curfew will begin within 30 minutes, at 9:00. An attempt by a local alderman, John Mundy, to enforce the curfew triggers the attack by a mob hours later.
- May 1 – Evil May Day: Xenophobic riots break out in London as English citizens attack foreigners, including Flemish shoemakers and French royal courtiers. The Duke of Norfolk leads a private army of 1,300 men to put down the rioting.
- May 10 – The coronation of Queen Consort Claude of France, wife of King Francis I, takes place at the Basilica of St Denis with Cardinal Philippe de Luxembourg performing the ceremony.
- June 17 – A fleet of eight ships of the navy of Portugal, commanded by Fernão Pires de Andrade and dispatched from Goa by Portuguese India's Governor Lopo Soares de Albergaria on orders of King Manuel I, arrives in China at Canton (now Guangzhou) and brings the Ambassador Tomé Pires and his diplomatic corps to start trade and foreign relations.
- June 24 – Pier Gerlofs Donia, leader of a rebellion of the Frisians minority of the Netherlands, leads 4,000 of his Arumer Zwarte Hoop soldiers on an attack against the Dutch inhabitants of Medemblik, then moves on to a massacre of the residents of the village of Asperen.

=== July–September ===
- July 1 – In an unprecedented move, Pope Leo X increases the number of Roman Catholic cardinals, naming 31 people to the cardinalate including the Dutch-born Adriaan van Utrecht, bishop of Tortosa, who will later become Pope Adrian VI.
- August 15 – Portuguese merchant Fernão Pires de Andrade meets Ming Dynasty Chinese officials through an interpreter, at the Pearl River estuary and lands, at what is now in the jurisdiction of Hong Kong. Although the first European trade expeditions to China took place in 1513 and 1516 by Jorge Álvares and Rafael Perestrello, respectively, Andrade's mission is the first official diplomatic mission of a European power to China, commissioned by a ruler of Europe (Manuel I of Portugal).
- September 13 – Yunus Pasha, the Grand Vizier of the Ottoman Empire and the Ottoman Governor of Egypt after leading the Egyptian conquest, is fired by the Ottoman Sultan Selim I and then executed by decapitation.

=== October–December ===
- October 31 – Martin Luther publishes his 95 Theses (posting them on the door of the Wittenberg Castle Church), and begins the Protestant Reformation. This story is possibly apocryphal.
- November 21 – In India, Ibrahim Khan Lodi becomes the new Sultan of Delhi upon the death of his father, Sikandar Khan Lodi. Ibrahim will reign until 1526, when the Sultanate of Delhi is conquered by the Afghan Mughal king, Babur.
- December 6 – Bona Sforza of Italy, daughter of the late Duke of Milan, Gian Galeazzo Sforza, marries King Sigismund of Poland by proxy at Naples, then begins a three month journey to Kraków to assume the throne.

=== Date unknown ===
- Grand Prince Vasili III of Muscovy conquers Ryazan.
- A third outbreak of the sweating sickness in England hits Oxford and Cambridge. It is said that in Oxford that upwards of 400 students died in less than a week.

== Births ==
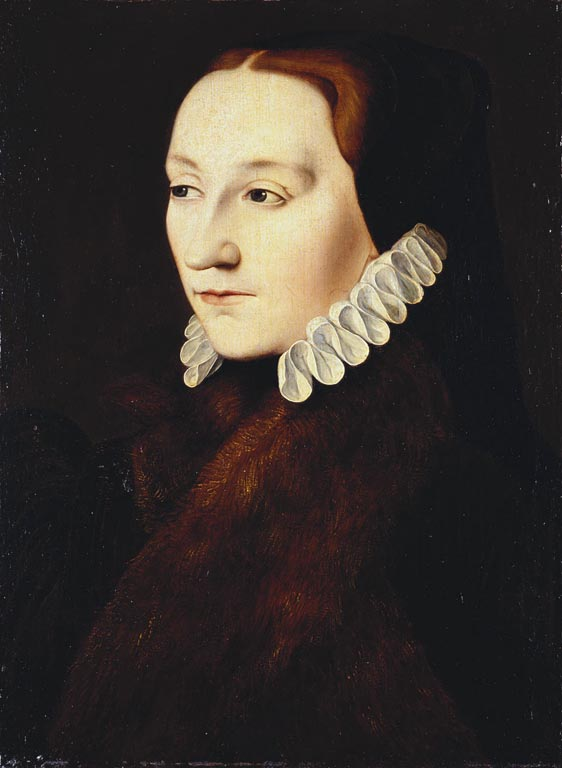
Frances Grey, Duchess of Suffolk

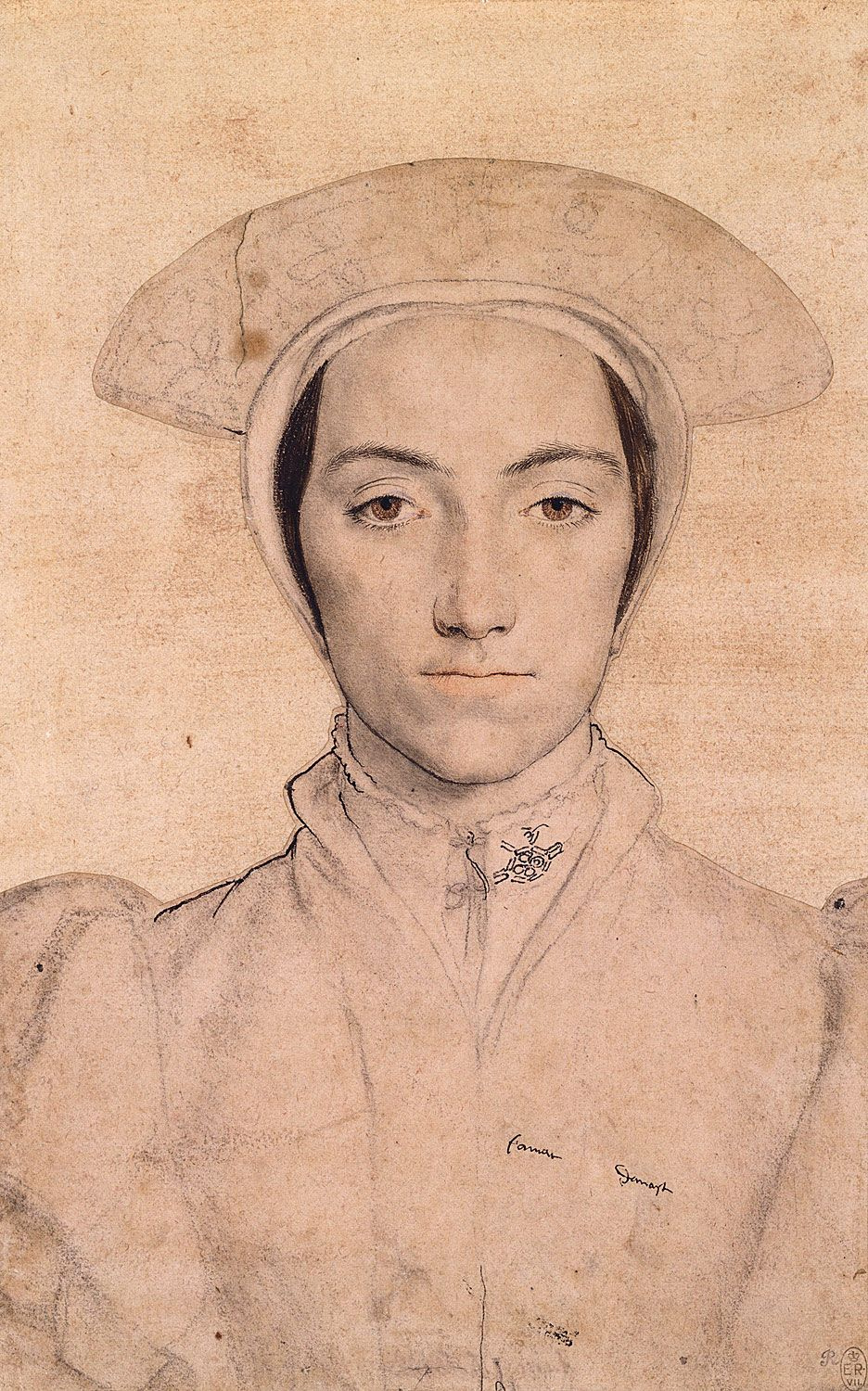
Amalia of Cleves

- January 17
  - Henry Grey, Duke of Suffolk, English duke (d. 1554)
  - Antonio Scandello, Italian composer (d. 1580)
- January 30 – Joannes Aurifaber Vratislaviensis, German theologian (d. 1568)
- January 31 – Gioseffo Zarlino, Italian composer (d. 1590)
- February 2 – Gotthard Kettler, Duke of Courland and Semigallia (d. 1587)
- February 12 – Luigi Cornaro, Italian Catholic cardinal (d. 1584)
- March 29 – Carlo Carafa, Italian Catholic cardinal (d. 1561)
- May 1 – Svante Stensson Sture, Swedish count (d. 1567)
- June 18 – Emperor Ōgimachi, Japanese emperor (d. 1593)
- June 29 – Rembert Dodoens, Flemish botanist (d. 1585)
- July 10 – Odet de Coligny, French cardinal and Protestant (d. 1571)
- July 16 – Frances Grey, Duchess of Suffolk, English duchess (d. 1559)
- July 20 – Peter Ernst I von Mansfeld-Vorderort, Governor of the Habsburg Netherlands (d. 1604)
- July 25 – Jacques Pelletier du Mans, French mathematician (d. 1582)
- August 20 – Antoine Perrenot de Granvelle, statesman, French Catholic cardinal (d. 1586)
- August 23 – Francis I, Duke of Lorraine (d. 1545)
- September 6 – Francisco de Holanda, Portuguese artist (d. 1585)
- October 17 – Amalia of Cleves, German princess and writer (d. 1586)
- October 18 – Manuel da Nóbrega, Spanish Catholic priest (d. 1570)
- December 15 – Giacomo Gaggini, Italian artist (d. 1598)
- date unknown
  - Hayashi Narinaga, Japanese samurai (d. 1605)
  - Henry Howard, Earl of Surrey, English aristocrat (d. 1547)

== Deaths ==
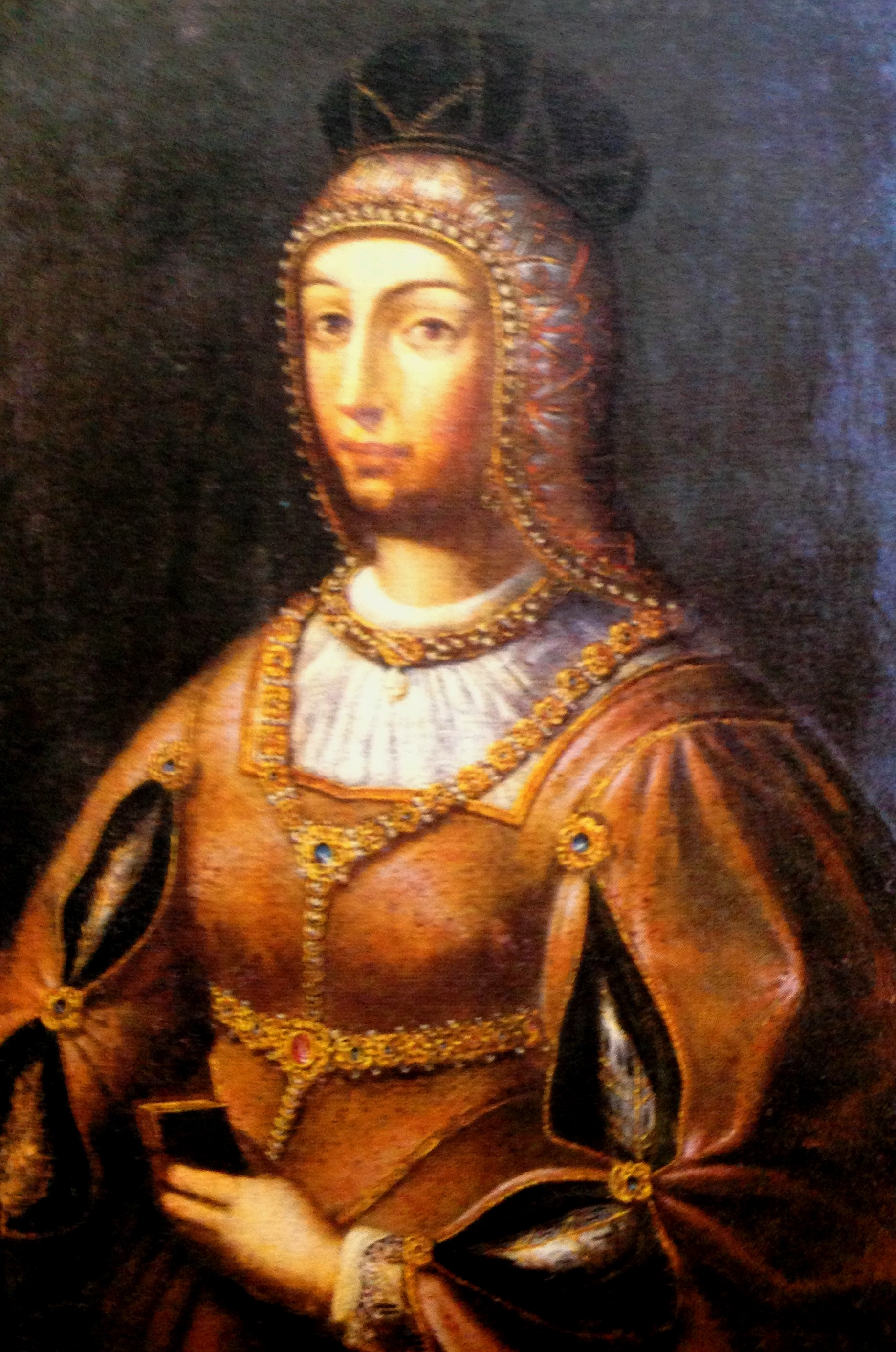
Maria of Aragon, Queen of Portugal

- January 5 – Francesco Raibolini, Italian painter (b. c. 1450)
- January 7 – Joanna of Aragon, Queen of Naples (b. 1454)
- January 22 – Hadım Sinan Pasha, Ottoman grand vizier (b. 1459)
- March 7 – Maria of Aragon, Queen of Portugal (b. 1482)
- March 26 – Heinrich Isaac, Flemish composer (b. c. 1450)
- April 14 – Tuman bay II, last Mamluk sultan of Egypt (b. c. 1476)
- June 19 – Luca Pacioli, Mathematician, collaborator with Leonardo da Vinci and 'father of accounting' (b. c. 1447)
- September 13 – Yunus Pasha, Grand Vizier of the Ottoman Empire
- September 21 – Dyveke Sigbritsdatter, mistress of Christian II of Denmark (b. 1490)
- September 24 – Frederick IV of Baden, Dutch bishop (b. 1455)
- October 31 – Fra Bartolomeo, Italian artist (b. 1472)
- November 6 – Wiguleus Fröschl of Marzoll, Bishop of Passau (1500–1517) (b. 1445)
- November 8 – Francisco Jiménez de Cisneros, Spanish Catholic cardinal and statesman (b. 1436)
- date unknown
  - Badi' al-Zaman, Timurid ruler of Herat
  - Francisco Hernández de Córdoba, Spanish conquistador
  - Marcus Musurus, Greek scholar and philosopher (b. 1470)
- probable
  - Gaspar van Weerbeke, Dutch composer (b. 1445)
