= Names of Okinawa =

Etymology of Okinawa and Ryukyu

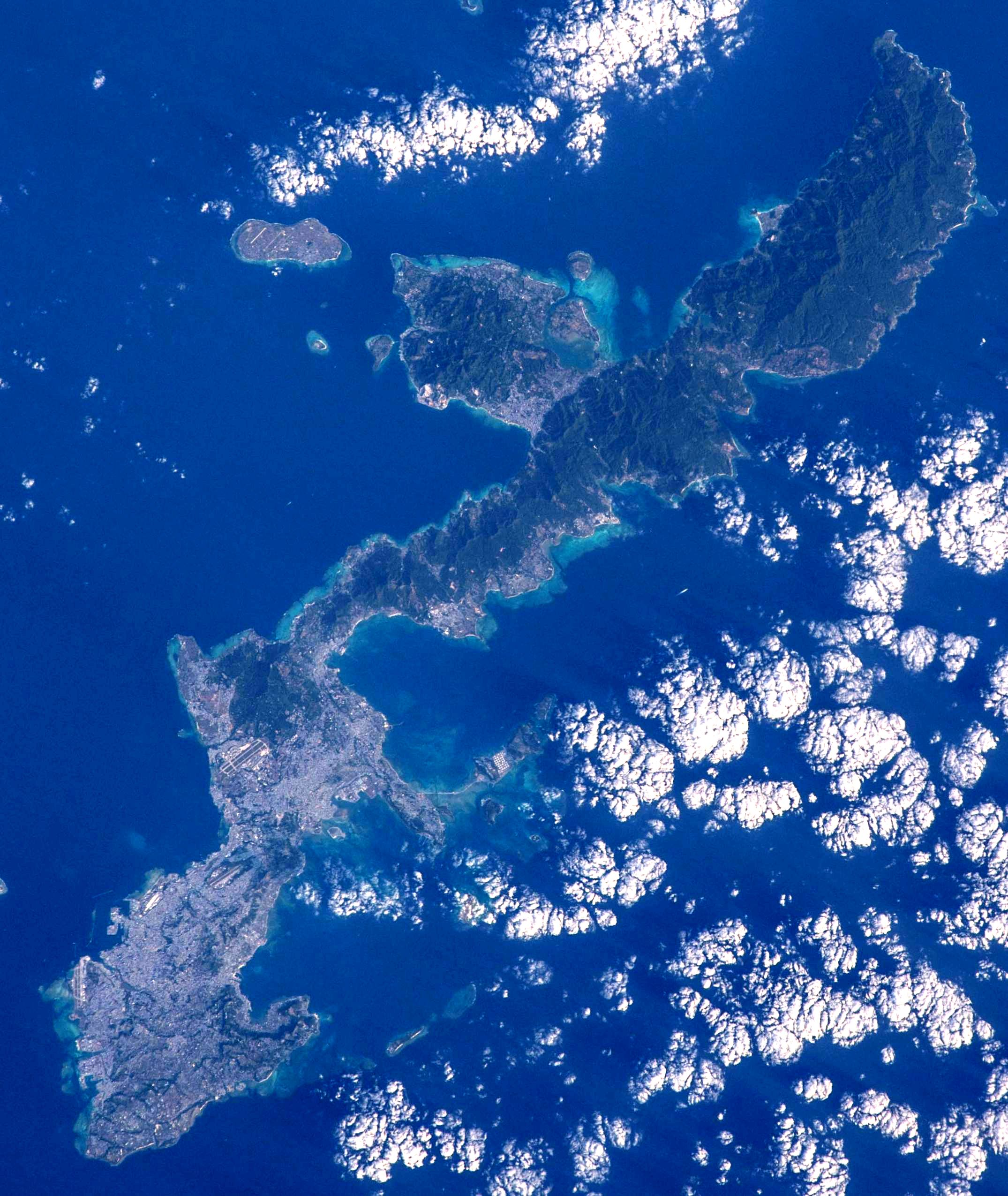
Okinawa Island

Okinawa (沖縄) is a name with multiple referents. The endonym refers to Okinawa Island in southwestern Japan. Today it can cover some surrounding islands (i.e., Okinawa Islands) and, more importantly, can refer to Okinawa Prefecture, a much larger administrative division of Japan, although the people from the Miyako and Yaeyama Islands still feel a strong sense of otherness to Okinawa.

A related term, Ryūkyū (琉球), also has multiple semantic domains. It was a name for an Okinawa-centered kingdom before it was replaced with Okinawa Prefecture in 1879. Ryūkyū was an exonym for Okinawa Island and remained largely alien to the native populations. Westerners have used the word for a larger chain of islands (the Ryukyu Islands, or the Ryukyus), for which the native populations have no folkloristic term. Detached from the native populations' perception, the Western usage became mainstream in multiple disciplines of natural sciences although there remains a non-negligible disagreement over the exact extent of the un-Ryukyuan term.

== Okinawa ==
=== Okinawa Island ===
The first known possible reference to Okinawa can be found in the Tō Dai-wajō Tōsei-den (779), a biography of Chinese Buddhist monk Jianzhen written by Ōmi no Mifune. Jianzhen and a Japanese embassy to Tang China accidentally stopped over the Southern Islands during their travel to Japan in 753. One of the islands mentioned in the book was A-ko-na-ha (阿児奈波), which the book stated was located southwest of Tanegashima. A-ko-na-ha is usually identified as Okinawa Island. However, this identification is not without a problem as the biography suggested that Jianzhen's ship had spent only one day to travel from A-ko-na-ha to Yakushima, which is about 500 km away from Okinawa Island. Before the famous voyage, the Japanese imperial court had dispatched several expeditions to the Southern Islands but for unknown reasons, the name of Okinawa was absent from the records.

The hiragana spelling おきなは was first attested in the Nagato Manuscript of the Tale of the Heike (circa 1300). A Muromachi-period document dated 1404 mentioned an Okinau ship (をきなう船), which was dispatched by the Okinawa-based kingdom of Ryūkyū to pay tribute to the Ashikaga shogunate.

The Okinawa-based kingdom of Ryūkyū referred to their island as Okinawa for numerous occasions. The Yarazamori Gusuku Inscription (1554) associates Okinawa (おきなは) with the earth under the king (天下). The Omoro Sōshi, a compilation of archaic ritual songs, contains a dozen of songs referring to Okinawa (おきなわ and おきにや). The small polity used a predominantly kana writing style before switching to conventional sōrō-style Written Japanese as a result of the conquest by Satsuma Domain in 1609.

Kanji logographs assigned to Okinawa have changed over time. Following the conquest in 1609, Satsuma conducted land surveys, gradually standardizing Kanji assigned to Okinawan toponyms. A common spelling before and immediately after the conquest was the inauspicious-looking 悪鬼納 (the first two characters mean evil demon), but Satsuma started using the current spelling 沖縄 as early as the 1620s. This spelling was popularized in mainland Japan by the Nantōshi (1719). Its author Arai Hakuseki was likely to have consulted a map of Okinawa Island submitted to the Tokugawa Shogunate by Satsuma Domain in 1702.

The Shuri-Naha Okinawan form of Okinawa is ʔucinaa. The raising of the vowel /o/ to /u/ was a pan-Ryukyuan areal phenomenon while the palatalization of /k/ to /c/ [tɕ] before /i/ was a relatively recent change with a much geographically limited distribution. Most Northern Okinawan varieties resist this change. Even among South-Central varieties, Itoman, Komesu, Ōyama, and Tsuken Island varieties remain unaffected. For its conservativeness, the Standard Japanese form is effectively undoing historical sound changes.

=== Okinawa Islands ===
Adopting Western practices, the Japanese government started naming large groups of islands in the early Meiji period. The Nantō Suiro-shi (1873), the first coast pilot of the Nansei Islands published by the Hydrographic Office of the Imperial Japanese Navy, is credited for coining the name Okinawa Shotō (沖縄諸島, literally, Okinawa Islands). Its author, Captain Yanagi Narayoshi, initially consulted the British China Pilot forth edition (1864). Dissatisfied with a mixture of European, Chinese, and Japanese names in the European charts, he decided to give Japanese names to Japanese islands. According to Yanagi's classification, the Okinawa Shotō had smaller geographical extents than the modern Okinawa Islands as the Okinawa Shotō, the Kerama Shotō, and the Iheya Shotō constituted the Ryūkyū Guntō (literally, Ryūkyū Group). The name of Ryūkyū Guntō was replaced by Okinawa Guntō (沖縄群島) in 1883, and thereafter, the name of Okinawa Guntō has been used without interruption by the Hydrographic Office of the Imperial Japanese Navy and its successor, the Hydrographic and Oceanographic Department of the Japan Coast Guard.

The Hydrographic and Oceanographic Department of the Japan Coast Guard is not the sole government organ that defines official geographical names of Japan. The Geospatial Information Authority of Japan (GSI), a subsidiary agency of the Ministry of Land, Infrastructure, Transport and Tourism, provides administratively-oriented names. A geographical area that roughly corresponds to the Okinawa Guntō is referred to as Okinawa Shotō by the GSI. The two government organs are working on standardizing the names for large geographical entities and their extents.

The geographical extent of the Okinawa Islands coincides with those of some taxonomic units proposed in a variety of humanities disciplines. For example, Okinawan is a subgroup of Northern Ryukyuan (Amami–Okinawan) languages, with the other subgroup being Amami. The speakers of the Okinawan subgroup concentrate in the Okinawa Islands if modern emigrants are not counted. While some propose a hypothetical subgrouping of Southern Amami–Northern Okinawan and thereby reject the unity of Okinawan, Pellard (2015) re-evaluates the traditional two-way division from a novel phylogenetic point of view. To complicate matters, the third edition of the UNESCO Atlas of the World's Languages in Danger of Extinction (2009) unilaterally gave the name of Okinawan to a dialect cluster occupying the "central and southern parts of Okinawa Island and neighbouring islands". In the linguistic literature, however, this subgroup is commonly known as Central Okinawan, South–Central Okinawan, or South Okinawan.

These abstract geographical entities were recognized independently of the local populations. In fact, people of Kume Island, which is part of the Okinawa Islands, maintain a strong notion that they are not Okinawans.

=== Okinawa Prefecture ===
The geographical extent of Okinawa was expanded in a similar manner when the Japanese Empire annexed the Ryukyu Kingdom and established Okinawa Prefecture in 1879. The Meiji government generally avoided retaining the names of old provinces and instead named new first-class administrative divisions after cities or districts where the administration offices were located. For some reason, however, the southwesternmost prefecture of the empire was named after an island. Both contemporary and modern scholars speculate that the Meiji government disfavored the name of Ryūkyū for its Chinese origin because it remained cautious about China's territorial ambitions in Okinawa.

With the modern prefecture, the semantic domain of Okinawa has extended to Okinawa's southern neighbors, the Miyako and Yaeyama Islands, which are collectively referred to by the Okinawa-centric name of the Sakishima Islands. There is an asymmetry in the process of embracing this new notion in daily life. On the one hand, people on Okinawa Island, younger generations in particular, tend to take it for granted that Okinawa (including its dialectal form ʔucinaa) covers the Yaeyamas. On the other hand, people on Ishigaki Island of the Yaeyama Islands maintains the traditional dichotomy of Okinawa (ʔukïnaː) and Yaeyama (jaima), and therefore feel a clear sense of otherness to Okinawa. The same holds true for the Miyako Islands. Nevertheless, Okinawa Prefecture has been there for generations, and young people in the Yaeyamas are developing the notion that they belong to Okinawa although it remains completely natural to say "go to Okinawa" when they fly from Ishigaki to Naha.

== Ryūkyū ==
=== The un-Ryukyuan nature of Ryūkyū ===
Ryūkyū is a rare word, if any, in Ryukyuan languages. In fact, it is not uncommon that a dictionary or glossary of a Ryukyuan language has no entry for Ryūkyū. Even for the male samurai register of Shuri Okinawan, Shimabukuro Seibin (1890–1970) explained the word ruucuu (the Shuri speech form) in the Okinawa-go Jiten (1963) as follows:

外国人に国籍を問われたときにruucuuと答える習慣になっていた。沖縄人同士では用いなかった。

It was customary to give ruucuu as the answer when foreigners asked about the nationality. Not used among Okinawans.

— Okinawa-gō jiten (1963)

Ironically, Ryūkyū sounds very un-Ryukyuan. The prohibition of word-initial /r/ is an areal feature that is not limited to Ryukyuan but to Altaic languages, which cover wide areas of Eurasia. In fact, Ryūkyū is an exonym recorded by the Chinese. The fact that the Chinese characters assigned to Liuqiu have changed over time (流求, 留仇, 流虬, 瑠求, 琉球, etc.) indicates that it was borrowed in turn from some non-Chinese language. Because Ryukyuan is unlikely to be the donor of the un-Ryukyuan word, most scholars seek its etymological root in Austronesian languages of Taiwan.

It was only an accident of history that Ryūkyū came to point to Okinawa Island. Chinese Liuqiu was first attested in the Book of Sui (636), which stated that Sui China had sent expeditions to what it called Liuqiu (流求) three times in 607 and 608. The fragmentary and apparently inconsistent description in the Book of Sui is the source of a never-ending scholarly debate over what was referred to by Liuqiu: Taiwan, Okinawa Island or both. Chinese records written during the Mongol Yuan dynasty suggested that Liuqiu was Taiwan. For example, the Wenxian Tongkao (1317) stated that Liuqiu was located to the east of Quanzhou, a port city facing the Taiwan Strait, and was visible from the Penghu Islands in the middle of the strait. Similarly, the History of Yuan (1369), which was compiled by the succeeding Ming dynasty, reinforces the identification of Liuqiu as Taiwan. According to the book, the Mongol Empire tried in vain to subjugate what it called Liuqiu (瑠求) twice in 1292 and 1297. The Penghu Islands and Liuqiu faced each other and the envoys of 1292 visited Penghu en route to Liuqiu.

In 1372, the newly established Ming China sent an envoy to Okinawa Island. Satto, one of the local rulers of the island, was given the title of King of Chūzan of the State of Ryūkyū (琉球国中山王). Historian Ikeya Machiko speculates that receiving tributes from Liuqiu was of great symbolic significance in Ming Chinese domestic politics because Liuqiu was known to have repelled the Mongol khans' attempts of subjugation. In reality, however, Ming China appears to have been aware of the fact that what it called Liuqiu was different from what the Mongol khans failed to conquer. Thereafter the Chinese distinguished Okinawa Island from Taiwan by referring to the former by Great Liuqiu (大琉球), as opposed to Little Liuqiu (小琉球). In few centuries, the Chinese ceased the use of Little Liuqiu, replacing it with Dongfan, Beigang, and Keelung before Taiwan became the standard name for the much larger island.

The early Chinese narratives on Liuqiu, such as that in the Book of Sui, shaped the Japanese perception of Ryūkyū that lasted for a long time. Ryūkyū was considered to be a land of man-eating demons and thus one of the greatest fears of Japanese Buddhist monks sailing to China. The first known Japanese use of the word was of 803, when Buddhist monk Kūkai sent a letter to a Chinese official. Kūkai stated that during a voyage to China, Kūkai and others "had lost their courage at the thought of the tiger-like nature of (the people of) Ryūkyū" (失膽留求之虎性). Similarly, Enchin drifted to what he believed to be Ryūkyū during his voyage to Tang China in 853. He later described Ryūkyū as the land of cannibals (所謂流捄国喫人之地). Even as late as 1244, the Buddhist monk Keisei recorded the same perception in the Hyōtō Ryūkyū-koku ki.

=== Ryukyu Kingdom on Okinawa Island ===
The Okinawans embraced the fact that their land was somewhat accidentally labeled as Ryūkyū by the Chinese. In diplomatic correspondence with China and countries under the Chinese world order such as Korea, the "king" styled himself as King of Chūzan of the State of Ryūkyū in Classical Chinese. The king seems to have proclaimed himself to be the yo-no-nushi of the State of Ryūkyū (りうきう国のよのぬし) in a letter to the Ashikaga shōgun, as this phrase is attested in the shogun's reply to the now-lost letter. Ryūkyū can also be found in some stone inscriptions found on Okinawa Island. However, the un-Ryukyuan word remained alien to the Okinawans. There is no wonder that no single instance of Ryūkyū can be found in the ritual songs in the 22 volumes of the Omoro Sōshi, which reflects the Okinawan world-view.

Over the course of centuries, the Okinawa-centered polity gradually expanded its sphere of influence to the north and to the south. In the second half of the 15th century, the kings themselves led military campaigns against Amami Ōshima and Kikai Island of the Amami Islands. Ryūkyū tightened control of the islands in the north after a major armed revolt on Amami Ōshima in 1537. As a result of Satsuma's conquest of Ryūkyū in 1609, however, the Amami Islands was ceded to Satsuma and have since then shared a much longer history with Satsuma than with Okinawa. As for the southern neighbors, local rulers of the Miyako and Yaeyama Islands are said to initiate contact with Ryūkyū at the end of the 14th century. In 1500, a military conflict among local rulers of the two island groups provoked a large armed intervention from Ryūkyū. Nevertheless, the relationship between Ryūkyū and the remote islands was only loosely maintained by tribute-paying local rulers. The situation changed after Satsuma's conquest of Ryūkyū in 1609. As an early modern polity, Satsuma introduced to Ryūkyū the system of controlling people within a strictly delimited territory. The Miyako and Yaeyama Islands were formally recognized as the heritable properties of the king (or the provincial governor as Satsuma called the king for decades following the conquest), and people there suffered from poll tax imposed by the Okinawan polity.

Ryūkyū's territorial expansion, however, did not remove the word's prototypical association with Okinawa Island. The association remained particularly strong for Chinese Liuqiu. Since the Shi Liuqiu lu (1535), several memoirs of Chinese envoys to Ryūkyū have recorded glossaries of Okinawan words and phrases, where Chinese Liuqiu was routinely translated as Okinawa. For example, Liuqiu ren (琉球人) was translated as Okinawa hito (*okina(ː) pit͡ɕu, 倭急拿必周). Chinese envoys to Ryūkyū used the expression "arrive at Ryūkyū" (至琉球) only when they landed at the port of Naha or entered the Shuri Castle. They sometimes visited Kume Island on the route to wait for favorable wind conditions, but they did not utter the phrase there even though they knew that Kume Island was under the rule of Ryūkyū.

The Kagoshima Japanese form of Ryūkyū is Jiki. As Ryūkyū's suzerain, Satsuma Domain had heavy financial reliance on brown sugar production in Amami and Ryūkyū. For this reason, Jiki metonymically refers to black sugar in Kagoshima Prefecture. The Okinawans found derogatory nuances in the word Jiki-jin (literally, Ryūkyū person/people, i.e., Okinawan people).

Ryukyu Kingdom was replaced with Okinawa Prefecture in 1879. In the view point of Okinawans, Ryūkyū is an entity that no longer exists and accordingly there is no such group called "Ryukyuan people" today.

=== The Ryukyu Islands and the Western origin of the concept ===
The Kitab al-Fawa'id fi Usul 'Ilm al-Bahr wa 'l-Qawa'id (circa 1490) by the Arab navigator Ahmad ibn Mājid is the first known source outside the Sinosphere that mentions Ryūkyū. According to the Arabic book, Likīwū was a Jawi name for an island called al-Ghūr (الغور). Its association with iron, iron blades, and an antagonism toward China points to mainland Japan, rather than to Okinawa Island, however. In the Minhaj al-Fahir, Ibn Majid's student Sulayman al-Mahri made a similar reference to jazīrat Likyū (literally, Ryūkyū Island) as an alias of al-Ghūr. The Arabic term al-Ghūr appears to point to Chinese Luoji (落漈), an imaginary area in the sea east of China. The Chinese believed that sea water fell at Luoji and thereby that the sea level was kept constant despite the endless flow of river water into the sea. In Chinese narratives, Luoji was associated with Ryūkyū and the sea route to Okinawa Island.

Through contact with Muslim merchants, the Portuguese learned that people called Gores visited Southeast Asian ports for trade. The first known Western reference to Gores was from Malacca in 1510, a year before the conquest of the port city by Afonso de Albuquerque. The Portuguese demonym apparently derived from Arabic al-Ghūr. In few years, Gores came to be associated with another name, Lequios or Lequeos. The Commentarios do Grande Affonso d'Alboquerque (1557) used a rare derived form Lequea as the name of their country.

Early Portuguese sources were consistent with the Chinese view in that they considered the land of the Lequeos to be an island (ilha, singular). The Suma Oriental (circa 1515) by Tomé Pires was a prime example of this perception. After Fernão Pires de Andrade's expedition to Ming China from 1517 to 1518, Ryūkyū came to be described as islands (ilhas, plural). The term os Lequeos can be found in Vasco Calvo's letter (circa 1536). In Portuguese (and in English), a definite article plus the plural form of a toponym can refer to a group of islands, a construction that has no equivalent in East Asian languages.

The so-called Biblioteca Vallicelliana map (circa 1550) was the first map that shows the label Ryūkyū. Reflecting Ming Chinese terminology, the map depicts a chain of islands in which the captions lequio menor (Little Ryūkyū, i.e., Taiwan), lequio maior (Great Ryūkyū, i.e., Okinawa Island), and japan are given from the southwest to the northeast. A large caption LEQVIOS is attached to the island chain. The combination of the three names can be found in a report written by the Spanish monk Martín de Rada in the 1570s: leuqiu el menor, leuqiu el grande, and los lequios (plural).

Adopting Western practices, Japanese technocrats and academicians chose the Sino-Japanese term shotō (諸島) to explicitly mark the plurality of islands. A related term guntō (群島) was used in place of English group. The Japanese government assigned hierarchically organized names to the southwestern islands of Japan. These names had been standardized toward the end of the 19th century. The top-level entity that covers the (nearly) entire island chain between Kyushu and Taiwan is the Nansei Shotō (南西諸島, literally, Southwestern Islands). For the subgroups of the Nansei Shotō, however, there remained disagreements between the Hydrographic and Oceanographic Department of the Japan Coast Guard and the Geospatial Information Authority of Japan (GSI). The former provided a flatter organization:

- Nansei Shotō (南西諸島)
  - Ōsumi Guntō (大隅群島)
  - Tokara Rettō (吐噶喇列島)
  - Amami Guntō, (奄美群島), which include Iōtorishima
  - Okinawa Guntō (沖縄群島)
  - Sakishima Shotō, (先島諸島) which covers the Senkaku Islands
  - Daitō Shotō (大東諸島)

On the other hand, the GSI defined a deeper hierarchy:

- Nansei Shotō (南西諸島)
  - Satsunan Shotō (薩南諸島)
    - Ōsumi Guntō (大隅諸島)
    - Tokara Rettō (吐噶喇列島)
    - Amami Shotō (奄美諸島)
  - Ryūkyū Shotō (琉球諸島)
    - Iōtorishima
    - Okinawa Shotō (沖縄諸島)
    - Sakishima Shotō, (先島諸島)
    - Senkaku Shotō (尖閣諸島)

According to the GSI's definition, the Ryūkyū Shotō covers Okinawa Prefecture except the outlying Daitō Islands. The two government organs have worked on resolving disagreements. As a result, the Satsunan Shotō and Ryūkyū Shotō among many others are recognized as the standard geographical names of Japan. As a member of the International Hydrographic Organization, Japan uses these geographical names for the International (INT) Charts it produces.

The name of the Ryukyu Islands became a politically sensitive matter after World War II because the U.S. separated from Japan what it called the Ryukyu Islands. The U.S. Armed Forces harbored the divide-and-rule policy during the war while the State Department maintained that the Ryukyu Islands shall remain under the sovereignty of Japan. The State Department defined the Ryukyu Islands as the Amami, Okinawa, Sakishima, and Daitō Islands. The U.S. military, on the other hand, had obscure and inconsistent understandings of the geographical extent of the American concept. The Civil Affairs Handbook: Ryukyu (Loochoo) Islands (1944), for example, treated the Ryukyu Islands as a much wider area extending not only to the Tokara and Ōsumi Islands but also to the Uji and Koshikijima Islands, which are not even part of the Nansei Islands. When the U.S. first publicized its intention to separate the Ryukyu Islands from Japan in 1946, it set the boundary at the 30th parallel north, which in fact crossed the northern tip of Kuchinoshima, the northernmost inhabited island of the Tokara Islands. The procrustean boundary had its root in the wartime boundary between the areas of operation of the Sixth and Tenth Armies. The area under separate military occupation had shrunk since then. The Tokara Islands were returned to Japanese administration in 1952, which was followed by the Amami Islands in 1953. Okinawa was finally returned to Japan in 1972. The Treaty of San Francisco (1951) further illustrates the complexities surrounding the name Ryukyu Islands. In its draft, the U.S. used the phrase "The Ryukyu Islands south of 29° north latitude", but the Japanese government requested twice to replace it with "Nansei Islands south of 29° north latitude", arguing that the Amami island group did not belong to the Ryukyu Islands (i.e., Ryūkyū Shotō) but to the Satsunan Islands. As a political compromise, the final version adopted the redundant phrase "Nansei Shoto south of 29° north latitude (including the Ryukyu Islands and the Daito Islands)". For some reason, the CIA World Factbook still ignores standardized geographical names of Japan and attaches the non-standard label "RYUKYU ISLANDS" on the map of Japan.

The U.S. military imagined a Ryukyuan nation. Although it never allocated sufficient resources to achieve this goal, it even tried in vain to create a national flag and a national anthem. However, the Okinawan view toward the U.S. military occupation critically worsened as it confiscated their ancestral lands with bulldozers and bayonets and turned them into semi-permanent military bases. The American concept of the Ryukyu Islands was translated into Japanese as Ryūkyū Rettō (琉球列島), to which the Japanese government did not give a definition. The term Ryūkyū Shotō was avoided probably because the Amami Islands and the Daitō Islands lay outside the officially defined geographical extent of the Ryūkyū Shotō. The U.S. military assigned the name of Ryukyu to the entities it created. For example, the first university on Okinawa Island was named the University of the Ryukyus, which was given the Japanese name of Ryūkyū Daigaku (琉球大学). By contrast, entities created by Okinawans themselves tended to bear the name of Okinawa. The umbrella organization of the Okinawa reversion movement was named Okinawa-ken sokoku fukki kyōgikai (沖縄県祖国復帰協議会, literally, Okinawa Prefecture Council for Reversion to the Home Country). Thanks to the humiliating military occupation, Ryūkyū became loaded with negative connotations among Okinawans.

Okinawa's northern neighbor, the Amami Islands, resisted much more strongly against the U.S. military's move to sever their centuries-old ties to mainland Japan and to annex them to what the Americans called the Ryukyus. At the early stage of military occupation, the U.S. military imposed the label Northern Ryukyu on the Amami Islands. While the people of Amami had no power to prevent the occupiers from using the English name, they expressed resistance by translating the much-hated term as Hokubu Nansei Shotō (literally, Northern Nansei Islands) in Japanese. A bitter memory of the U.S. military occupation strengthened the notion that the Amami Islanders were distinct from Okinawans. Even today, they occasionally voice opposition toward attempts to impose the label Ryūkyū on them.

=== Ryukyu in natural sciences ===
Some disciplines of natural sciences such as biology and geology have developed a distinctive notion of Ryukyu that does not align well with administrative or ethnolinguistic boundaries. After examining inconsistent and mutually conflicting uses of Ryukyu-related geographical names in the literature, Toyama (2014) proposed the following guidelines for natural sciences:

- Ryukyu Archipelago for the Nansei Islands, which covers the Senkaku and Daitō Islands,
- Ryukyu Islands for a narrower chain of islands between Kyushu and Taiwan, excluding the outlying Senkaku and Daitō Islands, and
- Three-way division of the Ryukyu Islands: the Northern Ryukyus, the Central Ryukyus, and the Southern Ryukyus.

Watase's Line, the boundary between the Northern and Central Ryukyus, is drawn between Akusekijima and Kodakarajima of the Tokara Islands. Hachisuka's Line, or the Kerama Gap, marks the boundary between the Central and Southern Ryukyus.

The notion of Ryukyu in natural sciences deviates nonnegligibly from that of humanities. In humanities, the label Ryukyuan is used as a conventional umbrella term for an ethnolinguistic supergroup who occupies the Amami, Okinawa, Miyako, and Yaeyama Islands. In other words, the Ōsumi and Tokara Islands are by no means Ryukyuan because ethnolinguistically speaking, they clearly belong to Southern Kyushu. To further complicate matters, the Central Ryukyus do not exactly match the Amami and Okinawa Islands because they are extended further north to cover the two inhabited islands of Kodakarajima and Takarajima of the Tokara Islands. Natural scientists maintain tension with the Japanese government, according to which the Ryūkyū Shotō encompass the Okinawa Shotō, the Sakishimau Shotō, and the Senkaku Shotō. The three-way division of natural sciences is disharmonious with the two-way administrative division of Kagoshima and Okinawa Prefectures.

People on the island chain rarely voice their opinions about academic activities as they are quite remote from the discourse and knowledge of daily life. When they come to interfere with daily activities, however, strong oppositions to the label Ryūkyū emerge. For example, the World Natural Heritage site of Amami-Ōshima Island, Tokunoshima Island, northern part of Okinawa Island, and Iriomote Island was initially given the name of Ryūkyū Shotō when a panel of natural science experts decided to add the patchy group of islands to the tentative list of nomination in 2013. However, the Amami Islands and Kagoshima Prefecture as a whole strongly opposed the label of Ryūkyū being imposed on them. As a result, the candidate site was renamed Amami–Ryukyu before it was renamed again to the current, more descriptive name in 2017.

=== Ryūkyū as a tourism brand of Okinawa Prefecture in the Japanese market ===
Ryūkyū has a deep connection to the mainland Japanese gaze. Ryūkyū's association with cannibalism had been long forgotten before the beginning of the Edo period. The image of Ryūkyū in mainland Japan was primarily shaped by Ryūkyū's missions to Edo, which were intentionally alienized by Satsuma to portray Satsuma Domain and the Tokugawa shogunate as multiethnic superpowers. For its phonetic similarity, Ryūkyū was associated with Ryūgū, the undersea dragon palace from fairy tales. A romanticized view of Ryūkyū can be found in Takizawa Bakin's historical fiction Chinsetsu Yumiharizuki (1807–1811), in which Minamoto no Tametomo drifted to Ryūkyū and founded a kingdom there. The un-Japanese (and in fact un-Ryukyuan) word aroused exoticism.

Modernization offered opportunities for mainland Japanese tourists to visit Okinawa Island. Shimabukuro Gen'ichirō (1885–1942), an educator from Northern Okinawa, took a key role as a tour guide for mainland Japanese intelligentsia while simultaneously enlightening fellow Okinawans. His narrative reflected the duality of Ryūkyū. On the one hand, Shimabukuro went along with the tourist gaze, exploiting the exotic notion of Ryūkyū. On the other hand, Shimabukuro urged mainland tourists not to use Ryūkyū because people felt insulted to be referred to by the exonym of Chinese origin. He recommended the autonym Okinawa instead.

Ryūkyū was given a new role after the U.S. returned Okinawa Prefecture to Japan in 1972. The reversion triggered an economic boom, but the end of Expo '75 was followed by a recession on Okinawa Island. To reactivate tourism, Dentsu, the largest public relations agency in Japan, proposed, among others, to exploit the unique history of Okinawa as a new tourism resource. Dentsu stressed a need to relativize the tragic Battle of Okinawa in 1945. Because soldiers from across mainland Japan perished on Okinawa Island, bereaved family members had accounted for a substantial portion of Japanese tourists. To overcome the negative image about Okinawa, Dentsu proposed to promote a positive image of the long history of Ryūkyū. Dentsu also urged to raise awareness about the positive view of Okinawan history and culture among people of Okinawa Prefecture because it worried about possible discord between the tourism sector and the rest of the population.

Okinawa Prefecture has followed the plan orchestrated by the PR agency. The historian Takara Kurayoshi (b. 1947) played an important role in promoting a romanticized view of the Ryukyu Kingdom. He supervised a historical drama television series titled Ryūkyū no Kaze (1993), which was broadcast nationwide by NHK. With decades of promotion, Okinawan people have internalized the mainland Japanese gaze to some degree. The Okinawan punk rock band Mongol800 released a song titled Ryūkyū aika (琉球愛歌) in 2001, where Ryūkyū was used as an apparatus of dissimilation. It was associated with a new stereotypical view of Okinawa: living in peace and in good harmony with nature.

== Uruma ==
Uruma is a poetic name for Okinawa Island. A city in central Okinawa took this name when it was formed by merging several municipalities in 2005. Some try to interpret the word as an Okinawan compound (uru (fine sand or coral) and -ma (a common suffix for an island name)). However, it is clearly of mainland Japanese origin. In fact, this word is completely absent from Okinawan ryūka poems/songs, and its usage is limited to waka poems, which were composed by Okinawan ruling elites.

The first known reference to Uruma is a waka poem by an Heian-period aristocrat named Fujiwara no Kintō in the early 11th century. He compared a woman's coldheartedness to the incomprehensible speech of drifters from Ureung Island (迂陵島, identified as Ulleung Island) of Goryeo Kingdom. However, the association with Ulleung Island was soon forgotten because the reference to Goryeo (anachronistically called Silla by Kintō) was dropped when his poem was recorded in the Senzai Wakashū (1188). Thereafter waka poets treated Uruma simply as an island somewhere outside of Japan with an unintelligible language. At the same time, it evoked a sense of familiarity because the phrase Uruma no ichi (market in Uruma) was poetically associated with Mino Province in central Japan.

From the viewpoint of mainland Japanese poets, Okinawa Island might have been an ideal referent of Uruma because, despite the exotic name of Ryūkyū, the first reference to Okinawan composed waka poems was as early as 1496. The first known identification of uruma as Okinawa Island can be found in the Moshiogusa (1513), but the association remained weak for some time. For example, Hokkaido, in addition to Okinawa Island, was referred to as Uruma in the Shōzaishū (1597). The mainland Japanese poetic practice was adopted by Okinawan waka poets in the late 17th century. The Omoidegusa (1700), a purely Japanese poetic diary by Shikina Seimei, is known for its extensive use of the word uruma.

== Naha ==
Okinawa's northern neighbor, the Amami Islands, has the tradition of calling Okinawa Naha, the main port town of Okinawa Island and the capital of Okinawa Prefecture. For example, people of Okinoerabu Island use Nafa for Okinawa and Nafanchu for Okinawan people. They are less conscious about the distinction between Okinawa Island and Okinawa Prefecture. The Okinawan word for Okinawans, Uchinaanchu, is known to them, but they never identify themselves as Okinawans. Their autonym is Erabunchu. Like Okinawans, the people of the Amami Islands have no folkloristic term that covers both the Amami people and Okinawans.

The Standard Japanese word, Okinawa, is borrowed into the languages of the Amami Islands. It is steadily replacing Naha.

== Links ==
- Map of Ryūkyū-koku (1702), submitted to the Tokugawa Shogunate by Satsuma Domain
