= Japan voyage =

Trade route

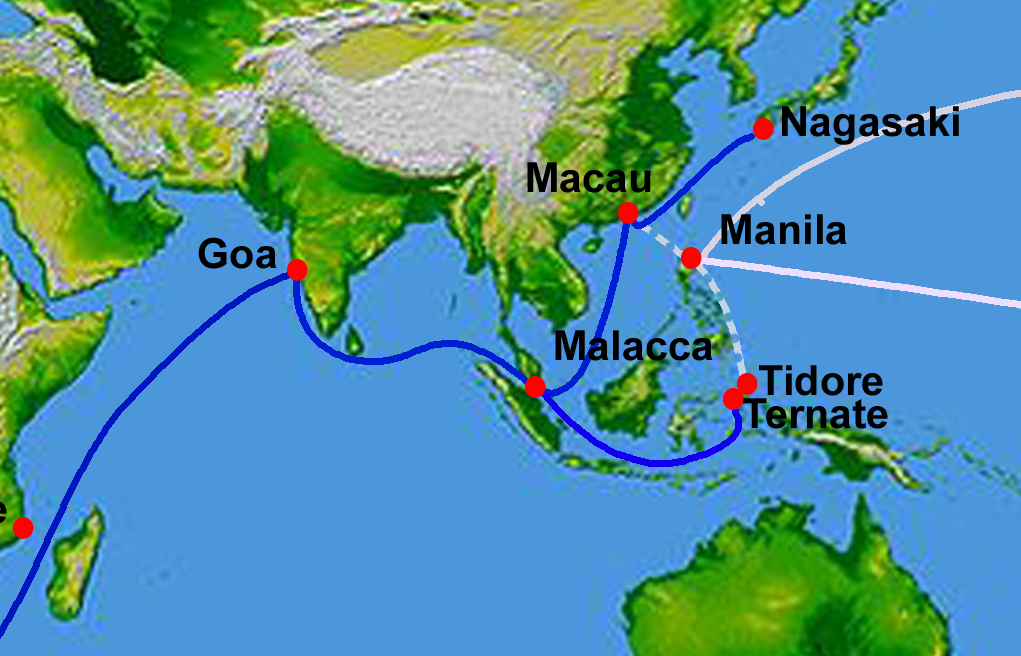
Japan voyage, Portuguese trade route linking Goa to Nagasaki (blue) and Spanish routes (white)

The Japan voyage (viagem do Japão in Portuguese) was a trade route established by the Portuguese from 1550 to 1639, linking Goa, then capital of the Portuguese India, to Japan. This lucrative annual trip was carried out under monopoly of the Portuguese crown, and was in charge of a captain general. The charge of captain general of the Japan trip was officially attributed by the governor of Portuguese India as a reward for services rendered. The large ships involved in this trade were referred to as the nau do trato, the silver ships, China's ships, and became known among the Japanese as kurofune, a term that came to be used to name all Western ships that supplied in Japan during the Edo period.

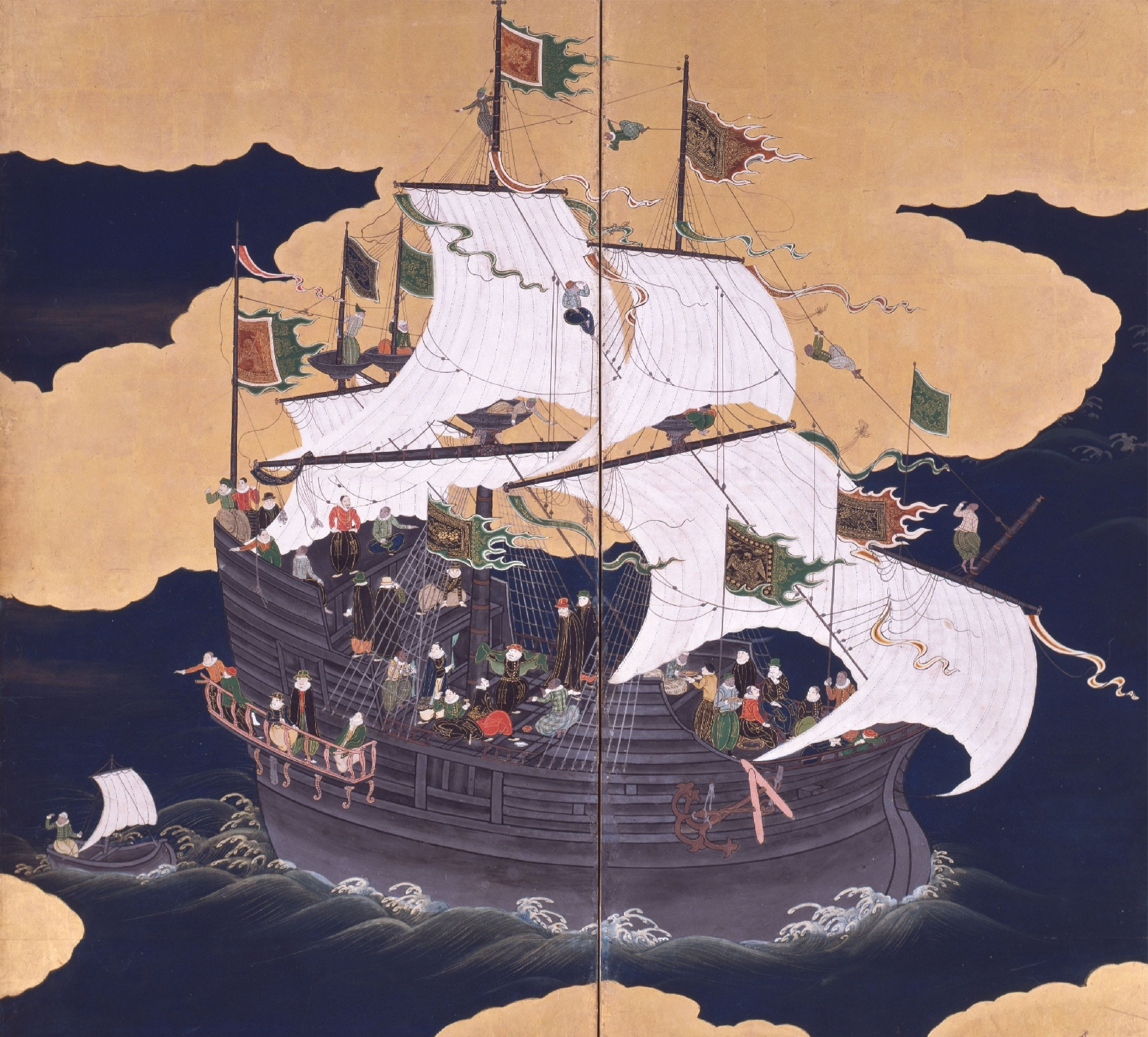
A Portuguese Black Ship in Nagasaki. Japanese Nanban art screen, XVII century

Upon arriving in Japan in 1543, Portuguese merchants and adventurers engaged in a profitable trade on the island of Kyushu, on their own ships and Chinese reeds, without a stable port. Because of a ban on the relations between China and Japan, they acted as intermediaries. In 1550, the importance of this trade led to the creation of an annual trip under the monopoly of the Portuguese Crown. To this end, a chief captain was appointed. This was a coveted position assigned by the official authorities as a reward for services rendered. The right to carry on the "Japan voyage" was donated by the local Crown entities such as the city of Macau, Kochi, Malacca. Later, it was auctioned in Goa to the highest bidder.

Given the long distance between Goa and Japan, the route initially departed from Malacca. After several attempts to create an intermediate stop in China, in 1554 Leonel de Sousa, the chief captain of Japan's voyage, reached an agreement with Canton authorities to legalize the Portuguese trade, on condition of paying specially stipulated customs duties. From 1557, the Portuguese achieved the official establishment in Macau. The city became integrated in a triangular trade that finished in Japan. Then, in 1570, after an agreement with the local daimyō, they founded the city of Nagasaki. The ship sailed from Goa in April or May, loaded with fabrics, glass and glass objects, Flanders watches and Portuguese wines.

== See also ==
- Luso-Chinese agreement
- Nanban trade
- Santa Catarina (ship)
