= Luso-Chinese agreement =

1554 trade agreement between Portugal and China

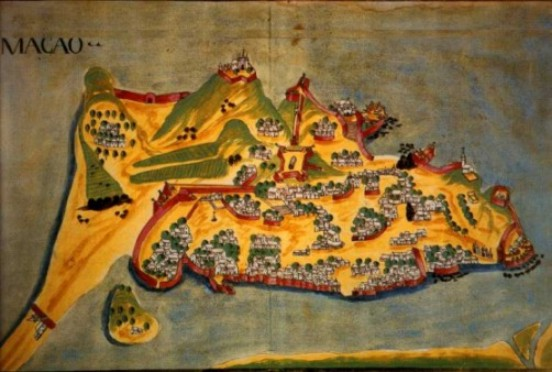
The peninsula of Macau in 1639

The Luso-Chinese agreement of 1554 (Portuguese: Acordo Luso-Chinês de 1554) was a trade agreement between the Portuguese headed by Leonel de Sousa, and the authorities of Guangzhou headed by the Provincial Admiral (海道副使; haitao in European sources) Wang Bo (汪柏), which allowed for the legalization of Portuguese trade in China by paying taxes. It opened a new era in Sino-Portuguese relations, as Portuguese were until then officially barred from trading in the region.

== Military conflicts ==
In 1517 an embassy led by Fernão Pires de Andrade to the Ming court failed. After several military conflicts in 1521 and 1522 failed to establish a foothold in China, trade was conducted as smuggling and was fought by the authorities, who considered the Portuguese to be "Folangji" (Frankish) pirates. Several Portuguese were captured at Shuangyu in 1548 near the Dongshan Peninsula and in 1549 where two Portuguese junks and Galeote Pereira were captured.

== Leonel de Sousa ==
The Portuguese later returned to China peacefully and presented themselves under the name Portuguese instead of Franks and rented Macau as a trading post from China by paying annual lease of hundreds of silver taels to Ming China. Leonel de Sousa, Captain-Major of the voyage to Japan, had reached the coast of Guangdong in 1552, where he learned that all foreigners could trade through the payment of taxes to the Chinese, except the "Folanji" including Portuguese, then considered as pirates. He then asked that they comply with the assumptions of peace and payment of taxes, pledging to change this "name".

In 1554, Leonel de Sousa made an agreement with Guangzhou's officials to legalize trade with the Portuguese, on condition of paying certain customs duties. The single surviving written evidence of this agreement is a letter from Leonel de Sousa to Infante Louis, King John III's brother, dated 1556, which states that the Portuguese undertook fee payments and were not erecting fortifications. The letter describes the protracted negotiations with the haitao Wang Bo, who was identified in Chinese sources as having accepted a bribe from the Portuguese to dry their cargo and pay taxes in Guangzhou. Both sides were available to find a solution, as the port of Guangzhou was also facing a depletion since it was closed to foreign trade. Leonel de Sousa tried to negotiate only 10% fees, which Wang Bo countered with the mandatory 20%, but focusing only on half the cargoes, to which Leonel de Sousa agreed. This treaty would be followed by the recognition of Macau as an official Portuguese warehouse in 1557. Leonel de Sousa became the second Captain-Major of Macau in 1558 (the equivalent of the later governor of Macau).

Chinese historical documents claim the Portuguese bribed corrupt local officials in Guangzhou to sign the agreement in private; however, Tan Shibao and Cao Guoqing argue that this is due to misinterpretation of sources, and the Ming government gave approval to how Wang Bo handled the agreement.

== See also ==
- China–Portugal relations
- Jorge Álvares, first Portuguese person to land in China, in 1513
- Rafael Perestrello, another early Portuguese explorer in China, arriving in 1516
