= Rafael Perestrello =

16th-century Portuguese trader and explorer

- Born: 15th century Kingdom of Portugal
- Died: 16th century Kingdom of Portugal
- Occupation: Explorer
- Known for: One of the first Europeans to reach China by sea during the Age of Discovery.

Rafael Perestrello (fl. 1514 – c. 1517) was a Portuguese explorer and a cousin of Filipa Moniz Perestrello, the wife of explorer Christopher Columbus. He is best known for landing on the southern shores of mainland China in 1516 and 1517 to trade in Guangzhou (then romanized as "Canton"), after the Portuguese explorer Jorge Álvares landed on Lintin Island within the Pearl River estuary in May 1513. Rafael also served as a trader and naval ship captain for the Portuguese in Sumatra and Portuguese-conquered Malacca.

João de Barros (1496–1570) wrote that Rafael Perestrello almost became lost while sailing by the Andaman Islands, but ventured safely through territory that was rumored to be inhabited by native cannibals.

== Family background ==
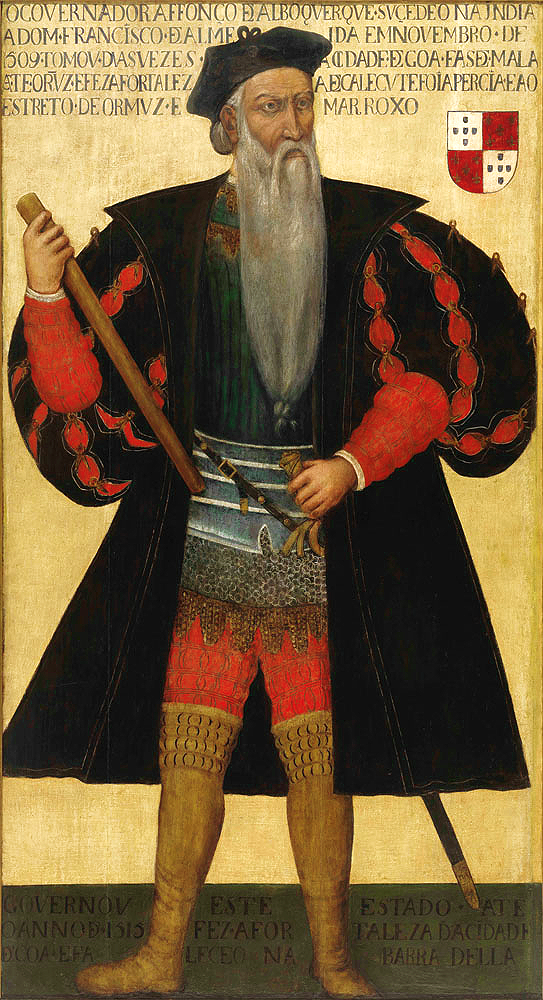
Afonso de Albuquerque, the Viceroy of Portuguese India who commissioned Rafael Perestrello's mission from Portuguese Malacca to the Ming dynasty of China.

Filippo Perestrello (also known as Filippone Pallastrelli), Rafael's great-grandfather and son of Gabriele Palastrelli and wife Madama Bertolina, was a nobleman from the Italian city of Piacenza who moved with his wife Catarina Sforza to Portugal in 1385, living in Porto and then in Lisbon to conduct trade. Filippo and Catarina had four children: Richarte (sometimes referred to as Rafael), Isabel (married to Aires Anes de Beja), Branca (who had natural issue by Dom Pedro de Noronha, 4th Archbishop of Lisbon from 1424 to 1452) and Bartolomeu (father-in-law to Christopher Columbus by his daughter Filipa). Richarte Perestrello (b. 1410) became a Prior in the very rich parish of Santa Marinha de Outeiro in Lisbon, yet fathered two children who he legitimized in 1423. Rafael was the son of Richarte's son João Lopes.

== Voyages to China ==
Rafael sailed in a ship from Portuguese Malacca to Guangzhou in southern China in 1516, sent by Afonso de Albuquerque, the Viceroy of Estado da India, in order to secure trading relations with the Chinese during the reign of the Ming dynasty ruler Zhengde (r. 1505–1521). Rafael traveled with a crew from a Malaysian junk, bringing back profitable trade items and glowing reports about China's commercial potential. In fact, his report on China was one of the main reasons why Fernão Pires de Andrade decided to carry out his mission in going to China instead of Bengal in 1517. Rafael was admitted into port by Chinese authorities in order to trade with the merchants there, but was not allowed to move further. In 1517, Rafael piloted yet another trade mission to Guangzhou.

Rafael Perestrello's mission was followed up in 1517 by the Portuguese apothecary Tomé Pires and pharmacist, merchant, and diplomat Fernão Pires de Andrade, in a diplomatic mission to Ming China commissioned by Manuel I of Portugal (1495–1521). Initial trade and diplomatic missions were temporarily ruined once wild rumors of Portuguese cannibalizing Chinese children was coupled with real events of Portuguese settlers breaking Chinese laws, pillaging Chinese villages, and taking off with female captives; the Chinese responded by burning and capturing Portuguese ships, detaining Portuguese prisoners, and executing some who were captured. The ex-sultan Mahmud Shah of Malacca had also sent diplomatic envoys to Ming dynasty China to seek aid in expelling the Portuguese from Malacca; although this was never carried out, the sultan's mission did succeed in convincing the Ming court in rejecting the Portuguese embassy of Andrade and Pires after the death of the Zhengde Emperor in 1521.

Despite these initial hostilities, a Portuguese settlement was eventually established at Macau and granted consent by the Chinese government in 1557, while annual Portuguese trade missions to Shangchuan Island took place since 1549. Leonel de Sousa, the second Governor of Macau, had smoothed out relations between the Chinese and Portuguese in the early 1550s, following a Portuguese effort to eliminate pirates along the coasts of China. The 1554 Luso-Chinese agreement finally legalized trade between the two realms.

== A captain in Sumatra ==
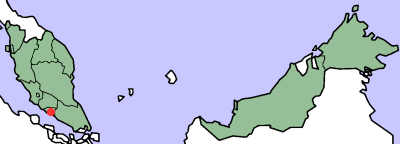
The red dot on the map signifies the central base of Portuguese Malacca.

Rafael served as a captain under Jorge de Albuquerque, the younger cousin of Afonso, when the former was governor of Malacca and battled against the Islamic Kingdom of Pacem in Sumatra in 1514 in order to install a ruler there that was friendly to Portuguese interests. While Rafael Perestrello's crew was aiding Jorge de Albuquerque's siege on a fort and large stockade defended by these Sumatran "Moors", a calafate of Rafael's troops named Marques was—according to the historian João de Barros—the first man to scale the heights of the stockade during the fight. The battle against the well-defended fort and ruler of Pacem (whom the Portuguese called Sultan "Geinal") was a success; Albuquerque saw to the installment of the next ruler and favorable trade demands of low prices for Southeast Asian pepper sold to the Portuguese. During Jorge de Albuquerque's second tour of duty, he defeated Mahmud Shah of Malacca at Bintan in 1524, forcing the latter to flee, this time to the Malay Peninsula.

== See also ==
- Europeans in Medieval China
- Age of Discovery
- Henry the Navigator
- History of the Ming dynasty
- History of Portugal (1415-1542)
