= Vasco Calvo =

Vasco Calvo is a character discovered by the narrator of Fernão Mendes Pinto's fantastical memoir Peregrinação ("Pilgrimage", written in the 1570s, published 1614). A former member of the ill-fated Portuguese embassy of 1517 to Beijing, capital of the Ming Empire, Calvo has since been living in internal exile in one of the capital's suburbs. The narrator meets him in 1544 while performing prison-labour on the nearby Great Wall.

Calvo has married a woman from a respectable local family; they have two sons and two daughters. The household features a chapel where the exotic Roman faith of the father is maintained and inculcated. The narrator is deeply moved by the chapel's beauty.

== Reality ==
China scholar Jonathan Spence says there is no evidence—nor much likelihood—of any mixed Sino-Euro family until much closer to the end of the 16th century.

== See also ==
- Fernão Pires de Andrade
- Rafael Perestrello
