= Cardinals created by Leo X =

Catholic appointments from 1513 to 1520

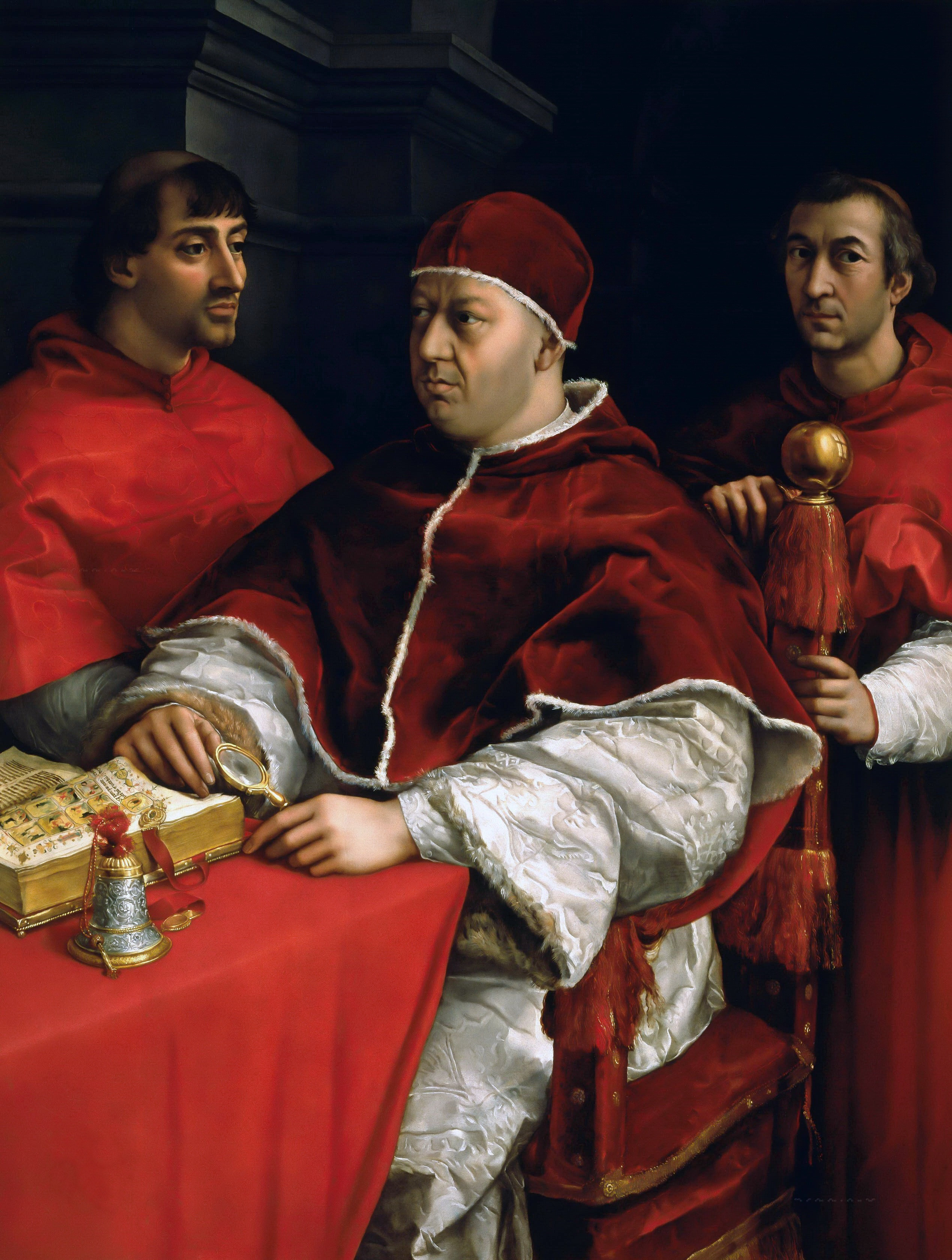
Pope Leo X (1475–1521) with Cardinals Giulio de' Medici (1478–1534) and Luigi de' Rossi (1474–1519)

Pope Leo X (r. 1513–1521) created 42 new cardinals in eight consistories.

== 23 September 1513 ==
All the new cardinals received their titles on 29 September 1513.

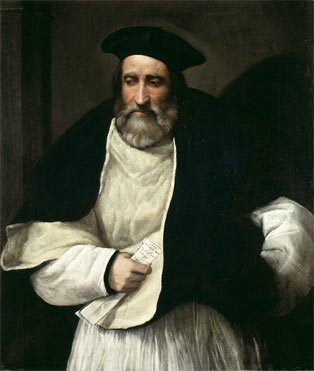
Lorenzo Pucci (1458–1531), made a cardinal on September 23, 1513

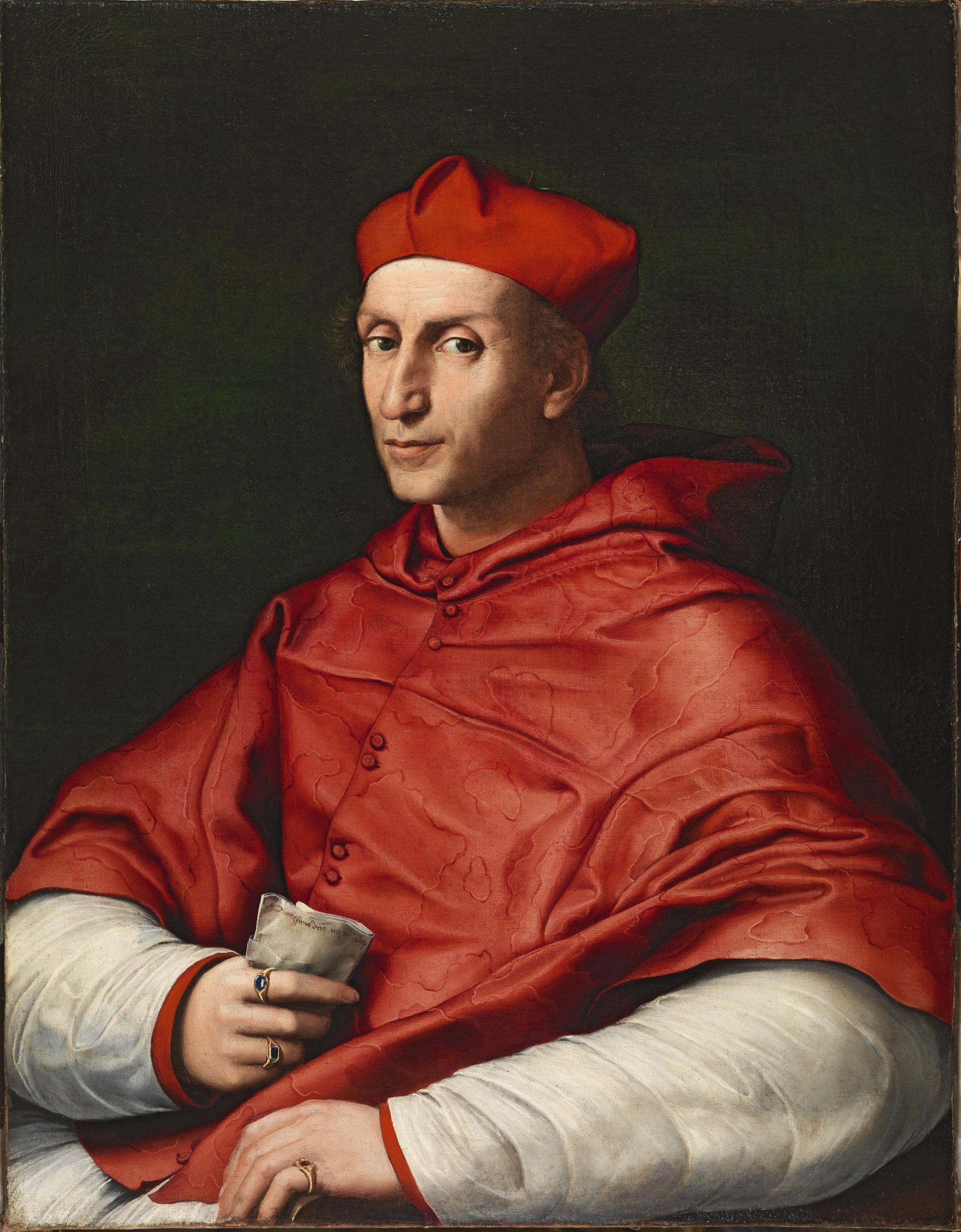
Bernardo Dovizi (1470–1520), made a cardinal on September 23, 1513

1. Lorenzo Pucci, bishop of Melfi – cardinal-priest of SS. IV Coronati, then cardinal-bishop of Albano (15 June 1524), cardinal-bishop of Palestrina (24 July 1524), † 16 September 1531
2. Giulio de’ Medici, cousin of the Pope, archbishop of Florence – cardinal-deacon of S. Maria in Domnica, then cardinal-priest of S. Clemente (2 June 1517), cardinal-priest of S. Lorenzo in Damaso (6 July 1517), became Pope Clement VII on 19 November 1523, † 25 September 1534
3. Bernardo Dovizi – cardinal-deacon of S. Maria in Portico, † 1 November 1520
4. Innocenzo Cybo, nephew of the Pope – cardinal-deacon of SS. Cosma e Damiano, then cardinal-deacon of S. Maria in Domica (26 June 1517), cardinal-deacon of S. Maria in Via Lata (28 February 1550), † 1 April 1550

== 10 September 1515 ==
1. Thomas Wolsey, archbishop of York – cardinal-priest of S. Cecilia, † 29 November 1530

== 14 December 1515 ==
1. Adrian Gouffier de Boissy, bishop of Coutances – cardinal-priest of SS. Marcellino e Pietro, then cardinal-priest of S. Balbina (1518?), † 9 November 1520

== 1 April 1517 ==
All the new cardinals received their titles on 25 May 1517

1. Antoine Bohier Du Prat, O.S.B., archbishop of Bourges – cardinal-priest of S. Anastasia, † 27 November 1519
2. Guillaume de Croÿ, bishop of Cambrai – cardinal-deacon of S. Maria in Aquiro, † 6 January 1521

== 1 July 1517 ==
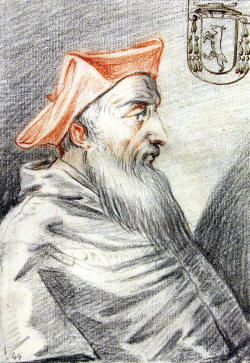
Giovanni Domenico de Cupis (1493–1553), made a cardinal on July 1, 1517

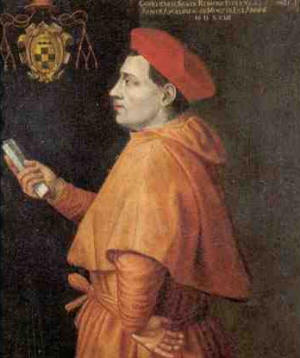
Giovanni Battista Pallavicino (1480–1524), made a cardinal on July 1, 1517

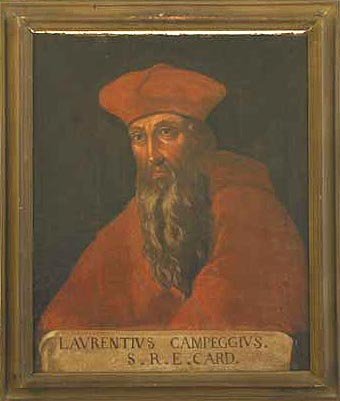
Lorenzo Campeggio (1474–1539), made a cardinal on July 1, 1517

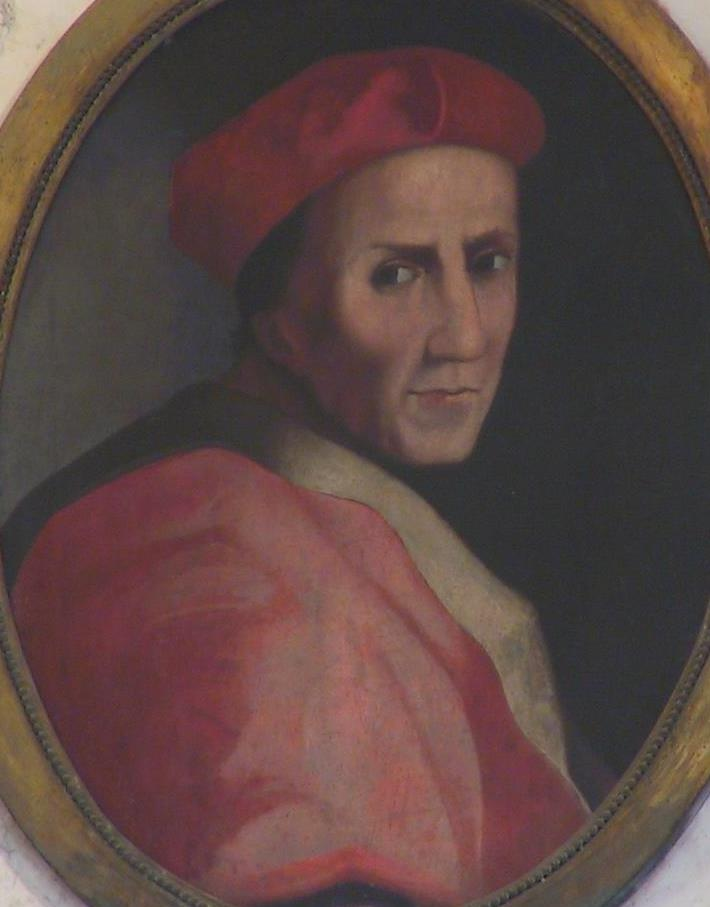
Silvio Passerini (1469–1529), made a cardinal on July 1, 1517

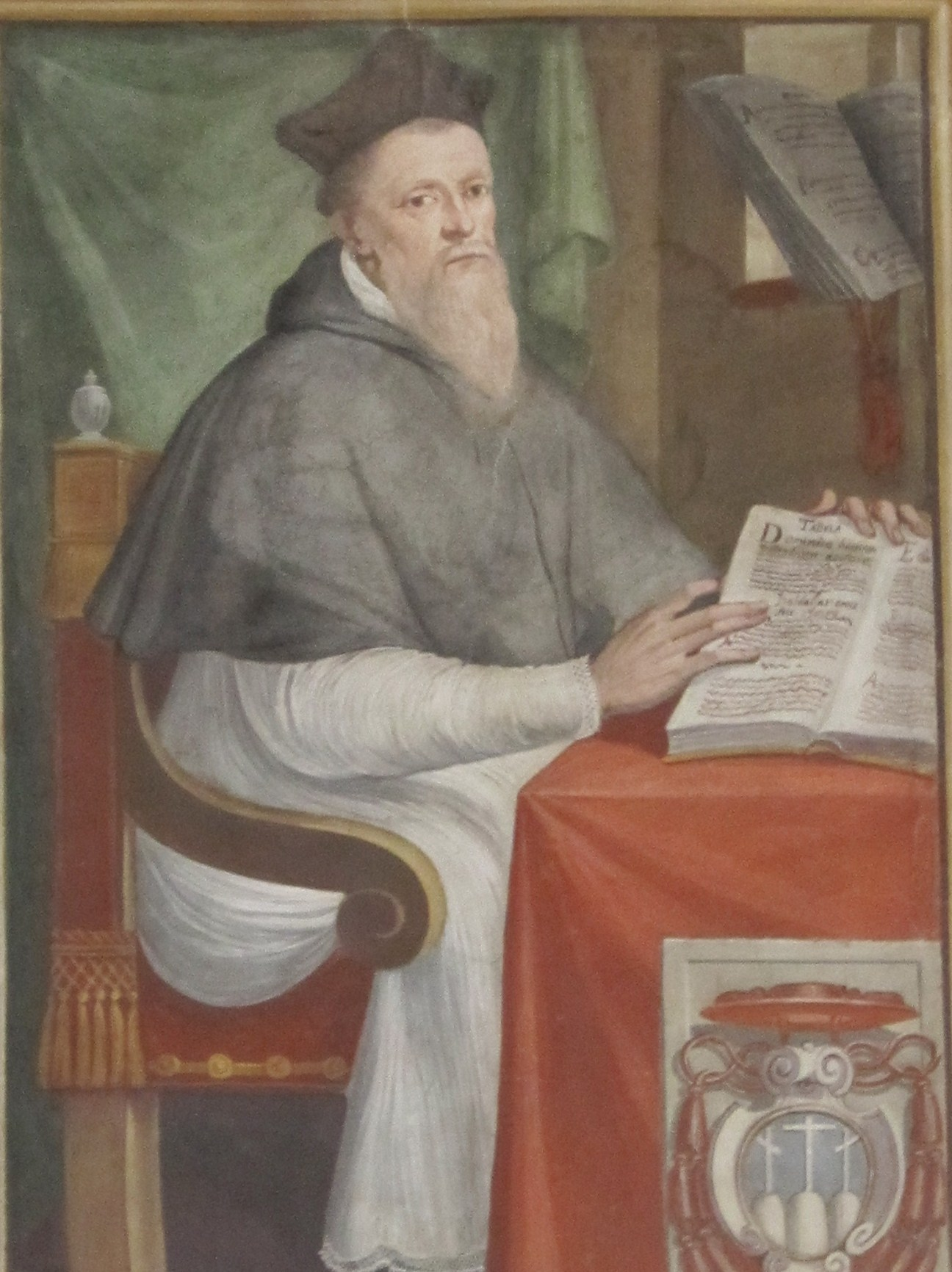
Giles of Viterbo (1469–1532), made a cardinal on July 1, 1517

Niccolò Ridolfi (1501-50), made a cardinal on July 1, 1517

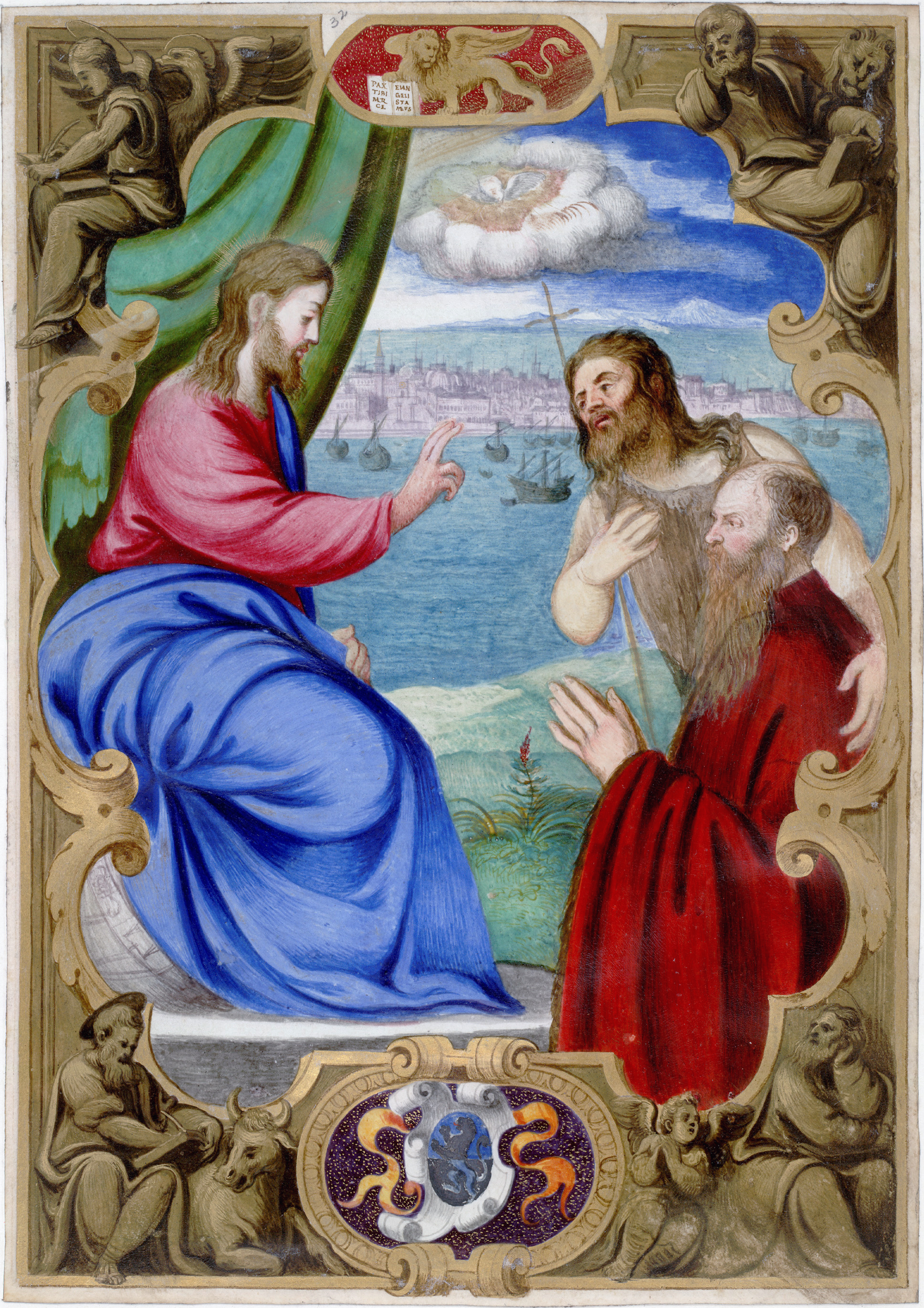
Francesco Pisani (1494–1570), made a cardinal on July 1, 1517

1. Francesco Conti, bishop-elect of Conza – cardinal-priest of S. Vitale (received the title on 6 July 1517), † 29 June 1521
2. Giovanni Piccolomini, archbishop of Siena – cardinal-priest of S. Sabina (received the title on 6 July 1517), then cardinal-priest of S. Balbina (11 June 1521), cardinal-bishop of Albano (24 July 1524), cardinal-bishop of Palestrina (22 September 1531), cardinal-bishop of Porto e S. Rufina (26 September 1533), cardinal-bishop of Ostia e Velletri (26 February 1535), † 21 November 1537
3. Giovanni Domenico de Cupis, bishop-elect of Trani – cardinal-priest of S. Giovanni a Porta Latina (received the title on 6 July 1517), then cardinal-priest of S. Apollinare (17 August 1524), cardinal-priest of S. Lorenzo in Lucina (24 May 1529), cardinal-bishop of Albano (22 September 1531), cardinal-bishop of Sabina (16 December 1532), cardinal-bishop of Porto e S. Rufina (26 February 1535), cardinal-bishop of Ostia e Velletri (28 November 1537), † 10 December 1553
4. Niccolò Pandolfini, bishop of Pistoia – cardinal-priest of S. Cesareo (received the title on 6 July 1517), † 17 September 1518
5. Raffaello Petrucci, bishop of Grosseto – cardinal-priest of S. Susanna (received the title on 26 December 1517), † 11 December 1522
6. Andrea della Valle, bishop of Mileto – cardinal-priest of S. Agnese in Agone (received the title on 6 July 1517), then cardinal-priest of S. Prisca (27 March 1525), cardinal-bishop of Albano (21 April 1533), cardinal-bishop of Palestrina (12 December 1533), † 4 August 1534
7. Bonifacio Ferrero, bishop of Ivrei – cardinal-priest of SS. Nereo ed Achilleo (received the title on 6 July 1517), then cardinal-bishop of Albano (12 December 1533), cardinal-bishop of Palestrina (5 September 1534), cardinal-bishop of Sabina (26 February 1535), cardinal-bishop of Porto e S. Rufina 28 November 1537), † 2 January 1543
8. Giovanni Battista Pallavicino, bishop of Cavaillon – cardinal-priest of S. Apollinare (received the title on 6 July 1517), † 13 August 1524
9. Scaramuccia Trivulzio, bishop of Como – cardinal-priest of S. Ciriaco (received the title on 6 July 1517), † 3 August 1527
10. Pompeo Colonna, bishop of Rieti – cardinal-priest of SS. XII Apostoli (received the title on 13 November 1517), then cardinal-priest of S. Lorenzo in Damaso (11 January 1524), † 28 June 1532
11. Domenico Giacobazzi, bishop of Nocera – cardinal-priest of S. Lorenzo in Panisperna (received the title on 6 July 1517), then cardinal-priest of S. Bartolomeo all'Isola (10 July 1517), cardinal-priest of S. Clemente (20 August 1519), † 1528
12. Louis de Bourbon de Vendôme, bishop of Laon – cardinal-priest of S. Silvestro in Capite (received the title in 1517), then cardinal-priest of SS. Silvestro e Martino (1521), cardinal-priest of S. Sabina (3 March 1533), cardinal-bishop of Palestrina (24 February 1550), † 13 March 1557
13. Lorenzo Campeggio, bishop-elect of Feltre – cardinal-priest of S. Tommaso in Parione (received the title on 24 January 1518), then cardinal-priest of S. Anastasia (1520?), cardinal-priest of S. Maria in Trastevere (27 April 1528), cardinal-bishop of Albano (5 September 1534), cardinal-bishop of Palestrina (26 February 1535), cardinal-bishop of Sabina (28 November 1537), † 19 July 1539
14. Ferdinando Ponzetti. bishop of Molfetty – cardinal-priest of S. Pancrazio (received the title on 6 July 1517), † 9 September 1527
15. Luigi de' Rossi, cousin of the Pope – cardinal-priest of S. Clemente (received the title on 6 July 1517), † 20 August 1520
16. Silvio Passerini, datary of His Holiness, administrator of Cortona – cardinal-priest of S. Lorenzo in Lucina (received the title on 6 July 1517), then cardinal-priest of S. Pietro in Vincoli (17 September 1520) i ponownie cardinal-priest of S. Lorenzo in Lucina (5 January 1521), † 20 April 1529
17. Francesco Armellini Pantalassi de' Medici, adopted relative of the Pope – cardinal-priest of S. Callisto (received the title on 6 July 1517), then cardinal-priest of S. Maria in Trastevere (22 November 1523), † 8 January 1528
18. Adriaan van Utrecht, bishop of Tortosa – cardinal-priest of SS. Giovanni e Paolo (received the title in July 1517), became Pope Hadrian VI on 9 January 1522, † 14 September 1523
19. Tommaso Vio, O.P., Master General of the Order of Preachers – cardinal-priest of S. Sisto (received the title on 6 July 1517), then cardinal-priest of S. Prassede (14 March 1534), † 10 August 1534
20. Egidio di Viterbo, O.S.A., Master General of the Order of Saint Augustine– cardinal-priest of S. Bartolomeo all'Isola (received the title on 6 July 1517), then cardinal-priest of S. Matteo in Merulana (10 July 1517), cardinal-priest of S. Marcello (9 May 1530), † 12 November 1532
21. Cristoforo Numai, O.F.M.Obs., Master General of the Order of Friars Minor Observants– cardinal-priest of S. Matteo in Merulana (received the title on 6 July 1517), then cardinal-priest of S. Maria in Aracoeli (10 July 1517), zm 23 March 1528
22. Guillén-Ramón de Vich y de Vallterra – cardinal-priest of S. Marcello (received the title on 13 November 1517), † 27 July 1525
23. Franciotto Orsini – cardinal-deacon of S. Giorgio in Velabro (received the title on 6 July 1517), then cardinal-deacon of S. Maria in Cosmedin (1519), † 10 January 1534
24. Paolo Emilio Cesi – cardinal-deacon of S. Nicola inter Imagines (received the title on 6 July 1517), then cardinal-deacon of S. Eustachio (5 September 1534), † 5 August 1537
25. Alessandro Cesarini – cardinal-deacon of SS. Sergio e Bacco (received the title on 6 July 1517), then cardinal-deacon of S Maria in Via Lata (14 December 1523), cardinal-bishop of Albano (31 May 1540), cardinal-bishop of Palestrina (14 November 1541), † 13 February 1542
26. Giovanni Salviati – cardinal-deacon of SS. Cosma e Damiano (received the title on 13 November 1517), then cardinal-bishop of Albano (8 January 1543), cardinal-bishop of Sabina (17 October 1544), cardinal-bishop of Porto e S. Rufina (8 October 1546), † 28 October 1553
27. Niccolò Ridolfi – cardinal-deacon of SS. Vito e Modesto (received the title on 6 July 1517), then cardinal-deacon of S. Maria in Cosmedin (19 January 1534), cardinal-deacon of S. Maria in Via Lata (31 May 1540), † 31 January 1550
28. Ercole Rangoni – cardinal-deacon of S. Agata (received the title on 6 July 1517), † w sierpniu 1527
29. Agostino Trivulzio – cardinal-deacon of S. Adriano (received the title on 6 July 1517), then cardinal-deacon of S. Eustachio (17 August 1537) and again cardinal-deacon of S. Adriano (6 September 1537), † 30 March 1548
30. Francesco Pisani – cardinal-deacon of S. Teodoro (received the title on 6 July 1517), then cardinal-deacon of S. Marco (3 May 1527), cardinal-bishop of Albano (29 May 1555), cardinal-bishop of Frascati (20 September 1557), cardinal-bishop of Porto e S. Rufina (18 May 1562), cardinal-bishop of Ostia e Velletri (12 May 1564), † 28 June 1570
31. Afonso de Portugal, son of the king of Portugal Manuel, bishop-elect of Idana – cardinal-deacon of S. Lucia in Septisolio (received the title in 1525), then cardinal-priest of SS. Giovanni e Paolo (13 August 1535), † 21 April 1540

== 24 March 1518 ==
1. Albrecht von Brandenburg, archbishop of Magdeburg and of Mainz – cardinal-priest of S. Crisogono (received the title on 5 July 1518), then cardinal-priest of S. Pietro in Vincoli (5 January 1521), † 24 September 1545

== 28 May 1518 ==
1. Jean de Lorraine-Guise, bishop of Metz – cardinal-deacon of S. Onofrio (received the title on 7 January 1519), † 10 May 1550

== 9 August 1520 ==
1. Eberhard von der Mark, bishop of Chartres – cardinal-priest of S. Crisogono (received the title on 5 January 1521), † 27 February 1538

== Sources ==
- Miranda, Salvador. "Consistories for the creation of Cardinals, 16th Century (1503-1605): Leo X (1513-1521)". The Cardinals of the Holy Roman Church. Florida International University. OCLC 53276621.
- Konrad Eubel, Hierarchia Catholica, Vol. III, Münster 1923
