= Leonel de Sousa =

Captain-major of Macau

Leonel de Sousa was the second captain-major of Portuguese Macau in 1558 (the equivalent of the later governor of Macau). In 1554 he had negotiated an agreement with the local authorities of Guangzhou known as the first Luso-Chinese agreement, which allowed the legalization of Portuguese commercial activities in China through the payment of taxes. This agreement opened the way for the establishment of Macau as a Portuguese warehouse three years later. This agreement, which was negotiated by Leonel de Sousa, captain-chief of Japan's voyage, opened a new era in Sino-Portuguese relations, because since 1522 the Portuguese were officially prevented from trading: several embassies had failed and trade was carried out as contraband and fought by the authorities, who considered them 'folanji' fighting them as pirates.

== Agreement negotiation ==
Since the arrival in Japan in 1543, the Portuguese had begun an intense commerce between Goa and Malacca with Japan. Leonel de Sousa, the chief captain of Japan's voyage, arrived at the coast of Guangdong in 1552, where he learned that all foreigners were permitted to trade there for the fee payment, except the 'Folanji' (the pejorative name for the Europeans and for the Portuguese in particular, who were considered pirates). He promised that the peace conditions and the taxes payment to be fulfilled providing the authorities to change this 'name'. In 1554 Leonel de Sousa, together with the chief captain of Chaul, made an agreement with officials of Canton to legalize the Portuguese commerce, on conditions that they would pay the stipulated customs duties.

The only written testimony of this agreement is a letter from Leonel de Sousa of 1556 to the Infant D. Luís, where he affirmed that the Portuguese were to pay the fees and not to erect fortifications. The letter is one of the most important documents in the history of Sino-Portuguese relations, describes the prolonged negotiations with the superintendent of the navy of Canton, the Haitao Wang Po, identified in the Chinese sources as that who had accepted a bribe of the Portuguese by letting them pay taxes in Canton. As the port of Guangzhou also faced impoverishment since it was closed to foreign trade the agreement was profitable for both sides. Leonel de Sousa tried to negotiate the payment of only 10% of the fees, to which Wan Po counterposed the obligatory 20% but focusing only on half the load, which Leonel de Sousa took with the help of the wealthy merchant Simão d'Almeida, and outside the Beijing government. This treaty would be followed by the recognition of Macau as a Portuguese official warehouse in 1557.
