= Jorge Álvares =

Portuguese explorer (died 1521)

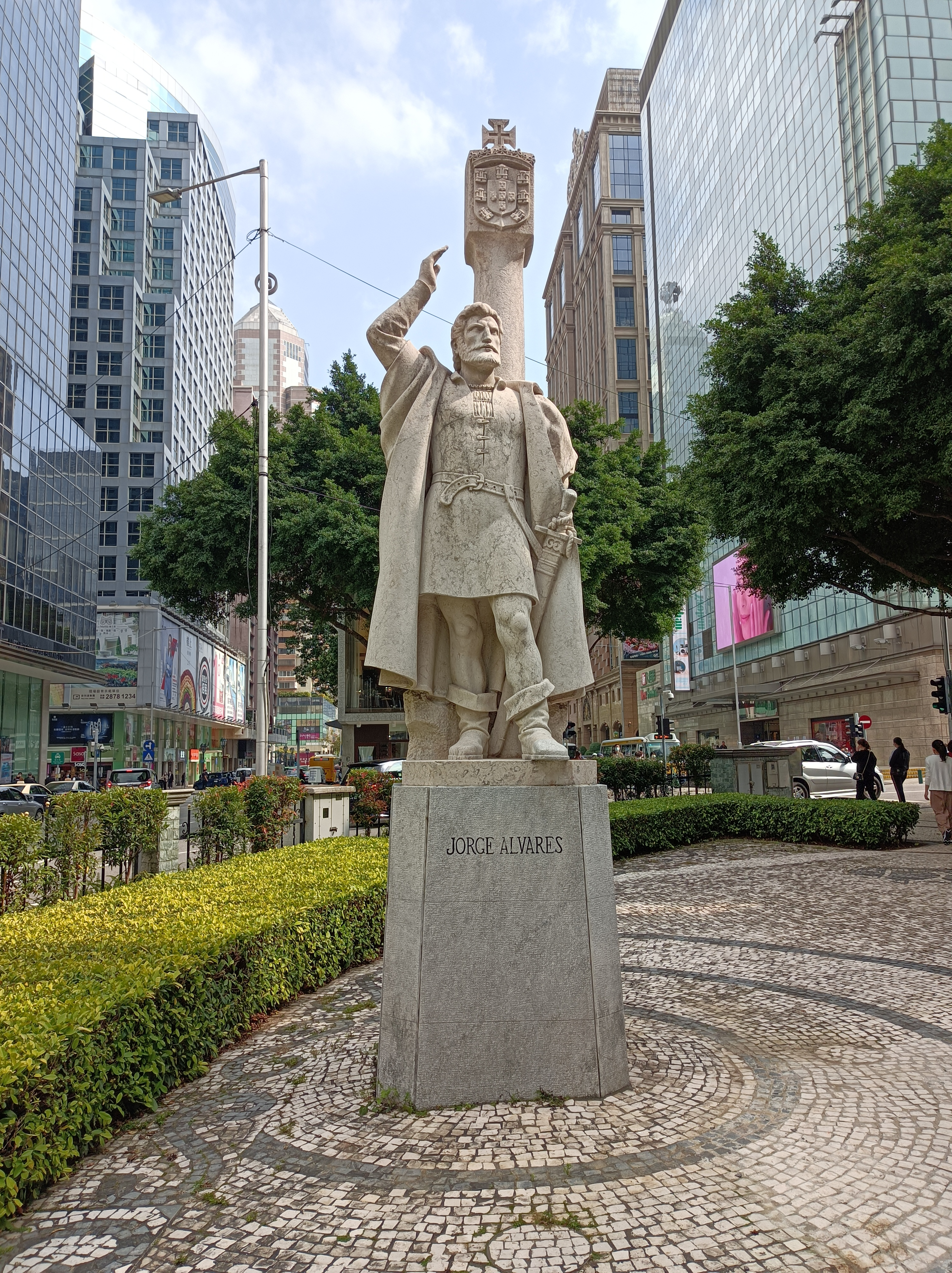
- Jorge Álvares statue in Macau
- Born: Late 15th century Freixo de Espada à Cinta, Portugal
- Died: 8 July 1521; Tamão (present-day Hong Kong)
- Occupation: Explorer
- Known for: First European explorer to reach China by sea during the Age of Discovery

Jorge Álvares (died 8 July 1521) was a Portuguese explorer. He is credited as the first European to have reached China by sea during the Age of Discovery. His starting of settlements on an island in what is now Hong Kong is still considered a significant achievement, "for establishing commercial agreements with the Chinese [and for] maintaining the peace".

== Exploration ==
In May 1513, Álvares sailed under the Portuguese Malacca captain Rui de Brito Patalim in a junk from Pegu. The expedition was accompanied by five other junks. Álvares himself was accompanied by two other Portuguese mariners.

Álvares made first contact on Chinese soil on an island near the historic city of Guangzhou in southern China in May 1513. The location of the island, which the Portuguese called Tamão, is not exactly known except that it is in the Pearl River Delta, and scholarship has suggested islands such as Lantau Island and Lintin Island as potential candidates. Upon landing on Tamão, Álvares raised a padrão from the king of Portugal. Based on information from their captain, they hoped to find a trade. Soon after this, Afonso de Albuquerque, the Viceroy of the Estado da Índia dispatched Rafael Perestrello—a cousin of Christopher Columbus—to seek trade relations with the Chinese. In a ship from Malacca, Rafael Perestrello landed on the southern shores of Guangdong later that year in 1513.

According to a 1955 book by J. M. Braga, Álvares "learned about China's culture, religion, finances, and military, valuable information for King Manuel I".

== Death and legacy ==
Álvares died on 8 July 1521 in Tamão in the arms of his friend Duarte Coelho. Aside from questions as to the location of the place, historians also have no evidence as to the cause of death.

Although the manner of his death was not recorded, Tamão was attacked in 1521 by the Chinese navy; it was abandoned and the Portuguese fled to Malacca, in Malaysia. Over the subsequent years, the memories of the significance of his explorations and settlement faded. "Álvares’ role was reduced to a footnote."

According to National Geographic, "Macau may never have existed if not for Tamão" where the Portuguese learned "how China, the Pearl River Delta, and the South China Sea worked". The settlement and Jorge Álvares "kickstarted a chain of events that ultimately spawned Macau".

== See also ==
- Chronology of European exploration of Asia
- Europeans in Medieval China
- Fernão Pires de Andrade
- Rafael Perestrello
- Luso-Chinese agreement (1554)
