= Tomé Pires =

Portuguese apothecary and diplomat

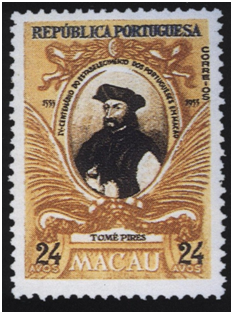
- Born: c. 1468; Lisbon, Portugal
- Died: 1524 or 1540; China
- Occupations: Apothecary, diplomat

Tomé Pires (c. 1468 — c. 1524/1540) (Note: Date of death is disputed. Cortesão says he died of natural causes in 1540. Other historians say he was likely executed by the Chinese in 1524.) was a Portuguese apothecary, colonial administrator, and diplomat. Tomé Pires served as apothecary to Prince Alfonso until the prince's death in 1491. In 1510 he was commissioned by the Portuguese court to serve as a "factor of drugs" in India, arriving at Cannanore in 1511. In 1512 he was sent to the port city of Malacca, recently captured by the Portuguese. There he served as the chief accountant for the royal factory. Upon his return to India in 1515, Pires was sent to China as ambassador from the King of Portugal to the Ming Court. His mission failed when the Chinese court refused to recognize him because of the increasingly hostile activities of Portuguese traders in the region. Pires never left China; he was either executed by the Chinese in 1524 or possibly banished for life to a remote Chinese province.

During his stay in Malacca, Pires wrote the Suma Oriental, a landmark description of the geography, ethnography and commerce of the Asian coastline stretching from the Red Sea to Japan. The manuscript is an important record of the region at the start of European colonization in the early sixteenth century.

== Biography ==
Very little is known about the life and family of Pires prior to his arrival in India. He was born around 1468, possibly in the Portuguese town of Leiria but evidence of his birthplace is tenuous. He had at least one brother, João Fernandes, and a sister, Isabel Fernandes. His father was apothecary to King João II of Portugal and Pires himself was apothecary to Prince Afonso, the heir apparent until his untimely death in 1491.

He went to India in 1511, invested as "factor of drugs", the Eastern commodities that were an important element of what is generally called "the spice trade". In Malacca and Cochin he avidly collected and documented information on the Malay-Indonesian area, and personally visited Java, Sumatra and Maluku.

== Suma Oriental ==
From his Malay-Indonesia travels, he wrote a book on Asian trade, the Suma Oriental que trata do Mar Roxo até aos Chins (An Account of the East, from the Red Sea to China). He wrote the book in Malacca and India between 1512 and 1515, completing it before the death of Afonso de Albuquerque in December 1515.

It was the first comprehensive and reliable account of Asia to the east of India, a region that was almost unknown to Europe at the time. Among its many accomplishments, it contained the first European descriptions of the Malay Archipelago and the Spice Islands. The historical account of Malacca is the earliest known and contains much information not found anywhere else. Pires was also the first to use the name Japan, spelling it as Jampon. The details and accuracy of his descriptions of Sumatra and Java are "remarkable" and were not surpassed for a "couple centuries". It remains one of the most important resources for the study of Islam in Indonesia.

The Suma Oriental is a compilation of a wide variety of information: historical, geographical, ethnographic, botanical, economic, commercial, etc., including coins, weights and measures. Pires was careful to investigate the accuracy of the information collected from merchants, sailors and others with whom he had contact. It shows him to be a discriminating observer, in spite of his tangled prose. "His style is far from clear," his modern editor has noted, "and no doubt it often becomes more confused, owing to the transcriber's mistakes." The book, couched as a report to Manuel of Portugal, and perhaps fulfilling a commission undertaken before he left Lisbon, is regarded as one of the most conscientious first-hand resources for the study of the geography and trade of the Indies at that time. Although it cannot be regarded as completely free of inaccuracies in its detail, it is remarkably consistent with evidence of the time and makes no fundamentally erroneous statements about the area. Its contemporary rival as a source was only the better-known book by Duarte Barbosa.

The Suma Oriental was unpublished and presumed lost until 1944 when a manuscript copy was discovered in a Paris archive. Four letters written by Pires survive, and there are a scattering of references to him by contemporaries, including a letter from Albuquerque to the King, 30 November 1513.

== 1516 embassy to China ==
In 1516, Tomé Pires went to Canton (Guangzhou) in the fleet of Fernão Pires de Andrade leading an embassy sent by king Manuel I to Zhengde Emperor of China. However, he was never received by the emperor, due to several setbacks, including the suspicion of the Chinese, and the plot moved by deposed sultan Mahmud Shah after the Portuguese conquest of Malacca in 1511. The embassy fell in disgrace, with some of its members killed, starting a period of three decades of Portuguese persecution in China. Tomé Pires is said to have died of disease in 1524 in China, although some state he lived up to 1540 in Jiangsu, but without permission to leave China.

This was the first official embassy from a European nation to China after Giovanni de' Marignolli was sent as legate by the Papacy (in Beijing from 1342 to 1345).

== See also ==
- Fernão Pires de Andrade
- Jorge Álvares
- History of Indonesia

== Bibliography ==
- Albuquerque, L. “Tomé Pires”, in Dictionary of Scientific Biography. 1974. Vol. 10, p. 616.
- Cortesão, Armando, ed. (1944). The Suma Oriental of Tome Pires 1512-1515. London: Hakluyt Society.
- Diffie, Bailey W. (1977). Foundations of the Portuguese empire, 1415-1580. George D. Winius. Minneapolis: University of Minnesota Press. pp. 383–386. ISBN 978-0-8166-8156-3. OCLC 227038282.
- Fujitani, James (2016). "The Ming Rejection of the Portuguese Embassy of 1517: A Reassessment". Journal of World History. 27 (1): 87–102. ISSN 1045-6007. JSTOR 43901825.
- Howgego, Raymond John, ed. (2003). "Pires, Tomé". Encyclopedia of Exploration to 1800. Hordern House. pp. 831–832. ISBN 1875567364.
- Madureira, Luis. "Tropical Sex Fantasies and the Ambassador's Other Death: The Difference in Portuguese Colonialism," Cultural Critique (Number 28; Fall of 1994): 149–173.
- Muller, Karl, and David Pickell (eds) (1997). Maluku: Indonesian Spice Islands. (Singapore: Periplus Editions), p. 86.
- Ricklefs, M.C. (1991). A History of Modern Indonesia since c. 1300 (2nd ed.). London: MacMillan. ISBN 0-333-57689-6.
- Wills, John E., Jr. (1998). "Relations with Maritime Europe, 1514–1662" in The Cambridge History of China: Volume 8, The Ming Dynasty, 1368–1644, Part 2, 333–375. Edited by Denis Twitchett and Frederick W. Mote. New York: Cambridge University Press. ISBN 0-521-24333-5.
