= Battle of Xicaowan =

Naval battle in Asia in 1522

Date	August 7–20, 1522
Location	"Xicaowan" in the Pearl River estuary
Result	Ming victory

Belligerents
Ming dynasty	Kingdom of Portugal

Commanders and leaders
Ke Rong (柯榮); Wang Ying'en (王應恩) †	Martim Afonso de Mello Coutinho; Pedro Homem †

Strength
30 ships: 8 large junks	6 ships: 2 heavy carracks; 2 small carracks; 2 junks; 300 men

Casualties and losses
Unknown	1 ship destroyed 1 ship captured 42 men captured

The Battle of Xicaowan (traditional Chinese: 西草灣之戰; simplified Chinese: 西草湾之战; pinyin: Xīcǎowān zhī Zhàn) was a naval battle between the Ming dynasty coast guard and a Portuguese fleet led by Martim Afonso de Mello that occurred in 1522.

The Ming court threatened to expel Portuguese traders from China after receiving news that the Malacca Sultanate, a Ming tributary, had been invaded by the Portuguese. In addition, the Portuguese had been conducting piracy, acquiring slaves on the Chinese coast to sell in Portuguese Malacca, and preventing other foreigners from trading in China. Portuguese traders were executed in China and a Portuguese embassy was arrested, with their freedom promised on the condition that the Portuguese returned Malacca to its sultan.

Martim Afonso de Mello arrived at the Pearl River but was blockaded by a Ming fleet despite his offers of amends. After two weeks without being able to gain a foothold in China they decided to run the blockade and managed to escape with the loss of two ships and several dozen men.

== Background ==
Because King Manuel I of Portugal wished to establish diplomatic and commercial relations with China, in April 1521, the new governor of Portuguese India Dom Duarte de Menezes was dispatched together with captain-major Martim Afonso de Mello, tasked with constructing a feitoria (trade post) close to Guangzhou. Since Mello's mission was primarily commercial and diplomatic, his vessels carried mainly small caliber cannon, and barely any heavy guns; furthermore, two-thirds of his crew had perished during the long voyage to Malacca. He arrived there in July 1522 where he came across skepticism towards his mission from the local Portuguese, who had been trading in China for several years, and informed him of the tensions in China.

Portuguese such as Simão de Andrade had been conducting piracy and purchasing slaves along the Chinese coast to sell in Portuguese Malacca, and blatantly ignored the Ming emperor's authority by building a fort at Tunmen, after his request for Tunmen was denied. Although buying and selling children was common practice in the region, the Portuguese chronicler João de Barros concluded that they had been seized without knowledge from their parents and even came from noble families. Even children from well off families were sold and found years later at Diu in western India. Rumors that Simao and other Portuguese were cannibalizing children for food spread across China. Besides aggressive trading through force of arms and abducting and selling Chinese men, women, and children into slavery, Simao also encouraged "robbers, kidnappers, and all sorts of wickedness." Other foreigners such as Malays and Siamese were prevented from conducting trade until the Portuguese had finished their own business. They refused to pay customs duties and abused an official who had complained about their behavior. The Portuguese were also accused of robbing foreign ships. Simao's pirating activities greatly angered both the Chinese people and the court, which led Ming officials to order the eviction of the Tunmen Portuguese.

The Portuguese had also conquered the Malacca Sultanate in 1511. Ming officials were notified of the Portuguese conquest of Malacca by the Sultan, who called the Portuguese "sea robbers," and were displeased. As the sultanate was a tributary of the Ming dynasty, the emperor demanded that the Portuguese withdraw from Malacca and restore the Malay sultan to the throne. Chinese authorities were suspicious of the Portuguese explanation that they conquered Malacca due to "the local ruler's tyrannies against the Chinese," even though the Chinese residents of Malacca had fully supported the Portuguese takeover. The problem was further compounded by the illegality of overseas Chinese trade under Ming law, making them even more suspicious. The Chinese responded by blockading the Portuguese fort at Tunmen.

In 1520, Fernão Pires de Andrade arrived in Beijing awaiting an audience with the emperor. However, when reports of Portuguese piracy and the seizure of Malacca reached Beijing, the embassy was sent back to Guangzhou. They were detained there and offered their freedom on the condition that the Portuguese returned Malacca, which had been a Ming tributary, to the Sultan. When Pires arrived he was put in chains and kept in prison. He was never released. Prior to Pires' arrival other Portuguese had been executed by beating, strangling, and other forms of torture. Ming officials confiscated from the Portuguese embassy "twenty quintals of rhubarb, one thousand five hundred or six hundred rich pieces of silk."

Some of the Portuguese were able to break the blockade in 1521, escaping the Battle of Tunmen with the help of a favourable wind. On 10 July 1522, Martim Afonso de Mello set sail for China from Malacca. With him were Duarte Coelho and Ambrósio do Rego, two captains who participated in the Tunmen sea battle of the previous year.

== Battle ==
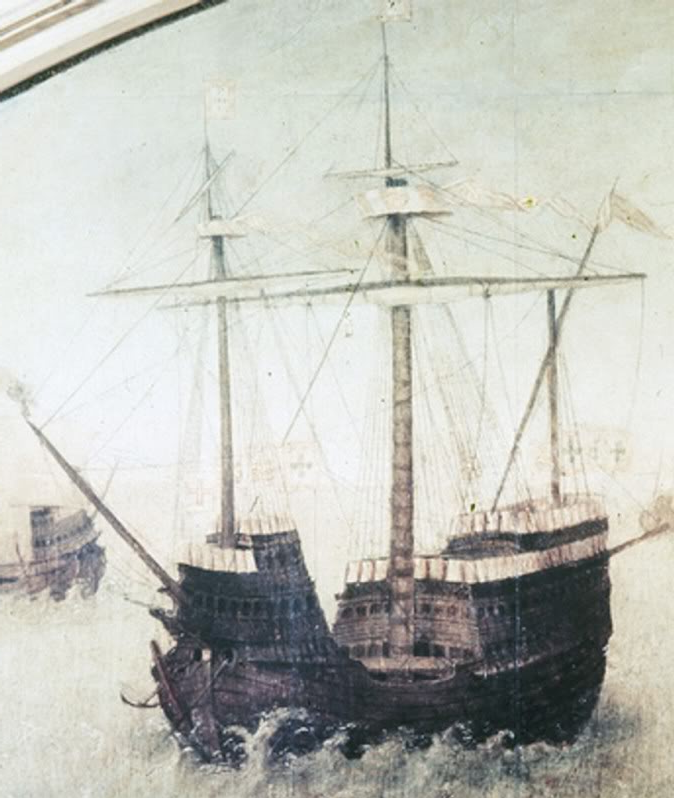
A heavy 16th century Portuguese carrack

Initially Mello's expedition experienced a storm but survived and successfully sailed up the Pearl River delta towards Guangzhou before the end of July. They were promptly confronted by a Ming fleet led by Ke Rong and Wang Ying'en, which proceeded to fire warning shots at the Portuguese. According to Mello, "They just wanted to demonstrate their power ... doing nothing more than going in front of me and shooting a few shots, [making noise] with their drums and gongs, placing themselves in front of the port that I intended to reach." Mello gave orders not to return fire as his goal was peace, but he wrote that "it pained me that I could not shoot them." As the Ming fleet closed in on the junk ship of António do Rego however, he opened fire, making the Chinese fall back with Rego abandoning formation to give chase. Immediately he was signaled from the flagship to return to formation and was later reprehended by Martim Afonso.

The Chinese could not prevent the Portuguese from dropping anchor by an island the Portuguese dubbed Veniaga ("trade"), and remained outside their effective range, occasionally firing their bombards on the Portuguese ships to no effect. That night, the Portuguese captured 5 fishermen, who were given a reward and told by de Mello to deliver a message to the captain of the Ming fleet the following morning, stating that he intended to trade and offer compensation for any past misdoings of his countrymen. Mello received no reply. The following night, the Portuguese again sent two envoys to the Chinese fleet, but were met with a brief bombardment.

On the third night, a craft from Duarte Coelho's junk ship managed to run the blockade under cover of darkness and reach the fleet, and stated that Duarte Coelho had his ship sheltered behind an island close by, but would not join the fleet because of the Chinese, unless they came to his aid. De Mello detached two armed craft to return to Duarte Coelho and escort him, but could not breach the Chinese blockade. Irritated, Mello finally decided to confront the Chinese, but was rebuffed by his captains who thought that they should remain passive instead. Several days passed by until Duarte Coelho eventually decided to depart for Malacca.

For the remaining Portuguese, their greatest concern became their dwindling water reserves. Mello armed four boats with cannons and personally led them ashore to fill the barrels with water. Such a move did not go unnoticed by the Ming fleet, which detached several oar ships to give chase to the Portuguese water expedition, and pinned them down with artillery fire for an hour before Mello ordered his men to abandon the water barrels and immediately re-embark. The Ming fleet gave chase as the Portuguese made their way back to their ships, forcing them to detach extra weight and abandon their anchors to make a break for deep water, all the while firing volleys of shrapnel and matchlock fire to keep the Chinese boarding parties at bay. When they reached their ships, the Ming fleet gave up chase as the carracks out ranged them and proceeded to bombard their fleet. According to Mello, they came back with "blood instead of water."

Back on board but lacking enough water, de Mello decided to retreat and return to Malacca. Fourteen days after arriving on the Pearl River delta, the Portuguese weighed anchor and prepared to run the Chinese blockade. The two heavy carracks in the front cleared a path through the Ming fleet amidst heavy arrow and gun fire while replying with powerful cannon salvos, matchlock fire, and hurling gunpowder bombs. In the rear, two smaller carracks got separated, and on Diogo de Mello's carrack a gunpowder barrel keg was lit by a cannon shot and exploded. Another account says it was an accident. The ship sank. Portuguese chronicler João de Barros writes, "The first sign that victory would be given to the enemy came in the form of a spark getting into the powder carried by Diogo de Mello, which blew the decks of his vessel into the air. He and the hull went to the bottom together." Diogo's brother was devastated, writing, "I saw one of the vessels burst into flames and go down to the bottom, with nothing left alive or dead that we could see, and it was my brother Diogo de Mello's vessel, and with him went fifteen or twenty members [criados] of my father's household, and of mine, who had gone with him." Pedro Homem, the captain of the other small nau immediately ordered the sails to be furled and a craft set out to rescue the castaways, but they were faced with artillery fire from the Ming fleet and were then boarded until all the Portuguese were killed or captured. On the Chinese side, "Pan Ding-gou (潘丁苟) … was first to board, and the other troops followed and advanced in good order." According to Portuguese sources, Pedro Homem put up an admirable fight, being "in stature one of the largest men of Portugal, and his spirit of bravery and physical strength were different from the common man." He was the last to fall for he wore European plate armour and kept the Chinese at bay with a heavy montante until he was eventually taken down by a cannon shot. His death is corroborated by Portuguese sources, which say that "[Pedro Homem's] fighting was such that if it hadn't been for the shots of [Chinese] artillery, he never would have died, so great was the fear of the Chinese to approach him."

The Chinese killed almost everyone on board the carrack and made several prisoners before abandoning it, taking with them the cannon and even the ropes, anchors, and pulleys. A sole survivor was left behind - a sailor that had taken refuge on the crow's nest.

In the meantime, the two heavy carracks and António do Rego's junk ship successfully repelled all boarding attempts, forcing the Chinese to abandon pursuit with severe losses. Only by night fall did the wind allow the Portuguese to return to the drifting carrack and rescue its last survivor. The carrack was burnt to prevent the Chinese from capturing it. Afterwards, Martim Afonso de Mello gathered a council with his captains, in which he expressed his intentions of renewing battle the following day, but the rest of the captains saw it as a pointless exercise and objected. The Portuguese then proceeded to Malacca, and despite being off-season, encountered favourable winds that carried them to the Singapore Strait, where they met up with Duarte Coelho and his junk.

== Aftermath ==
After the battle, Wang Hong presented 20 captured Portuguese cannons and other firearms to the imperial court. He Ru was ordered to begin manufacturing breech-loading cannons in the same style as the captured Portuguese breech-loading swivel guns, which were called "Folangji" (佛郎機), meaning "Frankish" in Chinese. He Ru was promoted in 1523 and completed the first folangji cannons in 1524.

Forty two men were captured and taken into custody by the Chinese. On 6 December 1522, Portuguese prisoners were exposed to the public in pillories in Guangzhou. Their sentences read that "Petty sea robbers sent by the great robber falsely; they come to spy out our country; let them die in pillories as robbers." Ming officials forced Pires to write letters for them, demanding that the Portuguese restore the deposed Malaccan Sultan back to his throne. The Malay ambassador, who refused to leave fearing that the Portuguese would kill him, was forced to take the letters with him on a junk to Patani. It left Guangzhou on 31 May 1523, and brought back an urgent request for help against the Portuguese from the Malay Sultan. Dom Sancho Henriques' forces were attacking Bintang and Patani. When they received his reply, the Chinese officials sentenced the Portuguese embassy to death. On 23 September 1523, 23 Portuguese were executed by slow slicing, and their genitals were stuffed into their mouths. When more Portuguese ships landed and were seized, the Chinese executed them as well, cutting off the genitalia and beheading the bodies and forcing their fellow Portuguese to wear the body parts, while the Chinese celebrated with music. The genitalia and heads were strung up for display in public, after which they were discarded.

In 1524 the Chinese sent the Malay ambassadors Tuan Mohammed and Cojacao back to Bintang with messages for the Portuguese. They got lost at sea.

On 1 January 1524, Jorge de Albuquerque wrote a letter to the King of Portugal requesting him to send the captain-major, because he feared that the Chinese would send a fleet to Malacca and punish the Portuguese for destroying the Sultanate. The Chinese on their part feared possible Portuguese retaliation, and in 1524 constructed a new fleet of war junks in preparation for future Portuguese incursions. However, the attacks were not forthcoming, and the fleet was left to decay. The new fleet's ships were either scuttled or captured by pirates. By 1528 no new ships were being constructed.

Thwarted by Cantonese authorities, the Portuguese avoided Guangdong after Sincouwan and moved their operations north along the Fujian coastline for the next thirty years with the aid of local merchants with official connections. They formed a group of smugglers and pirates composed of Fujianese, Japanese, and Portuguese mariners. However this came to a stop with the appointment of Zhu Wan in 1547 as special grand coordinator to stamp out piracy in Zhejiang and Fujian. In 1548 Zhu Wan carried out a raid on Shuangyu, a pirate base off the coast of Zhejiang. In 1549 the Portuguese abandoned their goods after realizing the new administration had made it impossible for them to conduct business, and moved back south to Guangdong. Zhu Wan's success was short-lived, and he was convicted of wrongful executions by his enemies the same year. He eventually committed suicide.

The new Portuguese trading presence in Guangdong got off to a solid start in 1554 when the merchants Leonel de Sousa and Simão d'Almeida offered bribes to Wang Bo, the vice-commissioner for maritime defense. After a pleasant reception from the Portuguese merchants on their ships, the two sides agreed to a payment of 500 taels per year made personally to Wang Bo in return for allowing the Portuguese to settle in Macau as well as levying the imperial duty of 20 percent on only half their products. Following 1557 the Portuguese were no longer asked to leave Macau during winter.

The Malay Sultanate of Johor also improved relations with the Portuguese and fought alongside them against the Aceh Sultanate.

== Location ==
The official History of Ming notes that the battle happened in Xicaowan (西草灣) of Xinhui County. However, the name "Xicaowan" is obscure in the modern era, causing the actual location of the battle to be debated amongst specialists. The early Japanese reseacher Toyohachi Fujita, not finding the name Xicaowan in the maps available to him, was convinced that "Xicaowan" was an error and suggested that it should be "Nancaowan" (南草灣) of Xinning County (新寧縣, now Taishan) in the vicinity of Guanghai. This was corroborated by Huang Wenkuan, who pointed out that there is no "Nancaowan" in the area but a "Fucaowan" (甫草灣), believing this was the bay Fujita meant.

In the 1980s, Hong Kong historian Lin Tien-wei proposed that the name "Xicaowan" is a variant of Sai Tso Wan (Chinese: 茜草灣; pinyin: Xīcǎowān; Jyutping: Sai1 cou2 waan1) off Lantau Island in Hong Kong. He reasoned that the record "Xinhui County" should instead be "Xin'an County", which governed modern-day Hong Kong during the late Ming dynasty. However, Xin'an County was established in 1573, half a century after the battle, making it unlikely that the original writer meant to write Xin'an instead of Xinhui. Additionally, the variant name (茜 instead of 西) only started to appear in historical records two hundred years later during the Qing dynasty.

Thorough reexaminations of the available Ming sources in the 21st century affirmed that "Xicaowan" had been consistently used in sources near-contemporaneous to the battle, including in the Mingshan Storehouse (名山藏) text by He Qiaoyuan, the Ming Shizong Shilu, Record of the Office of the Supreme Commander at Cangwu (蒼梧總督軍門志), the General Record of Guangdong, and the Quanhai Tuzhu (全海圖注; 'Complete annotated map of the sea'). According to the maps in these sources, "Xicaowan" should be in the vicinity of the channel formerly known as Shizimen, between Macau and Hengqin. Strictly speaking, this location belonged to Xiangshan County, not Xinhui, which Chinese researcher Shi Cunlong admitted to be "not completely satisfying", but reasoned that the maritime boundaries between counties were not clearly established during the Ming dynasty.

== See also ==
- Wugongchuan
- Kau Keng Shan
- Fernão Pires de Andrade
- Western imperialism in Asia
