= History of China–Portugal relations =

Much of the history of China–Portugal relations revolved around the Portuguese colony of Macau.

== First Sino-Portuguese contact ==
Sino-Portuguese relations began when Jorge Álvares arrived in the southern city of Guangzhou in 1513. Around then, Portugal established trading activities in what is now known as Southern China, gradually expanded into Macau and paid rent to the Ming Empire.

The first official Portuguese visit was Fernão Pires de Andrade mission to Guangzhou (1517–1518) during the Ming Dynasty (1368–1644). It was fairly successful, and the local Chinese authorities allowed the embassy, led by Tomé Pires and brought by de Andrade's flotilla, to proceed to Beijing. Tomé Pires' impression of the Chinese was that they were "white like us [brancos como nós], the greater part of them dressing in cotton cloth and silk". His full account also compares them to the Germans and the women whom he describes as "of our whiteness" and similar in appearance to Spanish ladies.

Relations between the Portuguese and Chinese soured when Fernão's brother Simão de Andrade arrived with a fleet at Guangzhou in 1519. He disregarded the country's laws and customs and built a fort on Tamão Island under the pretext of a threat of piracy. He built a gallows there and executed one of his own sailors there for some offense, which greatly offended the local Chinese authorities. He attacked a Chinese official who protested against the Portuguese captain's demands that his vessels should take precedence in trade with China before those from other countries. Simão's engaged in the slave trade and the purchase of Chinese children for sale abroad. False rumours spread that the disappearing children were cannibalised after they had been roasted by the Portuguese.

As a result, the Chinese posted an edict banning men with Caucasian features from entering Canton. The Chinese responded by killing multiple Portuguese in Canton and drove the Portuguese back to sea.

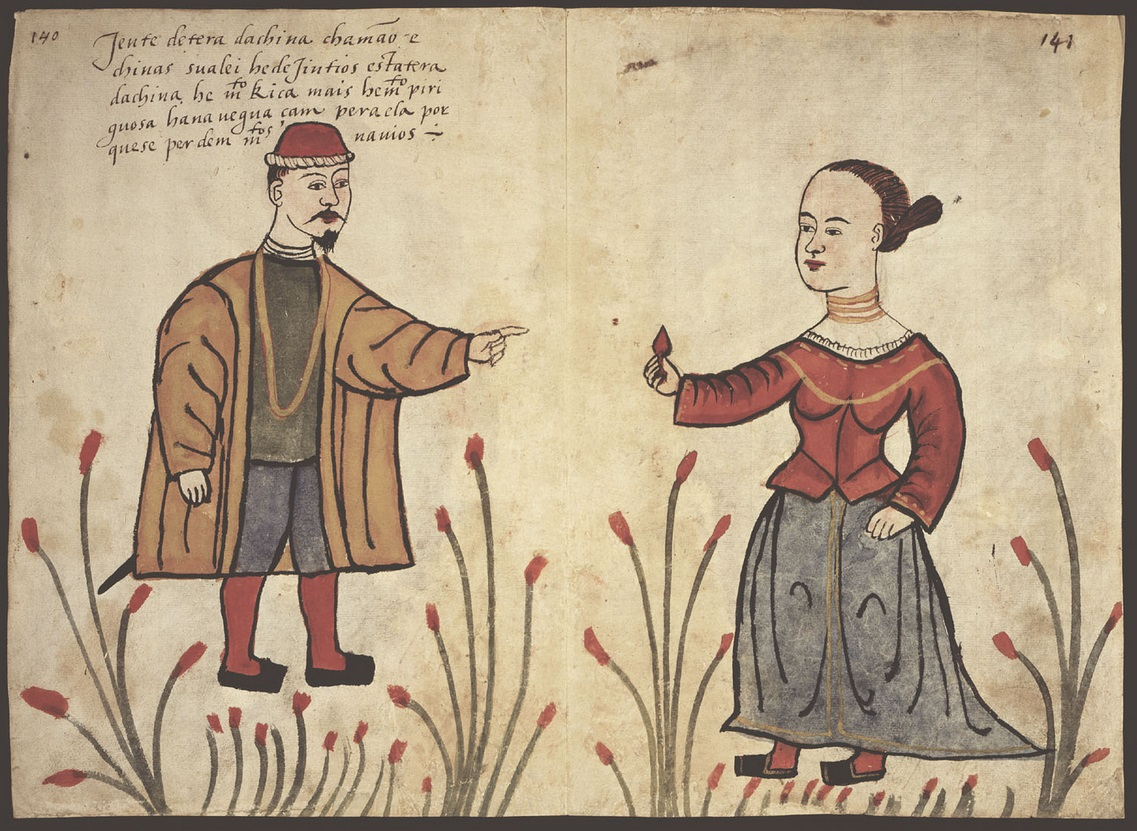
Chinese in the Códice Casanatense, c. 1540

After the Portuguese obtained a trade mission in Ningbo and Quanzhou, they raided the Chinese ports. The Portuguese began trading in Ningbo around 1522. By 1542, the Portuguese had a sizable community in Ningbo (or, more likely, on nearby small islands). Portuguese activities from their Ningbo base included pillaging and attacking multiple Chinese port cities around Ningbo for plunder and spoil. They also enslaved people during their raids. In retaliation, in 1545 the entire Portuguese community of Ningbo were exterminated by Chinese forces. The resulting complaints made it to the province's governor who commanded the settlement destroyed in 1548.

The later antagonism of Chinese toward foreigners was a result of the "reprehensible" behavior of first Portuguese who made contact. Though the frequency of Portuguese piracy was not comparable to the surge in Wokou attacks experienced after the Ming Dynasty attempted to enforce its Haijin policy.

However, with gradual improvement of relations and aid given against the Wokou pirates along China's shores, by 1557 Ming China finally agreed to allow the Portuguese to settle at Macau in a new Portuguese trade colony. The Malay Sultanate of Johor also improved relations with the Portuguese and fought alongside them against the Aceh Sultanate.

== Sino-Malay alliance against Portugal ==
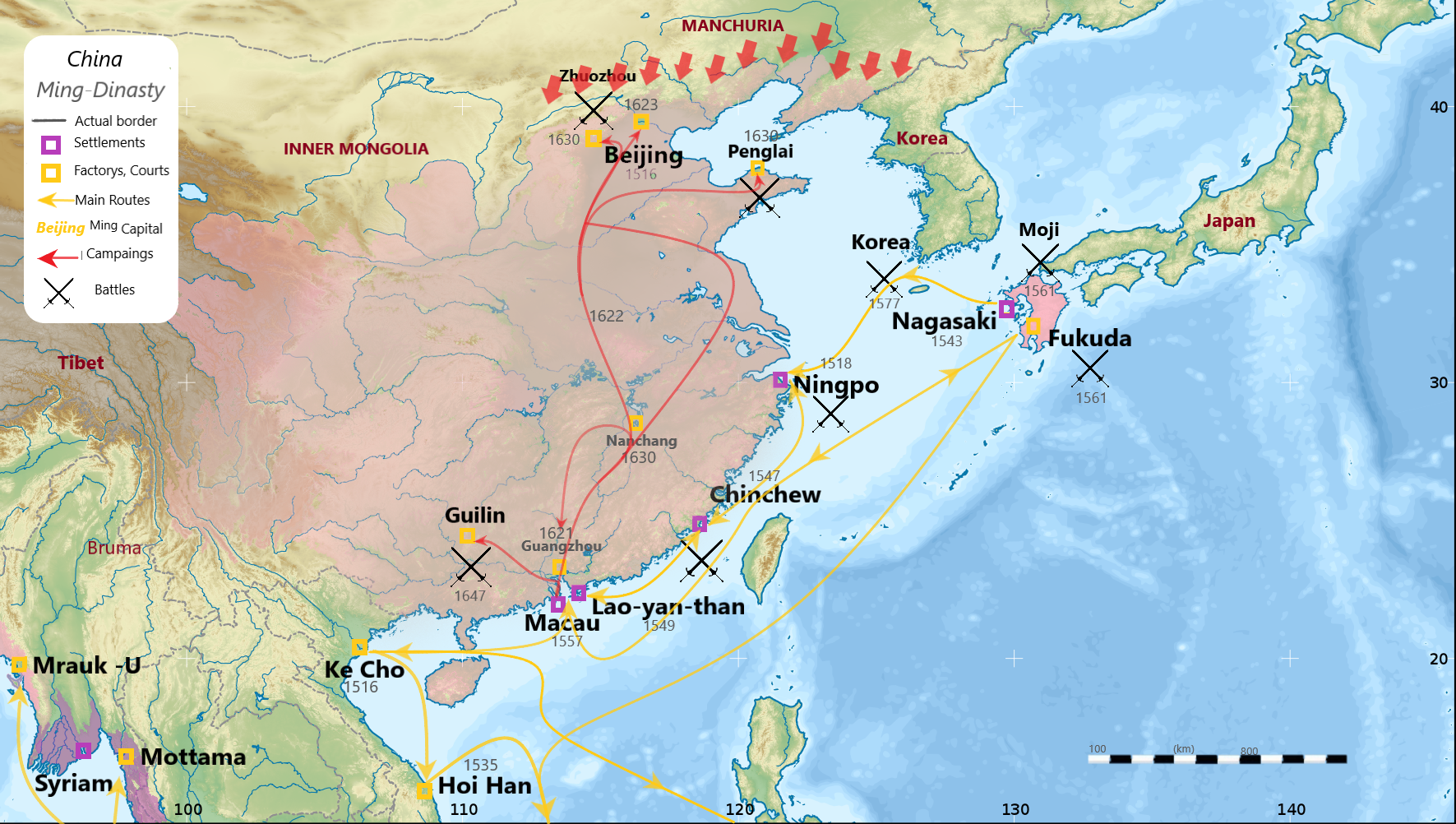
Portuguese Presence in China from the 16th century and major battles

The Malay Malacca Sultanate was a tributary state and ally to Ming Dynasty China. In 1511, Portugal conquered Malacca, a Chinese tributary state, and the Chinese responded with force against Portugal.

The Chinese government imprisoned and executed multiple Portuguese envoys after it had tortured them in Guangzhou. The Malaccans had informed the Chinese of the Portuguese seizure of Malacca, and the Chinese responded with hostility toward the Portuguese. The Malaccans told the Chinese of the deception that the Portuguese had used by disguising plans for conquering territory as mere trading activities and told of all the atrocities committed by the Portuguese. The Malaccan Sulatan had been swayed by the international Muslim trading community that the Portuguese posed a grave threat after their capture of Goa. Denied the right to trade and attacked by the Malaccan authorities, the Portuguese resorted to force in Malacca, as in India, to establish themselves as a trading power.

The Malaccan Sultan's lodging of a complaint against the Portuguese invasion to the Chinese Emperor made the Portuguese greeted with hostility from the Chinese when they arrived in China. The Malaccan Sultan, based in Bintan after fleeing Malacca, sent a message to the Chinese, which combined with Portuguese banditry and violent activity in China, led the Chinese authorities to execute 23 Portuguese and to torture the rest of them in jails. After the Portuguese had set up posts for trading in China and committed raids in China, the Chinese responded by completely exterminating the Portuguese in Ningbo and Quanzhou Pires, a Portuguese trade envoy, was among those who died in the Chinese dungeons.

The Chinese defeated a Portuguese fleet at the First Battle of Tamão (1521); the Portuguese retreated with three ships to Malacca, escaping when a wind scattered the Chinese ships as they launched a final attack.

The Chinese effectively held the Portuguese embassy hostage and used it as a bargaining chip to demand the Portuguese to restore the deposed Malaccan Sultan (King) to his throne.

The Chinese proceeded to execute several Portuguese by beating and strangling them and by torturing the rest. The other Portuguese prisoners were put into iron chains and kept in prison. The Chinese confiscated all of the Portuguese property and goods in the Pires embassy's possession.

In 1522, Martim Afonso de Melo Coutinho was appointed commander of another Portuguese fleet sent to establish diplomatic relations. The Chinese defeated the Portuguese ships led by Coutinho at the Second Battle of Tamão (1522). Many Portuguese were captured and ships destroyed during the battle. The Portuguese were forced to retreat to Malacca.

The Chinese forced Pires to write letters for them that demanded the Portuguese to restore the deposed Malaccan Sultan back to his throne. The Malay ambassador to China was to deliver the letter.

The Chinese had sent a message to the deposed sultan (king) of Malacca on the fate of the Portuguese embassy, which the Chinese held prisoner. When they received his reply, the Chinese officials proceeded to executed the Portuguese embassy by slicing their bodies into multiple pieces. Their genitalia were inserted into the oral cavity. The Portuguese were executed in public in multiple areas in Guangzhou deliberately by the Chinese to show that the Portuguese were insignificant in their eyes. When more Portuguese ships landed and were seized by the Chinese, the Chinese then executed them as well by cutting off the genitalia and beheading the bodies and forcing their fellow Portuguese to wear the body parts, while the Chinese celebrated with music. The genitalia and heads were displayed strung up for display in public, and they were then discarded.

In response to Portuguese and their establishment of bases in Fujian at Wuyu island and Moon Harbour at Zhangzhou, Shuangyu Island in Wenzhou and Nan'ao Island in Guangdong, the Imperial Chinese Right Deputy Commander Zhu Wan exterminated Traders and settlers and forcibly razed the Shuangyu Portuguese base to prohibit trading with foreigners by sea.

Chinese traders boycotted Malacca after it fell under Portuguese control, and some Chinese in Java assisted in Muslim attempts to reconquer the city from Portugal by using ships. The Java Chinese participation in failed attempted to conquer the Portuguese Malacca was recorded in "The Malay Annals of Semarang and Cerbon" trading the Chinese did business with Malays and Javanese instead of the Portuguese.

Hostility from the Chinese because of trafficking in Chinese slaves caused a 1595 law to be passed by Portugal that banned selling and buying of Chinese slaves. On 19 February 1624, the King of Portugal forbade the enslavement of Chinese of either sex.

== The deliverance of Macau and trade monopoly ==
Finally, in the early 1550s, the Canton authorities recognized the strategic importance of the “frangues” - these strange barbarians, from far away, skilled in trade, effective in war, but few in number. Gradually, they proved to be useful and less threatening. Disorganized people, acting privately, the adventurers of the China Sea gained negotiating power when the Crown intervened in the Sino-Japanese business and monopolized the China - Japan route. The nobleman Leonel de Sousa arrived in the region in 1553 and managed to negotiate with the mandarins on behalf of all the Portuguese. In 1554, authorization was finally obtained for the establishment at the mouth of the Pearl River, ten years after they began to deal with silver and silk.

For the next 130 years (1555-1685), the Portuguese enjoyed a legal monopoly on seaborne trade between China and Europe. This effectively also meant that Europeans of any nationality and occupation (such as the Italian missionary Matteo Ricci) had to travel to and from China on the Portuguese trading ships, making Portugal the main gateway for transmission of both material and immaterial Chinese culture to Europe. This role was diminished after the revocation of the monopoly allowed the Dutch, French, British and other East India Companies to directly access China without Portuguese mediation.

== Qing dynasty ==
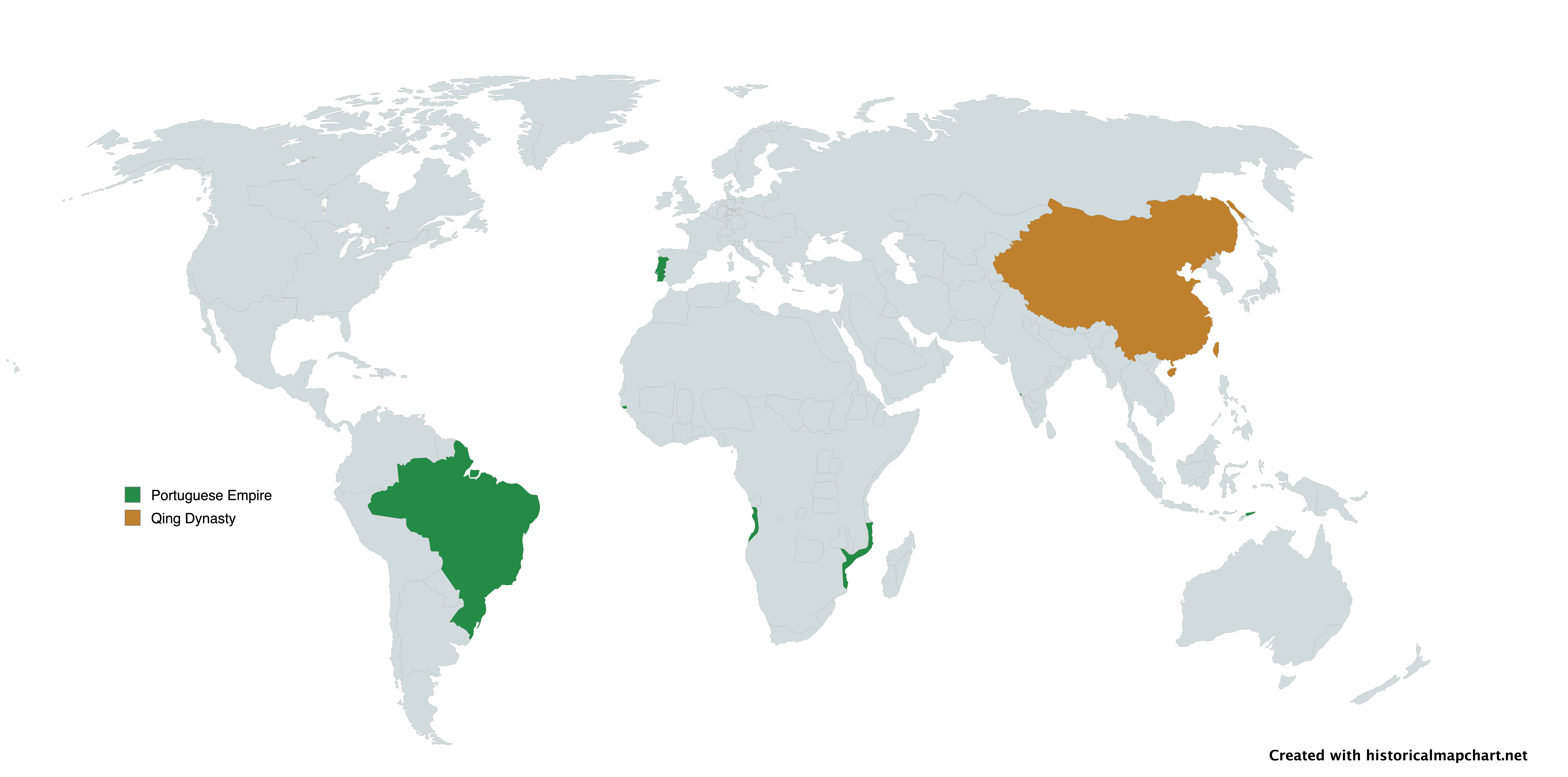
Portugal and China in 1815.

=== Qing dynasty's Ningbo massacre of Portuguese settlers ===
During the Qing dynasty, the Ningbo authorities contracted Cantonese pirates to exterminate and massacre Portuguese who raided Cantonese shipping around Ningbo in the 1800s. The massacre was "successful", with 40 Portuguese dead and only 2 Chinese dead. It was dubbed the "Ningpo massacre" by an English correspondent, who noted that the Portuguese pirates had behaved savagely towards the Chinese and that the Portuguese authorities at Macau should have hindered the pirates.

=== Chinese piracy ===
The decline of authority of the Qing dynasty allowed the rise of numerous pirate groups, active around the commercially important Pearl River Delta, that captured trade vessels, assaulted seaside populations or forced them to pay tribute, but did not interfere with European shipping initially. The most important of these pirate groups became the Red Flag Fleet which, under the leadership of Cheung Po Tsai, had clashed with Portuguese vessels in 1805, but in May 1807 suffered a heavy defeat at the hands of Portuguese lieutenant Pereira Barreto, commanding a two-ship squadron.

After being defeated several times by the Portuguese Navy, on 20 April, Quan Apon Chay formally delivered his fleet and weapons, which now numbered about 280 ships, 2,000 guns and over 25,000 men. The Portuguese claimed naught, which greatly impressed the Chinese. Cheung Po Tsai would in the future make formal visits to the Leal Senado of Macau to meet several of the Portuguese officers present at the fighting, among them Gonçalves Carocha.

=== Baishaling incident ===
Countries which signed cooperation documents related to the Belt and Road Initiative

In 1846, Portugal dispatched João Maria Ferreira do Amaral to serve as governor of Macau. He unilaterally declared Macau a Portuguese colony, stopped annual rent payments to China, occupied the nearby Island of Taipa (which had never been Portuguese territory), and imposed a new series of taxes on Macau residents. In the Baishaling incident, Amaral was ambushed and killed by a group of Chinese villagers he encountered while riding outside the city gates. The Portuguese responded with a surprise attack on a nearby Chinese fort, forcing the Chinese to retreat. This was a milestone in the Portugal's assertion of sovereignty over Macau.

== Sources ==
- This article incorporates text from The rise of Portuguese power in India, 1497–1550, by Richard Stephen Whiteway, a publication from 1899, now in the public domain in the United States.
- This article incorporates text from Historic Macao, by Carlos Augusto Montalto Jesus, a publication from 1902, now in the public domain in the United States.
- This article incorporates text from The works of the English poets, from Chaucer to Cowper: including the series edited with prefaces, biographical and critical, by Samuel Johnson, a publication from 1810, now in the public domain in the United States.
- This article incorporates text from The Percy anecdotes: Original and select, by Sholto Percy, Reuben Percy, a publication from 1826, now in the public domain in the United States.
- This article incorporates text from A history of Japan during the century of early foreign intercourse, 1542–1651, a publication from 1903, now in the public domain in the United States.
- This article incorporates text from A history of Japan, Volume 2, by Joseph Henry Longford, L. M. C. Hall, a publication from 1903, now in the public domain in the United States.
- This article incorporates text from The Mirror of literature, amusement, and instruction, Volume 7, a publication from 1845, now in the public domain in the United States.
- Keevak, Michael (18 April 2011). Becoming Yellow: A Short History of Racial Thinking. Princeton and Oxford: Princeton University Press. ISBN 978-1-4008-3860-8.
- Ptak, Roderich (1992), "Early Sino-Portuguese relations up to the Foundation of Macao", Mare Liberum, Revista de História dos Mares (4), Lisbon
