= Battle of Tunmen =

1521 naval battle between Ming and Portuguese

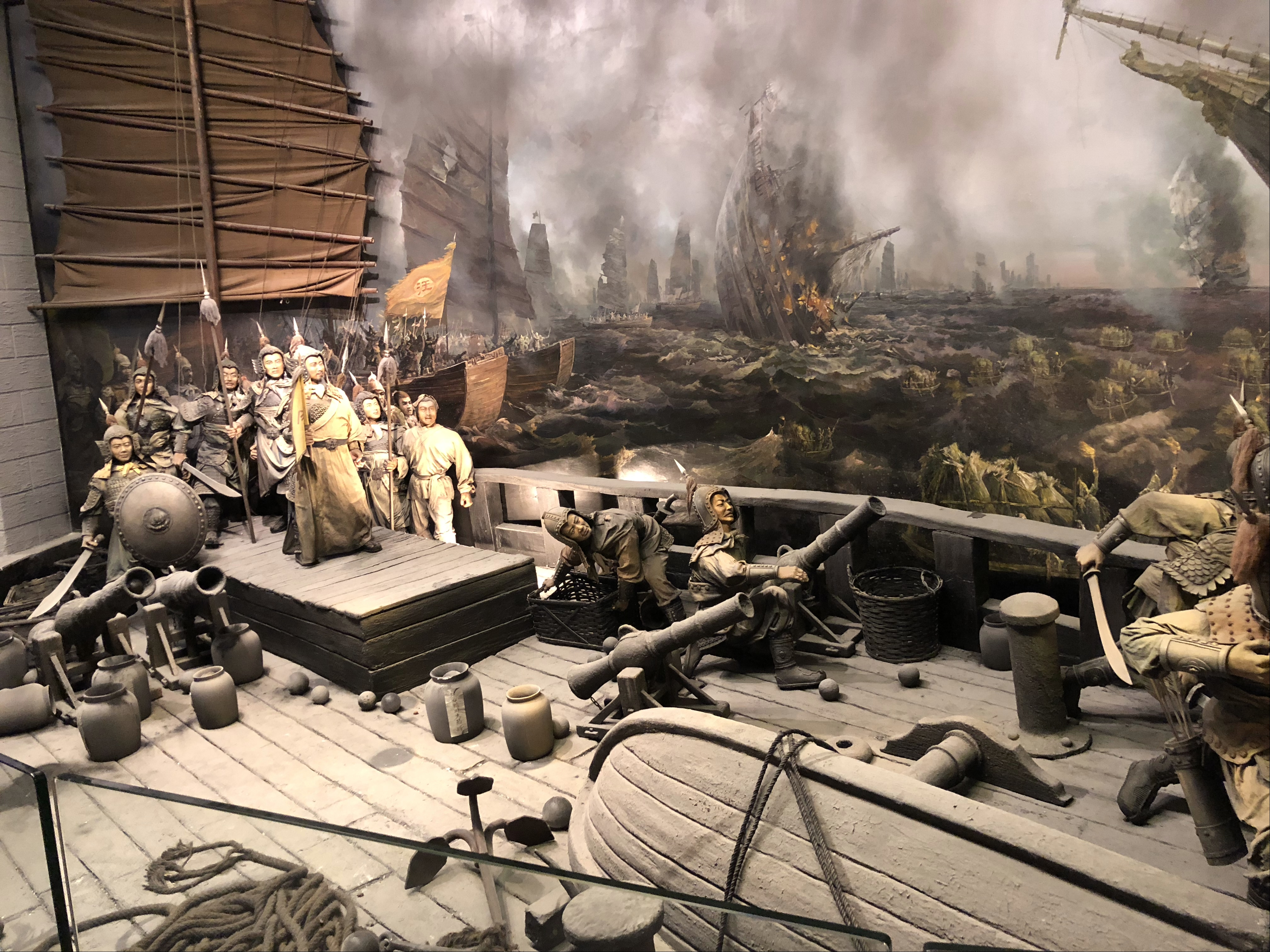
- Imagined scenes of Battle of Tunmen
Date	June 21 – September 8, 1521
Location	Tamão
Result	Ming victory

Belligerents
Ming dynasty	Kingdom of Portugal

Commanders and leaders
Wang Hong	Diogo Calvo; Duarte Coelho; Ambrósio do Rego

Strength
50+ Junks	5 Caravels; Siamese and Patani junks

Casualties and losses
Unknown	2 Caravels abandoned all junks abandoned

Battle of Tunmen

Chinese name
- Traditional Chinese: 屯門海戰
- Simplified Chinese: 屯门海战
Transcriptions
Standard Mandarin
- Hanyu Pinyin: Tún Mén hǎizhàn
Yue: Cantonese
- Jyutping: tyun4 mun4 hoi2 zin3

Portuguese name
- Portuguese: Batalha de Tamão

The Battle of Tunmen or the Battle of Tamão was a naval battle in which the Ming imperial navy defeated a Portuguese fleet led by Diogo Calvo in 1521.

== Background ==
Portuguese diplomat Fernão Pires de Andrade arrived at the mouth of the Pearl River in June 1517 and asked the naval commander of Nantou for permission to take his ships to Guangzhou. After a month with no definitive reply, Andrade decided to sail up the river to Guangzhou without permission from Ming authorities. When they arrived the Portuguese ships discharged cannon fire as a friendly salute, however this was not seen as a friendly gesture by the local Chinese, who were greatly alarmed by the noise. The Portuguese explained that the Chinese traders did the same thing in Malacca, but the local officials only became even more suspicious as Chinese overseas trade was forbidden under Ming law. When official reception from Guangzhou arrived, tensions relaxed, and the Portuguese were received with much pomp as well as the right to trade their goods for silk and porcelain. Tomé Pires and seven other Portuguese as well as their slaves were given lodging for the embassy. A Portuguese record states that they had made a good impression.

Andrade's negotiations with Ming officials were thwarted when his brother Simão de Andrade arrived in August 1519. Simão immediately made a bad impression upon the locals of Tunmen, who had previously been open to all foreigners. Upon arriving with three ships, Simão executed a Portuguese citizen and built a fort on Tunmen, barring other foreigners from conducting trade. When a Ming official arrived to inquire as to the situation, Simão became aggressive and knocked off his hat. Following this, Simão began purchasing as well as kidnapping child slaves along the Chinese coast to sell in Portuguese Malacca. Even children from well-off families were stolen and found years later at Diu in western India. Rumors that Simão and other Portuguese were cannibalizing children for food spread across China. Simão's pirating activities greatly angered both the Chinese people and the court, which led Ming officials to order the eviction of the Tunmen Portuguese.

The Portuguese embassy arrived in Nanjing in May 1520, but news of Simão de Andrade's conduct had reached Beijing, as had the ambassadors from the exiled King of Malacca bringing complaints about the Portuguese. Ming officials sent memorials to the throne that condemned the Portuguese conquest of Malacca and advocated for the rejection of their embassy. The Zhengde Emperor died on 20 April 1521. The newly appointed Grand Secretary, Yang Tinghe, announced the rejection of the Portuguese embassy the day following the emperor's death. The Portuguese embassy left for Guangzhou, where they arrived in September.

== Battle ==
The Portuguese refused to comply with eviction orders from Tunmen that arrived from Beijing. In response, commander Wang Hong assembled a squadron of fifty ships and imposed a blockade on the Portuguese as well as the Siamese and Patani junks they had requisitioned. The battle, which occurred in April or May, began with direct boarding action by the Ming fleet, but the fleet was unable to draw close due to the superior range of the Portuguese guns. The enclosed terrain was also to the Portuguese's advantage; the Ming encirclement proved detrimental to the attackers. Subsequently, Wang Hong sent in a screen of fire ships to trap the Portuguese. Although the Portuguese managed to evade the fire attack, they were unsuccessful in evading Ming's boarding attempts and the fighting took a heavy toll on Portuguese manpower. Eventually, the Portuguese realized it was not possible to sail all five ships with their remaining men. They were forced to abandon two ships, as well as the rest of their junks, to make their escape. A strong wind arose at this point and scattered the pursuing Ming fleet, which allowed the Portuguese to retreat and make their way to Malacca in October.

== Aftermath ==
Despite hostilities, the Portuguese continued to trade along the Fujian coastline with the aid of corrupt local merchants. Simão de Andrade's activities also continued for decades after he left Guangzhou in 1520, and he sailed to Xiamen and Ningbo where he established settlements. Simão eventually ran afoul of a trade deal and was double crossed by a local in 1545. In response Simão sent a band of armed men into the town, pillaged it, and took their women and young girls as captives. This led to a punitive expedition by the locals, however, who banded together and slaughtered the Portuguese under Simão. The Portuguese also accosted other foreigners. In one instance Coelho de Sousa seized the house of a wealthy foreign resident in Jinzhou of Fujian. Ming authorities responded by cutting off supplies to the Portuguese and the Portuguese ransacked a nearby village for supplies. In retaliation, the Ming destroyed 13 of their ships. Thirty Portuguese survivors fled further south to Guangdong in 1549.

The new Portuguese trading presence in Guangdong got off to a solid start in 1554 when the merchants Leonel de Sousa and Simão d'Almeida offered bribes to Wang Bo, the vice-commissioner for maritime defense. After a pleasant reception from the Portuguese merchants on their ships, the two sides agreed to a payment of 500 taels per year made personally to Wang Bo in return for allowing the Portuguese to settle in Macau as well as levying the imperial duty of 20 percent on only half their products. Following 1557 the Portuguese were no longer asked to leave Macau during winter. The Portuguese ambassador Diogo Pereira arrived in 1563 to normalize relations. Portuguese presence in Macau was further strengthened in 1568 when they aided the Ming in fighting off a hundred pirate ships. The nature of Wang Bo's business transactions were almost discovered by imperial observers in 1571, but the vice-commissioner obfuscated the payments by identifying them as "ground rent" made to the imperial treasury. Macau's merchant oligarchs continued to bribe their mandarin overseers and in this way the settlement persisted. The most important incident of bribery occurred in 1582 when the viceroy of Guangdong and Guangxi summoned Macau's chief officials for a meeting. Remembering the fate of Tomé Pires decades earlier, Macau's leaders chose an elderly judge and Italian Jesuit to go in their place. The viceroy raged at the Macau representatives, accusing them of conducting governance in contravention of Ming law, and threatened to destroy the colony and evict all Portuguese from Macau. His attitude changed dramatically after the two presented him with 4,000 cruzados worth of presents. In his words: "The foreigners, subjects to the laws of the Empire, may continue to inhabit Macao."

The Malay Sultanate of Johor also improved relations with the Portuguese and fought alongside them against the Aceh Sultanate.

== Location ==
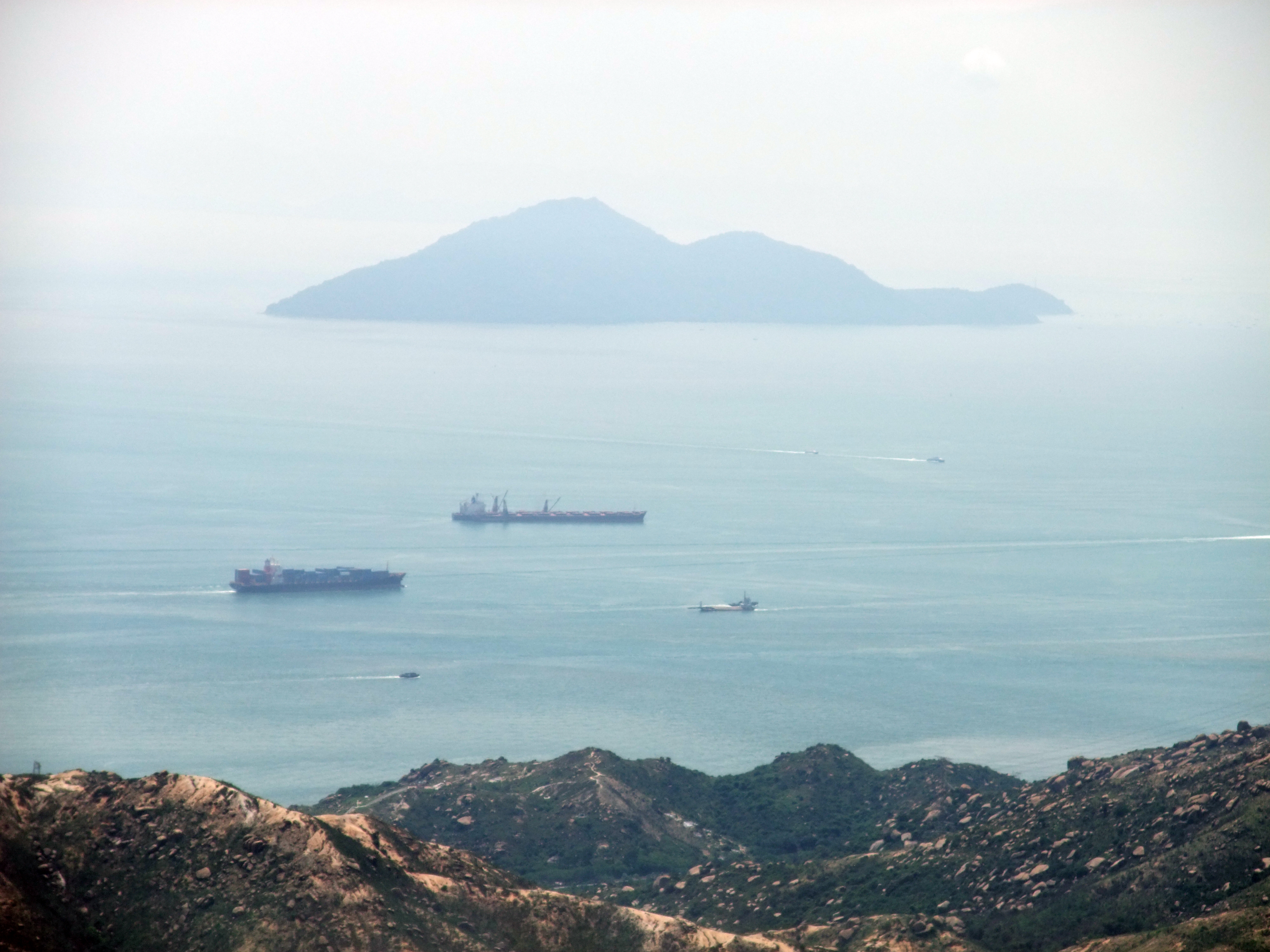
Looking towards Lintin Island from Castle Peak, Tuen Mun

The precise location of the battle has never been established.

The Portuguese called their settlement Tamão, which is understood as a corruption of "Tunmen" (traditional Chinese: 屯門; simplified Chinese: 屯门; Sidney Lau: Tuen^{⁴}Moon^{⁴}), the name for the western Hong Kong and Shenzhen area that has existed since the Tang dynasty. Chinese sources state that the Portuguese settled around the Tunmen Inlet (Chinese: 屯門澳; Sidney Lau: Tuen^{⁴}Moon^{⁴}O^{³}), but the current whereabouts of the Tunmen Inlet is unknown, so the precise location of the Portuguese settlement and the battlefield remains under debate among historians.

In the present day, "Tunmen" refers to Tuen Mun, the Cantonese reading of the same Chinese characters. This leads some researchers to link the Tunmen of Ming times to Tuen Mun in the New Territories of Hong Kong. "Tunmen Inlet" would then refer to one of two bays around Tuen Mun: Castle Peak Bay, next to the current Tuen Mun New Town; or Deep Bay between the New Territories and Nantou in present-day Shenzhen, where a Ming coastal defense force was stationed.

Adding to the confusion is the description in Portuguese sources that Tamão was an island. As Tuen Mun is not an island, researchers have proposed that Tamão actually refers to one of the nearby islands. Lintin Island, west of Tuen Mun, is commonly accepted in Western academia as one of the more likely possibilities, while the much larger Lantau Island has also been suggested.

== See also ==
- Battle of Xicaowan
- Wugongchuan
- Cambodian–Spanish War
- Kau Keng Shan
- Fernão Pires de Andrade

== Bibliography ==
- Andrade, Tonio (2016), The Gunpowder Age: China, Military Innovation, and the Rise of the West in World History, Princeton University Press, ISBN 978-0-691-13597-7.
- Chang, Tien Tse (1978), Sino Portuguese Trade from 1514 to 1644: A Synthesis of Portuguese and Chinese Sources, Ams Pr Inc, ISBN 0-40456906-4.
- Chase, Kenneth (2003), Firearms: A Global History to 1700, Cambridge University Press, ISBN 0-521-82274-2.
- Diffie, Bailey W. (1977), Foundations of the Portuguese Empire: 1415–1580, University of Minnesota Press.
- Douglas, Robert Kennaway (2006), Europe and the Far East, Adamant Media Corporation
- Dutra, Francis A. (1995) [October 1993], Proceedings of the International Colloquium on the Portuguese and the Pacific, Santa Barbara, CA, US: University of California.
- Hao, Zhidong (2010), Macau History and Society, HKU Press, ISBN 978-988802854-2.
- Monteiro, Saturnino (1995), Portuguese Sea Battles, vol. II. Christianity, Commerce and Corso 1522–1538, Saturnino Monteiro.
- Pires, Tomé (1990), The Suma Oriental of Tomé Pires, Asian Educational Services.
- Twitchett, Denis C. (1998), The Cambridge History of China: Volume 8, The Ming Dynasty, Part 2; Parts 1368-1644, Cambridge University Press.
- Williams, S. Wells (1897), A History of China: Being the History Chapters From "The Middle Kingdom", New York: Charles Scribner's Sons
- Wills, John E. (2011), China and Maritime Europe, 1500–1800: Trade, Settlement, Diplomacy, and Missions, Cambridge University Press.
