= Nei Lingding Island =

Island of Guangdong Province, China

Coordinates: 22°24′46″N 113°48′13″E

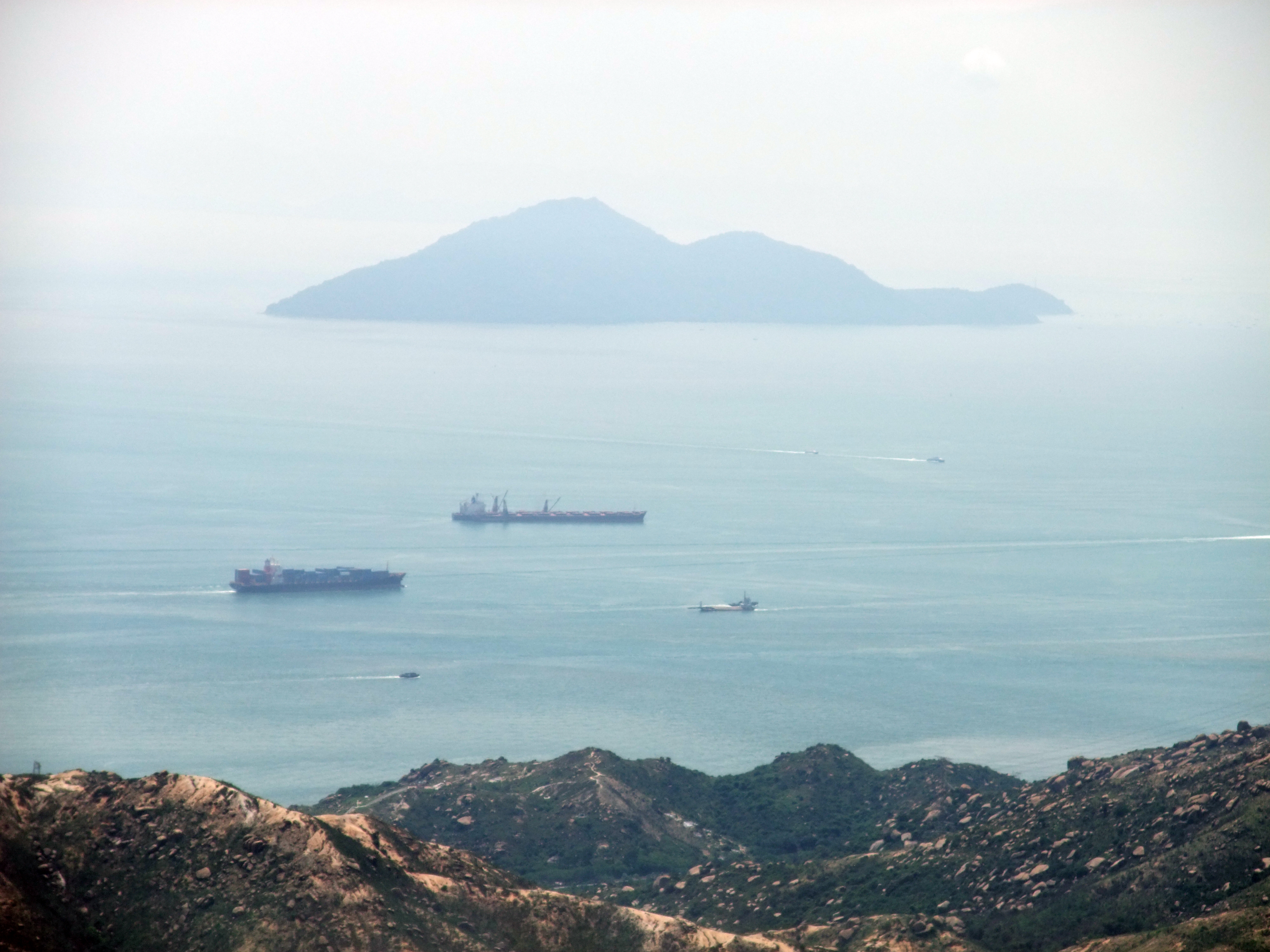
- Nei Lingding Island from Castle Peak, Hong Kong
- Traditional Chinese: 內伶仃島
- Simplified Chinese: 内伶仃岛
- Postal: Lintin Island
- Literal meaning: Inner Lonely Island
Transcriptions
Standard Mandarin
- Hanyu Pinyin: Nèi Língdīng Dǎo
Yue: Cantonese
- Jyutping: noi6 ling4 ding1 dou2

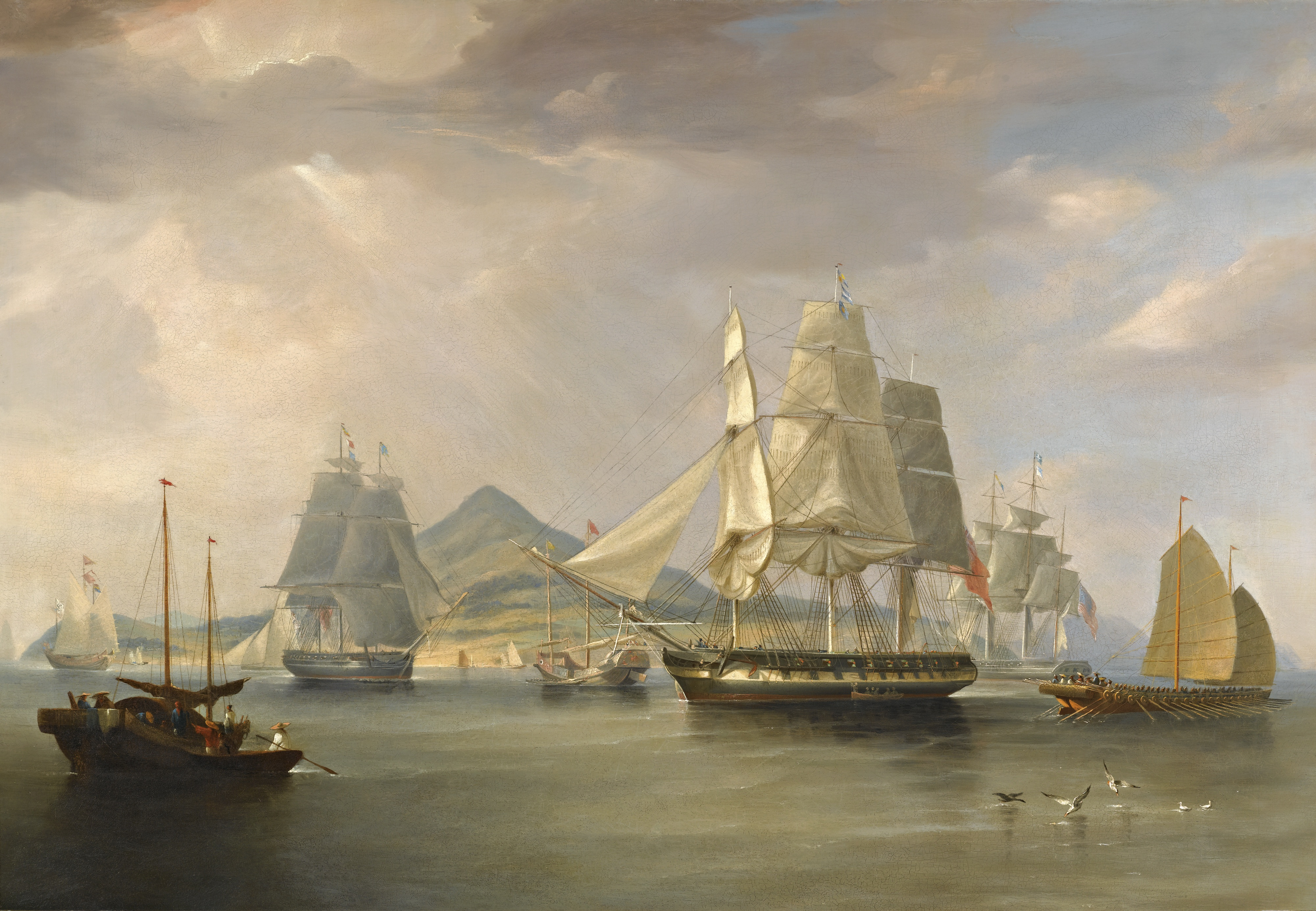
Opium ships at Lintin in 1824, by William John Huggins

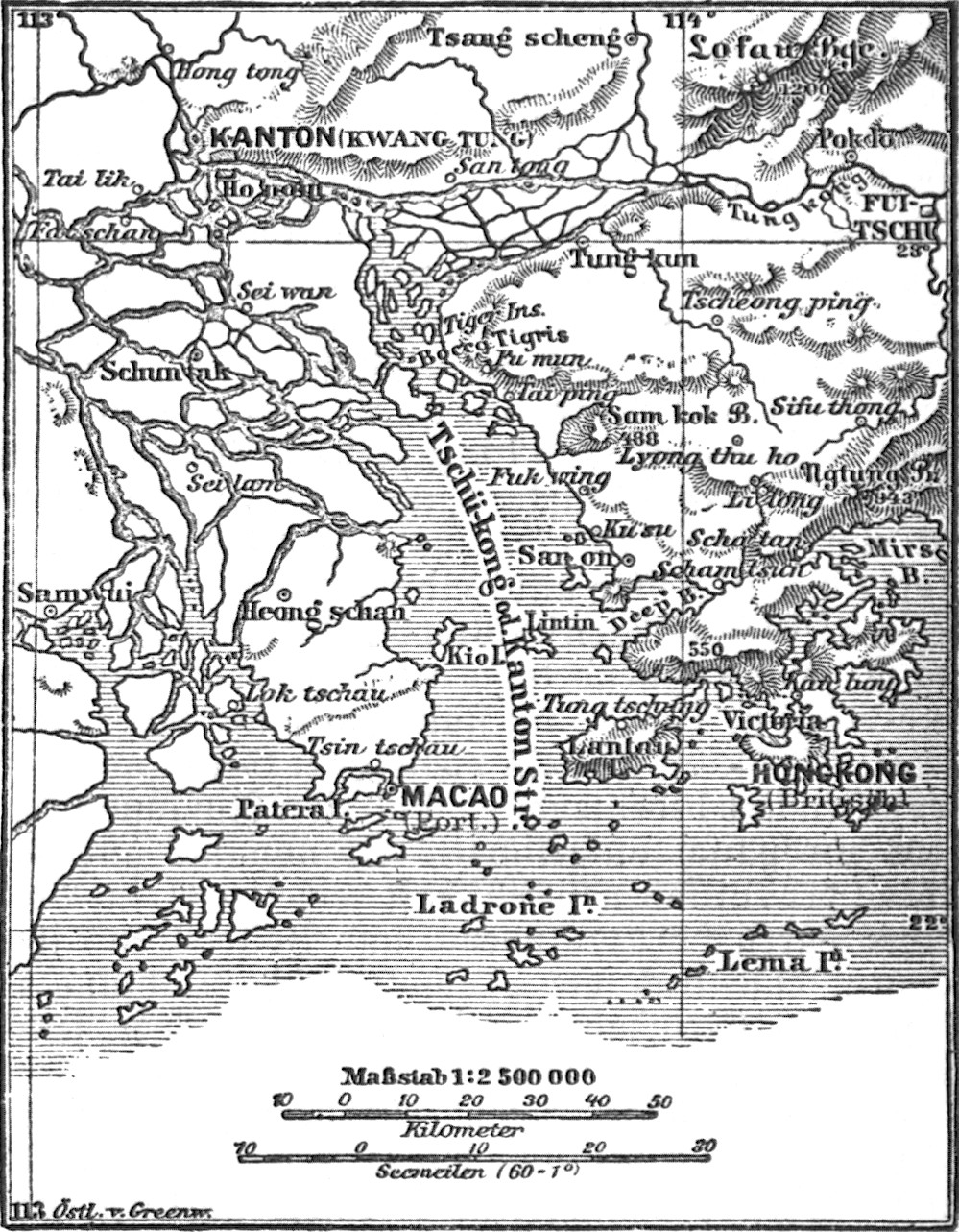
A 19th-century German map shows "Lintin Island" in the middle of the Pearl River Estuary

Nei or Inner Lingding Island, formerly romanized as Lintin or Lin Tin Island, is an island in the Pearl River estuary in the southeastern Chinese province of Guangdong. Although it is located closer to the eastern (Hong Kong and Shenzhen) shore of the estuary, it was until 2009 administratively part of the prefecture-level city of Zhuhai, whose main administrative center is located on the west shore of the river. The jurisdiction of Nei Lingding Island was handed over to Shenzhen in 2009.

== History ==
In May 1513, the Portuguese explorer Jorge Álvares arrived at an island near the coast of China they called "Tamão". (Note: Braga, cited in Cultural Heritage Assessment) This was the first contact of Europeans with China via the sea route around the Cape of Good Hope. Tamão was fortified by Simão de Andrade and reclaimed by the Chinese during the expulsion of the Portuguese in the 1520s. Western scholarship, following J. M. Braga, generally contends that this "Tamão" is Nei Lingding, the main island in the mouth of the Pearl River, 6 km off the coast of the mainland. Recent Chinese scholarship finds this identification to be insufficiently proven, however, and suggests a number of other potential islands including the nearby and far larger Lantau Island.

As of 1814 Nei Lingding (then romanized as "Lintin") was called the "outer anchorage" for European ships traveling to Canton (Guangzhou). They would have to stop at the island, have their cargo inspected and measured by the Chinese customs officials stationed at the island, and pay customs duties. In 1821, when the Chinese government prohibited importation of opium into the country's ports, Lintin became a base for drug smugglers; hulks of old boats, anchored near the island, served as warehouses and depots where imported opium would be reloaded onto smaller boats to be smuggled into Guangzhou and other ports. Edmund Roberts visited the island in 1832, and noted that there were "seven to eight ships" smuggling opium, including American boats. From the 1830s until the cession of Hong Kong in the 1840s, Lintin Island was the main base for British merchants in the Pearl River Delta area. The island was also a stopping point during monsoon season for ship repair. Ships would stay on the island upwards of six months.

== Demographics ==
As of 1814, the population was estimated to be less than 60; in 1821, it was just under 2,000. When Edmund Roberts visited in 1832, he noted a population of approximately 5,000.

== Nature reserve ==
Since 1984, a part of the island has been designated the "Neilingding Island and Futian (福田) Nature Reserve". The reserve covers 7.8 square kilometers (3.0 sq mi), including 4.5 square kilometers (1.7 sq mi) of land area and 3 square kilometers (1.2 sq mi) of mangrove forest, and was created to protect some 300 rhesus macaques and other animals, such as pangolins and pythons.

== See also ==
- Wai Lingding Island ('Outer Lingding Island') lies some 40 kilometers (25 mi) to the southeast in the Wanshan Archipelago.
