= Kau Keng Shan =

Hill in Tuen Mun, Hong Kong

Kau Keng Shan, Hong Kong
- 九逕山
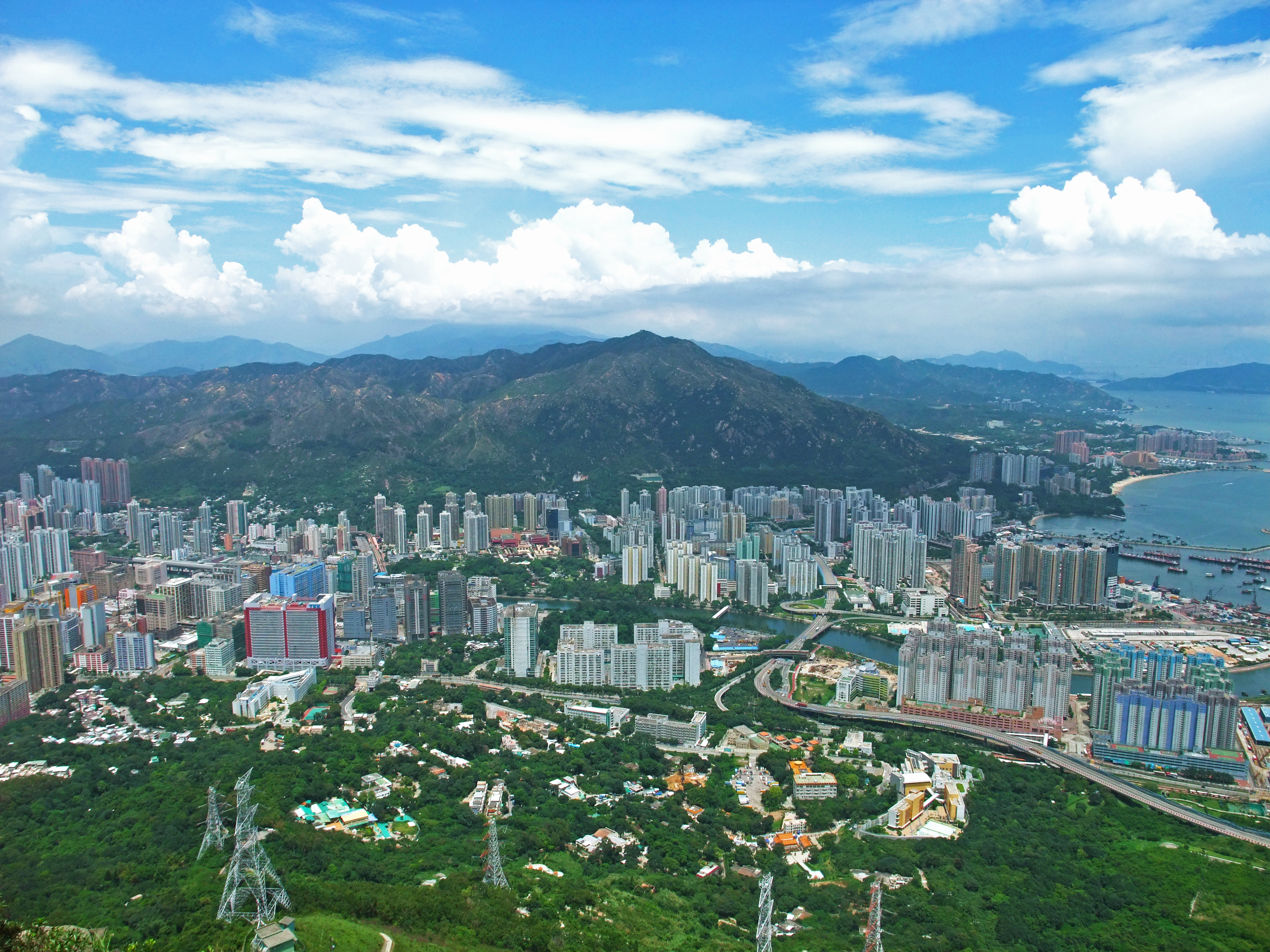
- View of Kau Keng Shan from Castle Peak in July 2008

Highest point
- Elevation: 507 m (1,663 ft)
- Coordinates: 22.3888°N 113.995°E

Geography
- Location within Hong Kong
- Location: Hong Kong

Kau Keng Shan (Cantonese: 九逕山, Yale romanisation: gáu ging shāan) is a hill in Tuen Mun, the New Territories, Hong Kong and stands opposite from Castle Peak. Kau Keng Shan has a height of 507 metres (1,663 ft). During the Ming dynasty era (1368–1644), the area around the hill was used as a defence position against foreign forces, in particular the Portuguese, who had occupied Tuen Mun from 1514 to 1521 (see Tamão).

== See also ==
- List of mountains, peaks and hills in Hong Kong
- Castle Peak
- Tuen Mun
