= Yale romanization =

The Yale romanizations are four romanization systems created at Yale University for the following four East Asian language group:

- Yale romanization of Mandarin
- Yale romanization of Cantonese
- Yale romanization of Korean
- JSL romanization, a system for the Japanese language which is sometimes called "Yale romanization".
