= Toyohachi Fujita =

Japanese writer and professor (1869–1929)

Toyohachi Fujita

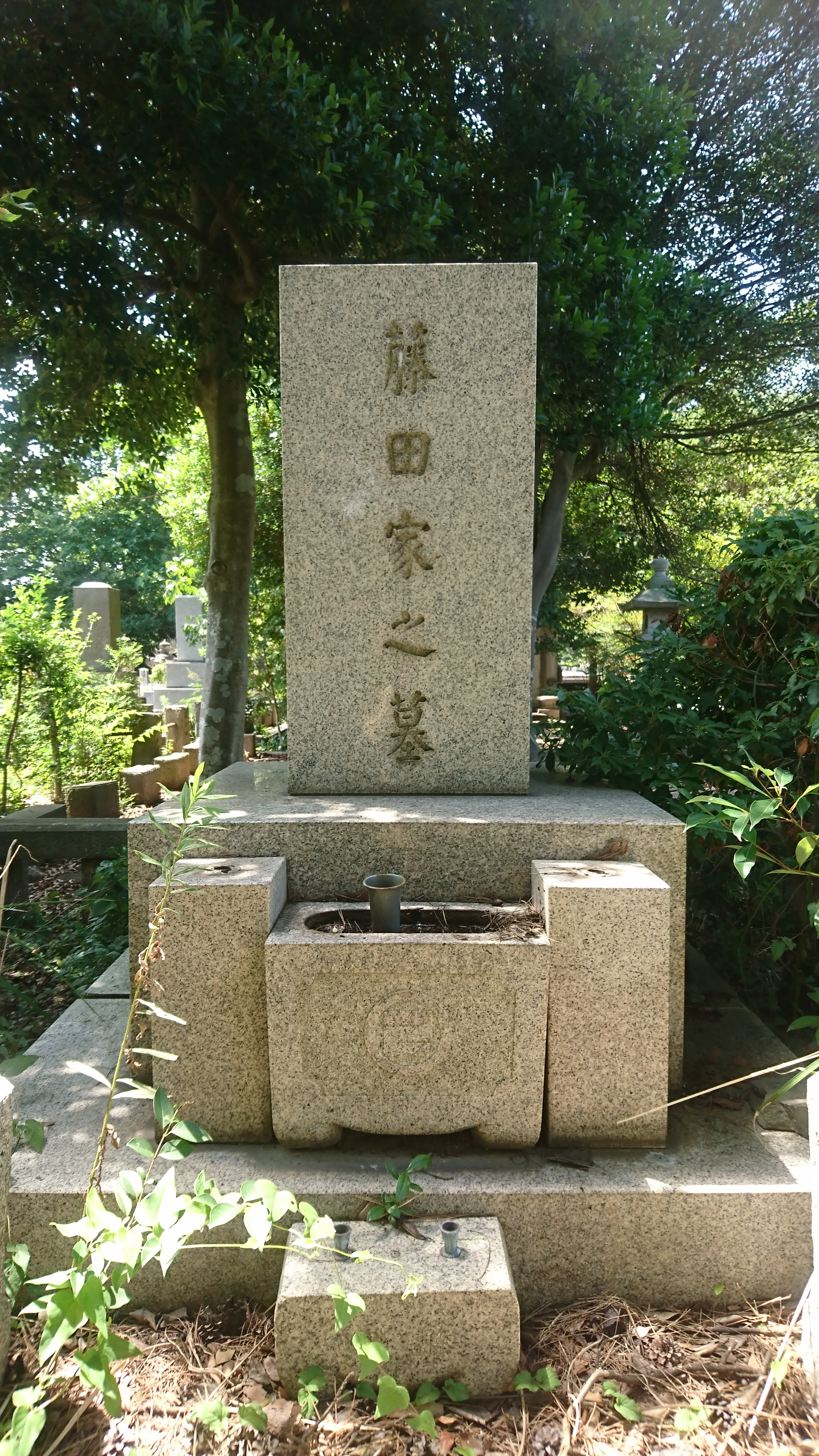
Grave of Toyohachi Fujita

Toyohachi Fujita (藤田 豊八, Fujita Toyohachi; October 19, 1869 – July 15, 1929) was a Japanese writer and professor in East Asian History. He was from Tokushima Prefecture. His (Chinese) pen name was Jianfeng / Kenfou (劍峰). He founded a school in Jiangsu, China. He was a teacher at Beijing University (the Imperial University, 京師大學堂) and an early author of textbooks on East Asian history for secondary schools. He collected over 1700 Chinese books. After he died, those were sent to the Tōyō Bunko and put into a section called Fujita Bunko (藤田文庫).

== Life ==
In 1869, Fujita was born in Awa Province (Tokushima). In 1895 he graduated from the University of Tokyo Liberal arts school with a degree in Chinese language studies. After that he taught the history of Chinese literature at Waseda University, Toyo University, and other schools.

In 1896, he cofounded the Dongya Xueyuan (東亞學院, East Asia College) with Oyanagi Shigeta and others. Fujita also founded the journal Jiangsu Wenxue (江湖文學; Jiangsu Literature). In 1897 he visited Shanghai. In 1898 he helped create the Dongwen Xueshe (東文學社, East Asian literature society) with Luo Zhenyu. In 1904, Cen Chunxuan, the governor of Guangxi and Guangdong, asked Fujita to help with education. In 1905, he helped create Suzhou High School (江苏师范学堂). He invited more than 10 teachers from Japan. The Qing dynasty then awarded him a medal. In 1909, Fujita became a professor at the prestigious Beijing University.

In 1912, Fujita returned to Japan. He lived in Tokyo and researched the history of east–west interactions. In 1920 he earned a PhD in literature. In 1923 he was a professor at Waseda University. He taught the history of east–west sea transportation and the history of the Western Regions of China, or Xiyu, modern day Xinjiang. In 1925 he became professor at the Imperial Tokyo University and first lecturer on East Asian history. In 1928 he became a professor and Minister of Culture and Politics at Taihoku Imperial University (臺北帝國大學). In May 1929 he returned to Tokyo to give a lecture on the history of Xiyu again. But in July he died of kidney failure.

== Works ==
- 東洋史 文学社, 1896－97
- 先秦文学 支那文学史稿 東華堂, 1897
- 東洋歴史物語 アルス (日本児童文庫), 1929
- 東西交渉史の研究 南海篇 岡書院, 1932
- 東西交渉の研究 巻上・下(南海篇,西域篇及附篇) 萩原星文館, 1943
