= He Qiaoyuan =

- Born: 1558; Fujian, China
- Died: 1632 (aged 73–74)
- Occupation: Official

He Qiaoyuan
- Traditional Chinese: 何喬遠
- Simplified Chinese: 何乔远
Transcriptions
Standard Mandarin
- Hanyu Pinyin: Hé Qiáoyuǎn

He Qiaoyuan (1558–1632) was an official in Fujian during the Ming dynasty, known for arguing in 1630 for the repeal of the 1626 ban on foreign trade, and for being a proponent of the silver trade. As a scholar, he also composed the Fujian Gazetteer, the Mingshan Storehouse, and the Min Shu (in 1619).
