= Tamão =

Tamão 屯門
- Trade settlement
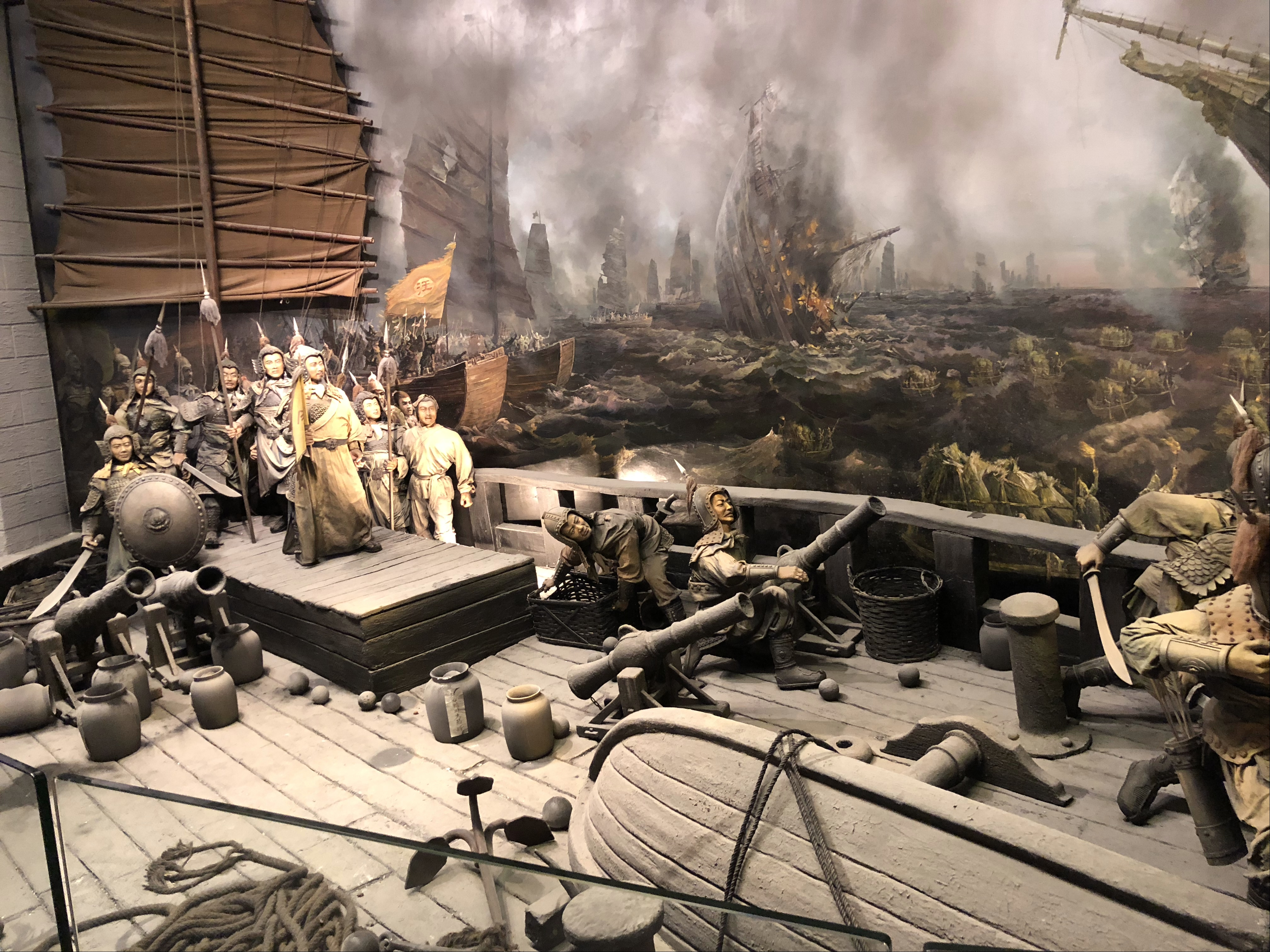
- Imagined scenes of Battle of Tunmen

- Flag Coat of arms

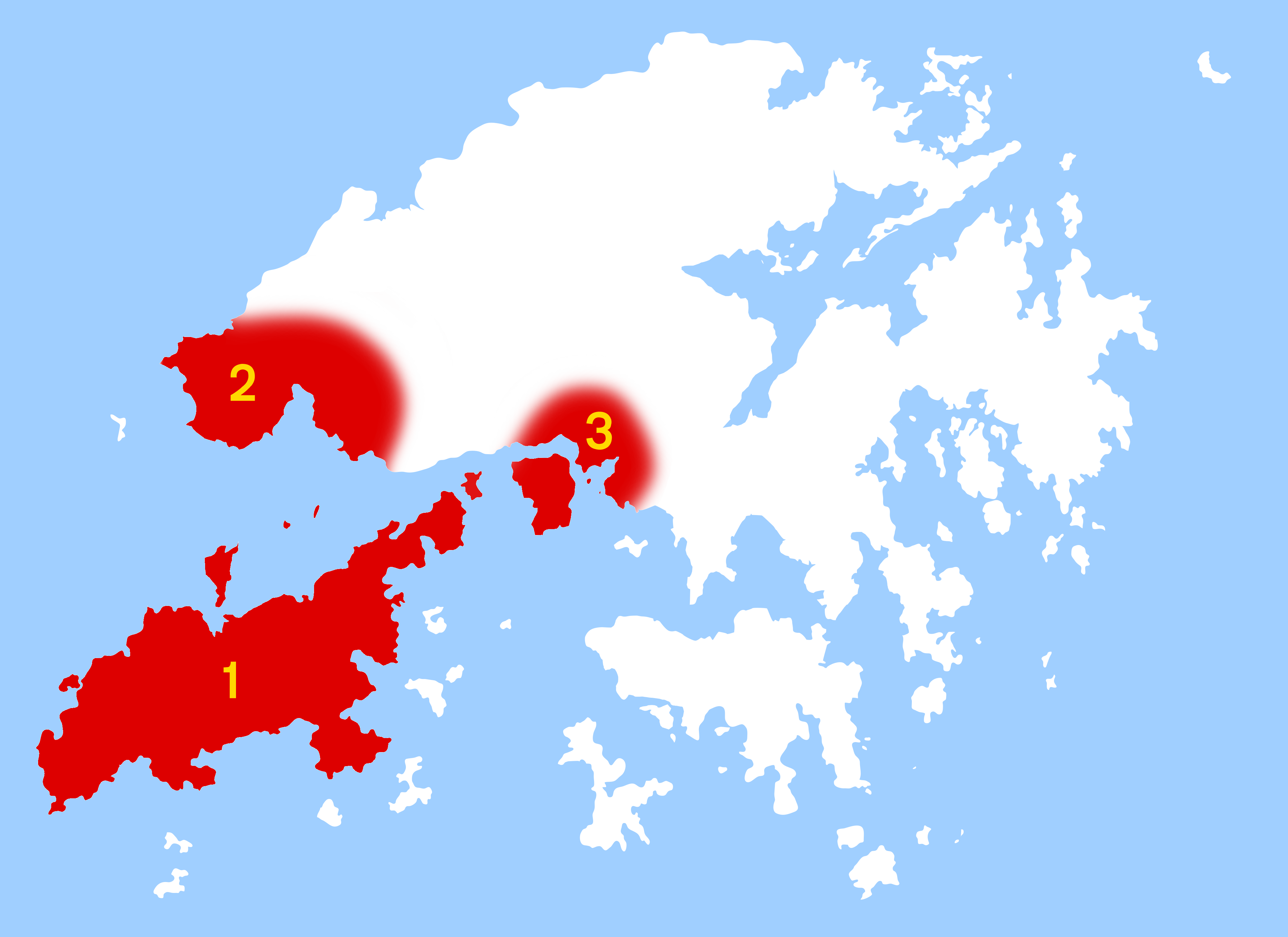
- Possible extent of Portuguese settlement (1518–1521) (Note: Lantau Island (1) is one of the possible locations of "Tamão"; Castle Peak Bay (2) is a possible location of the "Tunmun Inlet"; the settlement is also said to have reached Kwai Chung inlet (3) as well.)
- Country: Portuguese Empire
- Established: 1514
- Battle of Tunmen: 1521
- Founder: Jorge Álvares

Tamão
- Traditional Chinese: 屯門
- Simplified Chinese: 屯门
- Hanyu Pinyin: Tún Mén
- Pha̍k-fa-sṳ: Thûn mùn
- Yale Romanization: Tyùhn mùhn
- Jyutping: Tyun^{4} mun^{4}

Tunmen Inlet
- Traditional Chinese: 屯門澳
- Simplified Chinese: 屯门澳
- Hanyu Pinyin: Tún Mén Ào
- Pha̍k-fa-sṳ: Thûn mùn àu
- Yale Romanization: Tyùhn mùhn ou
- Jyutping: Tyun^{4} mun^{4} ou^{3}

Tamão (Chinese: 屯門) was a trade settlement set up by the Portuguese on an island in the Pearl River Delta, China. This was the first time Europeans reached China via the sea route around the Cape of Good Hope. The settlement lasted from 1514 to 1521, when the Portuguese were expelled by the Ming dynasty navy.

== Location ==
In 1514, the Portuguese explorer Jorge Álvares arrived on the Chinese coast at an island in the Pearl River Delta, which they called "Tamão". Many researchers take the name "Tamão" as a corruption of "Tunmen" (屯門), the name for what is now the western Hong Kong and Shenzhen area. Chinese sources state that the Portuguese settled around the Tunmen Inlet (屯門澳), but the current whereabouts of the Tunmen Inlet is unknown, so the precise location of the Portuguese settlement remains a matter of debate among historians.

Rendered in Chinese, the name is identical to the Tuen Mun district in present-day Hong Kong. This leads some researchers to link the Tunmen of Ming times to Tuen Mun in the New Territories of Hong Kong. "Tunmen Inlet" would then refer to one of two bays around Tuen Mun: Castle Peak Bay, next to the current Tuen Mun New Town; or Deep Bay between the New Territories and Nantou in present-day Shenzhen, where a Ming coastal defense force was stationed.

However, the identification of Tunmen Inlet with modern-day Tuen Mun is confused by original Portuguese sources that clearly state Tamão was an island. As Tuen Mun is not an island, some researchers have proposed that Tamão may actually refer to one of the nearby islands. Nei Lingding Island has been identified by J. M. Braga to be the Tamão of the Portuguese sources, and is, for a time, followed by Western scholarship; however, recent Chinese scholarship has argued that this identification is insufficiently supported by historical evidence, and suggests a number of other potential islands, such as the nearby Chek Lap Kok or the larger Lantau Island. Hong Kong historian Patrick Hase argues that Lantau Island is the only island in the vicinity to have a good harbour, sufficient agricultural lands, and adequate water supply suitable for a foreign occupying force. No archaeological evidence of the occupation was ever found.

== History ==
During the Ming dynasty, private maritime trade by Chinese was prohibited and foreign trade in Chinese ports was officially restricted to highly regulated tribute embassies. Despite these restrictions, Chinese illegal maritime trade continued, and by 1500 it was flourishing. Under the Zhengde Emperor (r. 1505–1521), restrictions on tribute missions were relaxed to the extent that ships from Ming tributary states in Southeast Asia could trade freely. Rather than being forbidden, this trade was officially approved and taxed by the Superintendencies of Maritime Shipping (Shi Bo Si), led by eunuchs who sought to obtain rare goods for the emperor. The Guangdong Superintendancy apparently established a tax-collection station at Tunmen or Macao sometime between 1500 and the first Portuguese encounters. By 1519, it was "the island center for the trade of all foreigners".

The first visit to China by the Portuguese took place in 1514, when the Portuguese explorer Jorge Álvares arrived at Tunmen (Tamão) in the Pearl River Delta. Álvares likely traveled on Malaccan or Chinese ships and returned with profitable cargo. In 1517, Fernão Peres de Andrade arrived in the Pearl River Delta with eight ships and an ambassador from the King of Portugal, Tomé Pires. When Peres de Andrade left in September 1518, he posted a notice at Tunmen that "anyone who had been injured by a Portuguese or to whom a Portuguese owed money should see him for redress", which (according to a Portuguese source) made a very good impression on the Chinese.

The good relations between Portugal and the Ming established by Fernão Peres de Andrade were ruined by his brother, Simão de Andrade at Tunmen in August 1519. Simão built a small fort on Tunmen, ceremoniously executed a Portuguese, interfered with other (likely Southeast Asian) traders, bought Chinese children (possibly kidnapped) from good families, and "knocked the hat off an official who tried to assert Ming authority on the island". Simão's group left in September 1520; reports of their abuses, alongside other factors, led to the rejection of the Pires embassy the day after the death of the Zhengde Emperor on 19 April 1521.

In 1521, the settlement was abandoned after the Battle of Tunmen with the Chinese navy; the Portuguese gathered in Malacca in Malaysia.

According to sources quoted by National Geographic, "Macau may never have existed if not for Tamão" where the Portuguese learned valuable lessons about "how China, the Pearl River Delta, and the South China Sea worked".

== See also ==
- History of Macau
- Shuangyu
- Shangchuan Island
- Lampacau
- Luso-Chinese agreement (1554)

== Bibliography ==
- Hase, Patrick H. (2025). Villages and Market Towns in Hong Kong: Settlement and History. University of Hong Kong Press. ISBN 978-988-237-317-4.
- Tang, Kaijian (1999). Aomen kai bu chu qi shi yan jiu 澳门开埠初期史研究 (in Chinese) (1st ed.). Beijing: Zhonghua shu ju. ISBN 978-7-101-02275-9.
- Twitchett, Dennis; Mote, Frederick W., eds. (1998). "Chapter 7: Relations with Maritime Europeans, 1514–1662". The Cambridge History of China, Volume 8: The Ming Dynasty, 1368–1644, Part 2. Cambridge: Cambridge University Press. ISBN 978-0-521-24333-9.
