= List of I. M. Pei projects =

This is a list of I. M. Pei projects. I. M. Pei (1917–2019) was a Chinese-American architect known for his creative use of modernist architecture in combination with natural elements and open spaces. During his decades of architectural work, he designed some of the world's most recognizable buildings in countries around the world.

== List of I. M. Pei projects ==
Project	City	Country	Designed	Completed	Notes	Image
131 Ponce de Leon Avenue	Atlanta, Georgia	USA		1949	Under demolition/redevelopment as of February 2013	
Roosevelt Field Mall	Garden City, New York	USA	1951	1956		
Mile High Center and redesigning of Denver's Courthouse Square	Denver, Colorado	USA	1956			
William L. Slayton House	Washington, DC	USA		1960		
Erieview Plan	Cleveland, Ohio	USA	1960			
Government Center Master Plan	Boston, Massachusetts	USA	1961			
University Apartments	Chicago, Illinois	USA	1961			
Cathedral Square of Cathedral of Saints Peter and Paul	Providence, Rhode Island	USA	1962	1972		
Kennedy Theatre, University of Hawaii	Honolulu, Hawaii	USA	1962			
Hale Manoa Dormitory, East West Center, University of Hawaii	Honolulu, Hawaii	USA	1962			
Kips Bay Plaza	New York, New York	USA	1963			
Luce Memorial Chapel, Tunghai University	Taichung	Taiwan	1963			
Society Hill Towers	Philadelphia, Pennsylvania	USA	1964			
Green Building, Massachusetts Institute of Technology	Cambridge, Massachusetts	USA	1964			
S.I. Newhouse School of Public Communications, Syracuse University	Syracuse, New York	USA	1964			
Washington Plaza	Pittsburgh, Pennsylvania	USA	1964			
The Century Towers	Los Angeles, California	USA	1965			
University Village, New York University	New York, NY	USA	1966			
Pei Residence Halls and Student Union at New College of Florida	Sarasota, Florida	USA	1967			
Mesa Laboratory	Boulder, Colorado	USA	1967		National Center for Atmospheric Research	
Sculpture Wing of the Des Moines Art Center	Des Moines, Iowa	USA	1968			
Southwest Washington Redevelopment Plan	Washington, D.C.	USA	1968			
State University of New York Campus Master Plan	Fredonia, New York	USA	1968			
Everson Museum of Art	Syracuse, New York	USA	1968			
Cleo Rogers Memorial Library	Columbus, Indiana	USA	1963	1969		
Bedford-Stuyvesant Superblock Plan	Brooklyn, New York	USA	1969			
Dreyfus Chemistry Building, MIT	Cambridge, Massachusetts	USA	1970			
Master Plan, Columbia University	New York, New York	USA	1970			
16 FAA air traffic control towers	in various locations throughout the US, such as O'Hare International Airport, Tampa International Airport, Lambert-St. Louis International Airport, Columbia Metropolitan Airport (South Carolina), and Indianapolis International Airport (since demolished)	USA	1970		Some 50-70 were originally planned for the contract, though only 16 were ultimately built.	
Sundrome (National Airlines Terminal) at JFK Airport	New York City	USA	1970		Demolished in 2011	
Wilmington Tower, now the I. M. Pei Building	Wilmington, Delaware	USA	1971			
Paul Mellon Arts Center at Choate Rosemary Hall	Wallingford, Connecticut.	USA	1972			
Canadian Imperial Bank of Commerce Commerce Court West	Toronto, Ontario	Canada	1973			
Spelman Halls at Princeton University	Princeton, New Jersey	USA	1973			
Herbert F. Johnson Museum of Art, Cornell University	Ithaca, New York	USA	1973			
Augusta Commerce Building, Lamar Building Penthouse, The Ramada, the James Brown Arena, Bicentennial Park, The Revitalization plan of Augusta	Augusta, GA	USA	1974			
Oversea-Chinese Banking Corporation Centre (OCBC)	Downtown Core (Singapore)	Singapore	1976			
Ralph Landau Chemical Engineering Building, MIT	Cambridge, Massachusetts	USA	1976			
Wilson Commons, University of Rochester	Rochester, New York	USA		1976		
National Bank of Commerce Building	Lincoln, Nebraska	USA		1976		
Dallas City Hall	Dallas, Texas	USA	1977			
East Building, National Gallery of Art	Washington, D.C.	USA	1978		project web page	
John F. Kennedy Library	Boston, Massachusetts	USA	1979		A white triangular tower rises beside a black glass building, with circular structures on either side. Pei considers the John F. Kennedy Library "the most important commission" in his life.	
One Dallas Center	Dallas, Texas	USA	1979			
Biltmore Building	Asheville, North Carolina	USA	1978	1980		
West Wing, Museum of Fine Arts	Boston, Massachusetts	USA	1981			
Gem City Building	Dayton, Ohio	USA	1978	1981	Became National City Center, then PNC Bank Building	
Indiana University Art Museum at Indiana University in Bloomington, Indiana.	Bloomington, Indiana	USA	1978	1982		
Sunning Plaza	Hong Kong	China	1982		Under demolition/redevelopment, demolished in 2013.	
Texas Commerce Tower	Houston, Texas	USA	1982		(currently the JPMorgan Chase Tower; (3D/International cooperated with Pei on the design of this building). The nearby drive-in bank was Pei's first drive in bank project)	
Fragrant Hill Hotel	Beijing	China	1982			
16th Street Mall	Denver, Colorado	USA		1982		
Energy Plaza	Dallas, Texas	USA	1983			
Wiesner Building - Center for the Arts and Media Technology, MIT	Cambridge, Massachusetts	USA	1984			
IBM Corporate Headquarters, now MasterCard International Global Headquarters	Purchase, New York	USA	1984			
Fountain Place	Dallas, Texas	USA	1986			
Raffles City	Civic District	Singapore	1986			
Miami Tower (formerly Bank of America Tower)	Miami, Florida	USA	1987			
Bank of China Tower	Hong Kong	China	1989			
Morton H. Meyerson Symphony Center	Dallas, Texas	USA	1989			
Carl C. Icahn Center for Science at Choate Rosemary Hall	Wallingford, Connecticut	USA	1989			
Creative Artists Agency Headquarters	Beverly Hills, California	USA	1989			
The Gateway (Singapore)	Downtown Core	Singapore	1990			
Shinji Shumeikai Bell Tower	Shiga	Japan	1990			
The Towers at Wildwood Plaza	Atlanta, Georgia	USA	1991			
The Kirklin Clinic of the University of Alabama at Birmingham Health System	Birmingham, Alabama	USA	1992			
Four Seasons Hotel New York	New York, New York	USA	1993			
Louvre Pyramid and La Pyramide Inversée, Louvre	Paris	France	1988			
Rock and Roll Hall of Fame	Cleveland, Ohio	USA	1995			
Buck Institute for Research on Aging	Novato, California	USA	1996		The first stage of the Master Plan was completed in 1999	
Miho Museum	Shiga	Japan	1997			
Republic of Korea Permanent Mission to the United Nations	New York, New York	USA	2000			
Essensa Condominium (in association with Pei Partnership Architects and Matrix Design)	Taguig	Philippines	2000			
Bank of China Head Office Building (in association with Pei Partnership Architects)	Beijing	China	1996	1999		
Oare Pavilion	Wiltshire	England	2003			
Zeughaus Wing at Deutsches Historisches Museum (German History Museum)	Berlin	Germany	2003			
MUDAM-Musée d'Art Moderne Grand-Duc Jean	Luxembourg City	Luxembourg	2006			
Suzhou Museum New Wings	Suzhou	China	2006			
Embassy of the People's Republic of China to the United States of America	Washington, D.C.	USA	2006		(in association with Pei Partnership Architects)	
Museum of Islamic Art	Doha	Qatar	2008		The Museum of Islamic Art is reminiscent of the design of the National Assembly Building of Dhaka, Bangladesh by Louis Kahn; Pei has been known to admire this building's design. The Museum is connected to the mainland by three 215-foot-long bridges and the Chamesson limestone is lit from all perspectives.	
Macao Science Center	Macau	China	2009		The Macao Science Center in Macau, designed by Pei Partnership Architects in association with I. M. Pei.	
The Pei Plan for Urban Renewal	Oklahoma City, Oklahoma	USA	1964			

== See also ==
- Pei Cobb Freed & Partners
