= Macau Scientific and Cultural Centre Museum =

Museum in Portugal

Macau Scientific and Cultural Centre Museum (The Macau Museum)
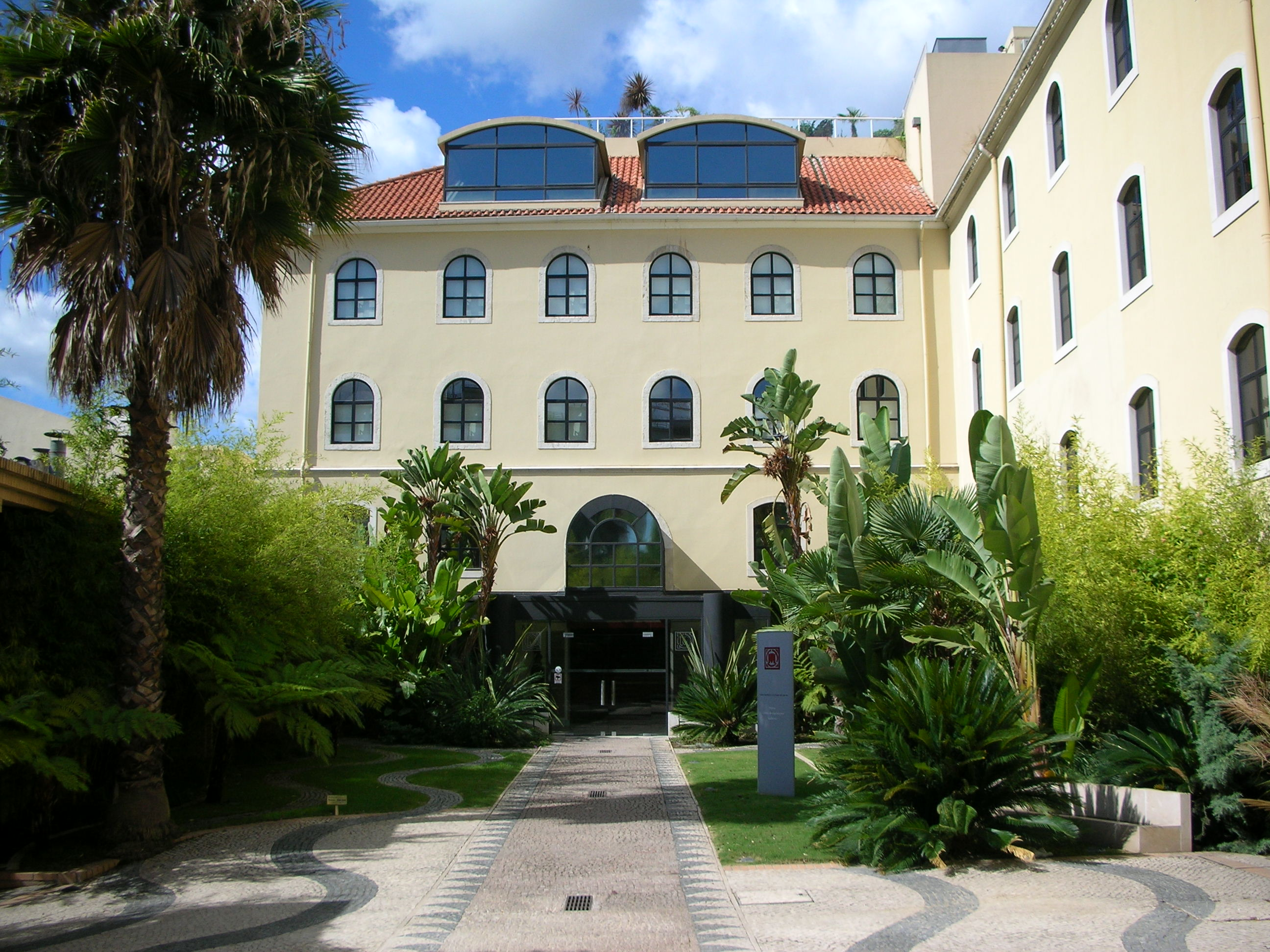

- Location within Lisbon
- Established: April 20, 1995
- Location: Rua da Junqueira 30 Lisbon, Portugal
- Coordinates: 38°42′03″N 9°10′57″W
- Type: Art Museum
- Collections: Chinese art, porcelain, Chinese bronzes
- Collection size: 3,500
- Director: Rui Abreu Dantas
- Presidents: Carmen Amado Mendes, Ph.D
- Website: www.cccm.gov.pt

The Macau Scientific and Cultural Centre Museum (The Macau Museum) in Lisbon is Portugal's main museum of Chinese artefacts and artworks. Made to document Sino-Portuguese relations, the museum contains over 3,500 works of art including decorative artwork, costumes, a collection of opium-smoking paraphernalia and an important extensive collection of Chinese ceramics.

The museum comprises two distinct and complementary sections, a section on the Historical and Cultural Condition of Macau in the 16th and 17th Centuries on the ground floor and a section in its Chinese Art Collection on the first floor.

== Rooms and layout ==
=== Ground floor ===
This floor depicts Ming China and to the intercultural border between Europe and China created with the port city of Macau. The exhibit details the history of Luso-Chinese relations and Macau:

- Portugal and China: The Beginnings of an Encounter illustrates the unique conditions that originated the city of Macau, while accompanying the growing relationships of the Portuguese with Ming China and the circulation of interests and information from the China Sea to the Indian and the Atlantic oceans;
- The Port City shows how the network of interests and relations between groups of Portuguese and Chinese created the need and possibility for a city of services between Europe and Asia, between East Asia, the Indian and the Atlantic oceans;
- The Order of Transfers makes contact with some of the ecological and technological exchanges that make Macau a pole of dynamism in East Asia and Europe. New foods, instruments and measures enter China and Europe through Macau, which has been since its origin one of the central points in the regular openness and communication between East Asia and Europe, between both and the rest of the world;
- Christianity and Culture emphasises the role of Macau as a place of religious plurality with a Chinese syncretism of popular religiosity, Buddhism, Taoism and Confucianism, accompanied by Christianity, with an emphasis on the role of St. Paul's College, the first European university college in China.

=== First floor ===
This floor covers a period of more than 5,000 years of Chinese history and art. The collection consists of terracottas, Chinese bronzes, stoneware, blue and white porcelain, green family porcelain, pink family porcelain, emblazoned and monogrammed porcelain, religious symbolic porcelain, Shek Wan ceramics, opium-smoking paraphernalia, china trade, lacquerware, paintings from Chinese and European schools, fans, silverware, costumes and a collection of numismatics.

== Collections ==
View part of the museum's collection, openly available to download under a CC BY-SA 4.0 licence here.

=== Bronzes ===
Han dynasty urn (“hill-jar”) in the museum's collection

The manufacture of bronze began in the Xia dynasty (c.2200-1765 B.C.), reaching its zenith during the Shang dynasty (c. 1700-1050 B.C.). It was linked to sacrificial religious rituals and ancestor worship. The first bronzes copied the forms of Neolithic ceramics such as three-footed vases, pedestal plates and jugs. The main decorative motif of the ritual vases of the Shang dynasty was the Taotie – a mask of a non-specified animal with eyes, ears, mouth, horns and paws. A Taotie mask features on a Gui vessel from the Zhou period (c. 771–475 BC) in the museum's collection.

Archeological excavations of tombs of later epochs, Zhou of the East, Han and Tang, reveal the existence of various bronze objects (vases for wine and other beverages, food containers, arms and mirrors) necessary for everyday life and the afterlife.

One of the oldest objects in the museum's collection is a bronze Jue ritual vessel from the Shang dynasty (c. 1750 – 1050 BC). This vessel in which wine was served was called Jue because of its form resembling a bird with a broad beak, used to pour the liquid, and a tail. It also has two wings and three feet.

The collection also holds a bronze sculpture of a dragon dating from the Zhou dynasty (475–221 BC). The dragon is a hybrid of various animals having the head of a lion, the wings and claws of a bird and the scales of a fish. This amalgamation is a symbol for China, given that China was initially made up of several regions, each symbolised by an animal.

Han dynasty ceramic dog in the museum's collection

=== Chinese ceramics ===
The museum has the most important collection of Chinese ceramics in Portugal. With objects ranging from neolithic earthenware to 19th century export porcelain, the museum's ceramics collection covers over a period of over 5,000 years of Chinese art history.

==== Earthenware and early ceramIcs ====
The history of Chinese ceramics dates back to the Neolithic period.

Since the third millennium B.C., it underwent considerable development, especially with the manufacture of kitchen utensils, food storage containers, wine goblets and ritual vases. Organic substances, such as crushed shells, herbs and seed shells were added to the raw material (clay) in order to give it a greater consistency.

The museum contains several objects of neolithic earthenware, amongst them a steam cup in fine grain black earthenware, also known as “eggshell”; the stem is decorated with vertical slits and horizontal fillets.

Ming dynasty procession in the museum's collection

==== Terracottas ====
The museum holds an important collection of terracotta ceramics dating from the Han dynasty (202 BC – 220 AD) through to the Ming dynasty (1368 d.C. – 1644 .d.C.).

A highlight from the collection is a Han period sculpture of a horse's head. The sculpture reveals accurate modelling techniques and a great interest in horses. New species were introduced to the stud farms of the Han dynasty emperors, strengthening the breeding stock and increasing the number of horses in use. Horses appear to have been associated with high social status, conferring on their owners a position of privilege in society.

During Tang dynasty (618–906) ceramics attained a place of prominence in daily life, acquiring daring shapes and colours, either white, blue, yellow or brown and also in polychromic combinations of 2, 3 and 4 colour in one piece, known as “sancai”.

From this period the museum houses several funeral earthenware statuettes that accompanied elements of Chinese high society in the afterlife. Their purpose was to ward off evil spirits and represent the status of the deceased in the social hierarchy. These objects portray everyday life and the socio-cultural context of the deceased. They include servants and dignitaries, animals and domestic utensils as well as imaginary figurines whose function was to protect and render the tomb inviolable.

The camel with two-humps was introduced to China from the Xiongnu region and used as a pack animal to cross the Gobi desert and the Tarim Basin. The Uighurs, Tibetans and Turks sent camels to Chang as a tribute. Camels were the beast of burden used along the Silk Route linking Chang (capital of China under the Tang dynasty) and the west. The museum contains two detailed and well executed sculptures of two-humped camels from this period.

==== Stoneware ====
Jin dynasty lion-shaped vessel in the museum's collection

It was at the end of the Zhou dynasty (1027 B.C.-256 B.C.) that stoneware was discovered. It is a resistant, waterproof material, glazed in all its thickness and made of compact particles with shiny fracture.

During the classical period, the Song dynasty (960–1279) witnessed sudden progress in agriculture and metallurgy as well as in the manufacture of silk and ceramics.

The improvement in the standard of living and subsequently of the cultural level were reflected n the ceramic production. Stoneware objects became more refined and whiter. The glaze and colour attained a high level of quality. The Celadon green became famous for its thickness, shine, tonality, texture and craquelure.

An abundance of ceramic ware was made possible by the existence of numerous kilns. The most important were those in Dingzhou, Longquan, Jingzhou, Cizhou and Jizhou.

The museum collection contains various stoneware objects from the Jin (265–316) to the Ming (1368–1644) dynasties. Of particular note is an incense burner covered with green glaze (yue ware) created during the Six Dynasties period. This object was used in temples, included in the offerings to deities, with the aim of warding off evil spirits.

Another item of particular note in the stoneware collection is a lion-shaped vessel, the purpose of which still remains unclear. Some scholars have identified it as a candlestick holder for frightening away demons. Others have interpreted it as an inkwell for scribes.

Qing dynasty ecuelle with cover and saucer in the museum's collection

==== Porcelain ====
Technically, porcelain is a product of an improved stoneware due to the use of a special plastic potter's earth, kaolin and high temperature firing above 1350 °C. These permit a fine, translucent, hard and colourless clay.

Duarte Barbosa's book “Livro das Cousas do Oriente” is the first know recorded description, in the West, on the production of porcelain. However, the complete description was written by another Portuguese Gaspar da Cruz in his “Tratado das Cousas da China”.

Chinese porcelain was first produced in the Tang dynasty (618–906), having as its most important centre Hebei in Xingzhou. Chinese porcelain evolved rapidly during the Ming dynasty (1368–1644), due to the discovery of Kaolin. It reached the height of perfection in the mid-fourteenth century.

The museum has a vast collection of Chinese export porcelain amongst a wider variety of styles.

===== Blue and white porcelain =====
Ming dynasty dish in the museum's collection

From the fourteenth to the seventeenth century, blue and white pottery constituted the bulk of Chinese porcelain production. The golden age of blue and white pottery occurred during the reign of Xuande (1426–1435). They produced bowls, vases, dishes, pilgrim flasks, meiping, aquariums and bottles all vividly decorated with fishes, birds, trees, aquatic plants and landscapes.

Chinese porcelain was regularly exported to Europe during the reign of Jiaqing (1522–1566). The Portuguese had a monopoly on this trade until the seventeenth century, when the Dutch began to control the seas of the East. The porcelain was then exported in great quantities in carracks, making it an accessible commodity to the European middle class.

It was during the reign of Wanli (1573–1620), that the blue and white porcelain for export declined in quality, with its characteristic prominent blue being replaced by a “kraakporselein”, so-called because of the type of ships used for its transport. It was first commercialized by the Portuguese and later by the Dutch. This porcelain, used in decorative panels, was characterized by dark and shiny blues and a fine glaze. The use of moulds was popularized due to growing demand but it led to an impoverished decorative style. Macao and Shantou were the main ports of export. The carraca porcelain was imitated in faience by Portugal, Holland, England, Germany and Persia for the secret of porcelain production was still unknown to them.

Of note in the museum's collection is a plate decorated with a cobalt blue underglaze characteristic of porcelain exported from the port of Shantou in the north of the Guangdong province. The motifs painted on the bottom of the plate were probably inspired by maps: two large ships, each with two masts, sailing on a rough sea, a sea monster, similar to the whales which reproduce in the South China Seas, and a rocky landscape with architectural features. In the center of the plate a compass links up with the rest of the composition through the lines extending out from the cardinal, collateral and intermediate points.

Another object of particular note is a plate in Portuguese faience, decorated with motifs inspired by the porcelain exported from China during the Wanli period. Portuguese potters in the seventeenth century were influenced by exotic designs from the Orient and produced bowls, jars, plates and tiles using decorative elements originating in China. The plate shown represents a style influenced by Kraaksporselein, using the same decorative scheme, a gazelle in a rocky landscape in the centre and the rim divided into panels with floral motifs. The tone of blue used was also influenced by the porcelain imported from China.

===== “Fitzhugh” =====
This was the pattern used in blue and white Chinese pottery in the last quarter of the eighteenth century. It is an elaborate pattern with a central crest surrounded by four motifs: flowers or fruits, pomegranates, “Buddha's hand” lemons and a border of geometric motifs sometimes including butterflies.

It is probable that the name of the pattern is related to the English family Fitzhugh that kept commercial ties with China since the beginning of the eighteenth century.

In the nineteenth century, Fitzhugh porcelain was commercialized in the United States. The main ports were New York, Salem, Boston and Philadelphia.

===== Polychromatic porcelain =====
====== Famille rose ======
Qing dynasty plate in the museum's collection

This decoration is characterized by the use of an opaque enamel which allows for colour variation from pink to purple. It is the pigment, purple of Cassius, that made this type of decoration possible. The pigment was brought to China, in 1685, by Jesuit missionaries. It first appeared in enamels on copper and only in 1700 on porcelain.

Famille rose porcelain reached its peak in the reign of Yongzheng (1723–1735).

The colour was imitated by numerous European porcelain manufacturers, in particular the English and the Germans.

In the museum's collection is a teapot inspired by a drawing by Nicolas Lancret (1690–1743) entitled “Spring.” The drawing was copied and then popularised by the engraver Lamerssin. It became common in the eighteenth century to base the decoration of porcelain articles on the engraving of famous artists.

Another piece of note is an ecuelle with cover and saucer decorated with heroic characters from Chinese history based on the book by Jun Gu Lian published in the reign of the Kangxi Emperor (1662–1722). The figures represented include: on the lid, Li Bai (701–762), the poet of the Tang dynasty, the military hero Yue Fei (1103–1142) and Hua Mulan, the most renowned warrior woman in the mythological history of China.

====== Famille verte ======
The nomenclature famille is derived from a nineteenth century classification established by Albert Jacquemart, a French collector. The classification was based on the distribution of green, yellow, black or pink enamels found in the decoration of Chinese porcelain of the reign of Kangxi (1662–1722).

The defining characteristic of the Famille-verte is the predominant use of green enamel over other colours, such as iron red, blue and yellow. The origins of this type of porcelain, in particular the Wucai, are to be found in the polychromatic Ming porcelain.

19th century armorial vase in the museum's collection

==== Armorial and personal porcelain ====
The oldest armorial porcelain dates back to the first Portuguese orders of blue and white porcelain in the sixteenth century. It was only at the end of the seventeenth century that the regular armorial porcelain began to be produced, displaying European design and decoration that appealed to the European market.

The discovery of tea, coffee and chocolate by the Europeans increased the need for porcelain, for it maintains the temperature of liquids better than faience and silver. The best examples for this type of porcelain are found in dinner, tea and coffee sets, and dressing table ornaments of the royal houses of Europe.

Chinese artisans painted the coat of arms in minute detail. However, due to lack of information or misunderstanding, mistakes often occurred.

The museum contains several important pieces of armorial porcelain. Amongst these of particular importance is a plate dating from 1755 with a coat of arms attributed to José Seabra da Silva (1732–1813), deputy minister of the Marquis de Pombal and inspector of the Companhia do Grão-Pará e Maranhão (company trading with Brazil).

==== Religious subjects in porcelain ====
Along with heraldic decorations appeared decorative pieces with motifs of a religious character in the eighteenth century. These included Christian, Islamic, Buddhist, and Taoist designs, made to order for the European, Islamic (India and the Near East) and Chinese markets respectively.

Christian motifs were based on European illustrations that had begun to circulate in the Far East since the sixteenth century. The crucifixion, based on an illustration by Hieronymus Wierix, was probably the biblical event most represented in the porcelain destined for European markets. In the museum collection is a set of four plates dating c.1745 depicting the birth, baptism, crucifixion and resurrection of Christ based on Wierix's illustrations.

The use of sacred symbols and Koranic verses in plates and cups reveal porcelain as an effective vehicle for the propagation of faith in the Islamic world.

Buddhism and Taoism were the first to realize the advantages of porcelain as an effective means of religious expansion, easily accessible to all social classes. Thus one finds illustrations such as a boy with magical and religious powers and divinities of Buddhist and Taoist pantheons, like the goddesses Guanyin and other patrons of music and the home, Han Xiangzi.

The museum holds a sculpture of He Xiangu from the Qing dynasty period (1976–1820), the patron of housewives. This is the only female figure amongst the Eight Immortals in the Taoist tradition.

==== Erotic porcelain ====
The museum's collection contains erotic porcelain figurines. Some erotic porcelain served a didactic function. They were supposed to be part of the bride's trousseau in order to help her to live naturally with sexuality. The figurines were kept in privacy between clothes far from curious eyes. They were passed on from mother to daughter. Some of these figurines showed a certain restraint by concealing the bandaged feet, the golden lotus, thus avoiding the exposure of the entire body.

Amongst the collection are also plates, vases, clocks or snuff bottles introduced by English and Dutch merchants with depictions of erotic scenes. Contemporary sources reveal that English merchants introduced in Canton clocks with indecent miniatures.

==== Shek Wan ceramics ====
Shek Wan, situated in the region of Foshan between Macau and Canton, was an important centre of ceramic production. It was known for its muddy soil.

The ceramic of this region is of popular taste combining an ornamental and natural form, which highlighted the level of ceramic technique at the baking stage. It left parts of the clay colourless but brightened by glassy pigments. The decorative technique was thus improved accentuating the ivory white and various tonalities of blue, red and green.

The theme of this ceramic is linked to popular imagery with special emphasis on Chinese legends and heroes. Amongst the Shek Wan works in the museum's collection is a statue of Buddha executed by Pun Yu Shu. The work is unique because it was commissioned by Dr. Silva Mendes, the first European collector of Shek Wan ceramics.

Qing dynasty buddha in the museum's collection

=== Religious art ===
One of the most unique items in the museum's collections is a mobile altar from the seventeenth and eighteenth centuries. It is one of only eight of its kind known to be in existence. These items of furniture were made to allow clergymen to celebrate mass on the long sea voyages of the time.

=== China trade ===
The Portuguese had a monopoly on the china trade from the sixteenth century to the middle of the seventeenth century. From 1630 to 1640 they were substituted by the Dutch who continued the trade until the nineteenth century.

Apart from Macau, Canton was the only Chinese port open to international trade after the closure of all ports in 1757 during the reign of the Qianlong Emperor. An area was reserved for foreigners in Canton, located outside the city walls. A series of laws preempted any contact between the Chinese population and Westerners.

Only after the arrival of the English and the French in the eighteenth century can one speak of European influence in Chinese art. Orders from Europe increased to such an extent that the local artisan kilns worked only to satisfy the Western demand.

Not only were sets in demand in the eighteenth and the nineteenth centuries but also paintings, lacquer, fans, silver and furniture of European taste. These products were bound for ports in England, Holland and the United States.

Flourishing trade allowed for the spread of Chinese art in the West, giving rise to chinoiserie.

==== Lacquerwork ====
Lacquer – the sap of a tree (rhus verniciflua) originated in China and Japan – and has been used since Neolithic times in China especially as an impermeable coating for delicate objects in bamboo, wood and silk.

Lacquerwork first found its way to the West along the Silk Route and later through Portuguese merchants trading with China and Japan. European demand in the eighteenth and nineteenth centuries led to the manufacture of all kinds of objects: furniture, boxes, plates and trays, decorated with Chinese and European motifs.

The museum contains a rich collection of lacquered tea caddies. Lacquerwork tea caddies were often presented as gifts from local merchants to traders who frequented Chinese ports in the second half of the nineteenth century.

==== Silverware ====
During the second half of the nineteenth century, there was an enormous increase in the export of silverware from China to the West.

The search for the exotic among the European and American middle class led to the popularizing of silverware. Among the Portuguese silverware present in Macau was the five candle candelabrum with the trademark Filipe de Andrade, Oporto, registered in 1925.

==== Ivory and tortoiseshell ====
Works of sculpture in ivory, tortoise, and jade, ordered by the west, led to a fusion of Chinese expertise and European sculptural models and iconography. Nevertheless, such pieces continued to reveal the art of the artisans as well as their interpretations.

During the Qing dynasty (1644–1911) there were two great schools of ivory work, one in Peking and the other in Canton. The style of the latter was more elaborate.

The cutting of concentric spheres that move within each other was a characteristic of the Cantonese artists for several centuries. One of the most elaborate objects in the museum's collection is the “Ball of Happiness” which probably originated from “The Balls of the Devil's Work”, dated 1388. They were mentioned in the book of Ge Gu Yao Lun of the same year. The number of concentric spheres vary and can be as numerous as twenty. The decoration is geometric and the pattern is never repeated.

=== Dragon robes ===
The Chinese came under Persian, Mongolian and Manchu influences. The models of the eighteenth century attire reflect the combined effect over time of these confluences. The museum houses two pieces of court robes of the late eighteenth century, designated semi-formal or "dragon apparel". These were used by civil officials of high standing during festivities that did not require the use of the court robe.

=== Opium paraphernalia ===
At the beginning of the seventeenth century, the Dutch used opium as a hallucinogenic drug which Asians smoked in a mixture with tobacco. The English were responsible for the drug's expansion. They gave the monopoly of its production and distribution to the East India Company. The conquest of Bengal made this venture possible due to the area being an inexpensive source for quality opium.

Though the use of opium has been known for thousands of years, the drug's administration changed dramatically in the eighteenth century when smoking became the preferred method rather than oral consumption.

This change led to the creation of a series of tools used to extract smoke from opium paste. The museum contains a collection of 62 objects used in the consumption of opium. Of particular interest is an opium lamp stand sculpted in wood and made to mimic bamboo. The museum also contains several rare opium pipes.

The museum also contains a painting by Portuguese painter Fausto Sampaio, known as the painter of the Portuguese colonies, of an opium den in Macau in 1937.

=== Coins ===
The museum holds an important collection of Chinese coins dating from the sixteenth century BC to 1279 AD.

== Library ==
The Library of the Centre is a library specialized in research and teaching on China, Macau, East Asia and European-Asian relations. It is aimed at higher education audiences, students and professors from universities and polytechnic institutes, national and foreign researchers, as well as anyone interested in information and training on China, Macau and East Asia. The library is the most complete and up-to-date library on China in the Lusophone world. With an international and multidisciplinary dimension, it works in collaboration with other libraries and archives, national and foreign, in order to better fulfill its mission of supporting research, teaching, information and dissemination of knowledge. The main areas covered are history, art, culture, science and technology, philosophy, religion and socio-political systems. The library's documentary fund, which includes the most complete documentary collection on Macau and China, in particular Ming and Qing China, consists of documents in Portuguese, English, French, Italian, Chinese and Japanese and is available in an online catalog.

The approximately 27,000 bibliographic records currently in catalog are divided into several collections, among them:

- the collection for consultation and loan, consisting of the most recently published works (from 1960 to the present), integrated by acquisition and donation, and organized in a system of free access for subjects, according to the Library of Congress classification;
- the collection of reserved items, consisting a core of donated documents which are kept in special deposit, namely the documents donated by Monsignor Manuel Teixeira;
- the audiovisual collection, which includes about 40,000 slides and 5,000 photographs, among other physical documents;
- the microfilm collection, a collection consisting of about 7,000 microfilms containing more than 50,000 documents, including the fund from the Holy House of Mercy of Macau, reserved books from the Historical Archive of Macau, the Parish Archives of Macau and the Archive of the Municipal Council of Macau, among other collections. This collection is mainly composed of essential documents on the study of Macau and its institutions, covering a time range from the beginning of the 17th century to the mid-20th century.

== Objects in the museum's collection ==
Longshan culture steamcup

Han dynasty urn (“hill-jar”)

Ming dynasty bowl

Qing dynasty buddha

Ming dynasty kendi

Shang dynasty ritual vessel

Tang dynasty earthenware bowl

Song dynasty head rest

Jin dynasty lion-shaped vessel

Han dynasty bronze tortoise

Han dynasty earthenware dancer

Tang dynasty earthenware bird

Sui dynasty earthenware horse

Tang dynasty earhtenware bactrian camel

Song dynasty cosmetic box

17th century ceramic faience plate

Northern Song dynasty bowl

Ming dynasty "prato covo"

Zhou dynasty dragon

Qing dynasty plate

Qing dynasty, reign of Qianlong ceramic-porcelain Goddess “Guanyin” (“Kuniam”)

Qing dynasty plate “Crucifixion of Christ”

Qing dynasty, reign of Jiaqing ceramic-porcelain plate

Pote Dinastia Ming

== See also ==
- Macau Scientific and Cultural Centre
- Ministry of Science, Technology and Higher Education
- Museum of Macau
- Macau Wine Museum
- Museum of Sacred Art and Crypt
- Macau Museum of Art
- Taipa Houses–Museum
- Archives of Macao
- Macanese people
- Macanese Patois
- Battle of the Tiger's Mouth
- List of portraits in the Gallery of Governors of Macau
