= List of portraits in the Gallery of Governors of Macau =

This is a list of portraits in the Gallery of Governors of Macau, a historic collection of 41 portraits depicting the Portuguese governors of Macau. The portraits were formerly displayed in the Portrait Room on the Palace of Praia Grande in Macau and were delivered to the custody of the Macau Scientific and Cultural Centre in 1999, where they became a part of its collection.

== Background ==
Most of the governors depicted served between 1846 and 1999, a period of around 150 years. The first portrait is that of João Maria Ferreira do Amaral, who served from 1846 to 1849, while the last is of Vasco Joaquim Rocha Vieira, the final governor of Macau under Portuguese administration, who served from 1991 to 1999. The gallery is divided into five sections reflecting different phases of Macau's contemporary history:

- I. The "refoundation" of Macau (1846–1886)
- II. The end of the imperial monarchies (1886–1910)
- III. Between two wars in the World (1914–1946)
- IV. The challenges of the post-war (1947–1974)
- V. The paths of transition (1974–1999)

The portraits below are arranged in chronological order according to each tenure. Governors without an official portrait are omitted from this list. Images are not available for all portraits.

== The "refoundation" of Macau (1846–1886) ==
Portrait	Subject	Tenure	Medium	Artist	Date	Collection	Inv. no.	Ref
	João Maria Ferreira do Amaral	1846–1849	Oil on canvas	Unknown	19th century	Museu de Macau, Lisbon	3308	
	Francisco António Gonçalves Cardoso	1851	Oil on canvas	Unknown	19th century	Museu de Macau, Lisbon	3309	
	Isidoro Francisco Guimarães	1851–1863	Oil on canvas	Unknown	19th century	Museu de Macau, Lisbon	3310	
	José Rodrigues Coelho do Amaral	1863–1866	Oil on canvas	Unknown	19th century	Museu de Macau, Lisbon	3311	
	José Maria da Ponte e Horta	1866–1868	Oil on canvas	Unknown	19th century	Museu de Macau, Lisbon	3312	
	António Sérgio de Sousa	1868–1872	Oil on canvas	Unknown	19th century	Museu de Macau, Lisbon	3313	
	Januário Correia de Almeida	1872–1874	Oil on canvas	Unknown	19th century	Museu de Macau, Lisbon	3314	
	José Maria Lobo de Ávila	1874–1876	Oil on canvas	Unknown	19th century	Museu de Macau, Lisbon	3315	
	Carlos Eugénio Correia da Silva	1876–1879	Oil on canvas	Unknown	19th century	Museu de Macau, Lisbon	3316	
	Joaquim José da Graça	1879–1883	Oil on canvas	Unknown	19th century	Museu de Macau, Lisbon	3317	
	Tomás de Sousa Rosa	1883–1886	Oil on canvas	Unknown	19th century	Museu de Macau, Lisbon	3318	

== The end of the imperial monarchies (1886–1910) ==
Portrait	Subject	Tenure	Medium	Artist	Date	Collection	Inv. no.	Ref
	Firmino José da Costa	1886–1889	Oil on canvas	Unknown	19th century	Museu de Macau, Lisbon	3319	
	Francisco Teixeira da Silva	1889–1890	Oil on canvas	Unknown	19th century	Museu de Macau, Lisbon	3320	
	Custódio Miguel de Borja	1890–1894	Oil on canvas	Unknown	19th century	Museu de Macau, Lisbon	3321	
	José Maria de Sousa Horta e Costa	1894–1897; 1900–1902	Oil on canvas	Unknown	19th–20th century (?)	Museu de Macau, Lisbon	3322	
	Eduardo Augusto Rodrigues Galhardo	1897–1900	Oil on canvas	Unknown	20th century	Museu de Macau, Lisbon	3323	
	Arnaldo de Novais Guedes Rebelo	1902–1903	Oil on canvas	Unknown	20th century	Museu de Macau, Lisbon	3324	
	Martinho Pinto de Queirós Montenegro	1904–1907	Oil on canvas	Unknown	20th century	Museu de Macau, Lisbon	3325	
	Pedro de Azevedo Coutinho	1907–1908	Oil on canvas	Unknown	20th century	Museu de Macau, Lisbon	3326	
	José Augusto Alves Roçadas	1908–1909	Oil on canvas	Unknown	20th century	Museu de Macau, Lisbon	3327	
	Eduardo Augusto Marques	1909–1910	Oil on canvas	Unknown	20th century	Museu de Macau, Lisbon	3328	

== Between two wars in the World (1914–1946) ==
Portrait	Subject	Tenure	Medium	Artist	Date	Collection	Inv. no.	Ref
	José Carlos da Maia	1914–1916	Oil on canvas	Unknown	20th century	Museu de Macau, Lisbon	3329	
	Artur Tamagnini de Sousa Barbosa	1918–1919; 1926–1930; 1937–1940	Oil on canvas	Unknown	20th century	Museu de Macau, Lisbon	3332	
	Henrique Monteiro Correia da Silva	1919–1922	Oil on canvas	Unknown	20th century	Museu de Macau, Lisbon	3330	
	Rodrigo José Rodrigues	1923–1924	Photograph on paper	Unknown	20th century	Museu de Macau, Lisbon	3331	
	Manuel Firmino de Almeida Maia Magalhães	1925–1926	Oil-retouched photograph	Unknown	20th century	Museu de Macau, Lisbon	3333	
	Joaquim Anselmo da Mata Oliveira	1931	Oil on canvas	Unknown	20th century	Museu de Macau, Lisbon	3334	
	António José Bernardes de Miranda	1932–1935	Oil on canvas	Unknown	20th century	Museu de Macau, Lisbon	3335	
	Gabriel Maurício Teixeira	1940–1946	Oil on canvas	Unknown	20th century	Museu de Macau, Lisbon	3336	

== The challenges of the post-war (1947–1974) ==
Portrait	Subject	Tenure	Medium	Artist	Date	Collection	Inv. no.	Ref
	Albano Rodrigues de Oliveira	1947–1951	Oil on canvas	Unknown	20th century	Museu de Macau, Lisbon	3337	
	Joaquim Marques Esparteiro	1951–1956	Photograph on paper	Unknown	20th century	Museu de Macau, Lisbon	3338	
	Pedro Correia de Barros	1957–1958	Oil on canvas	Unknown	20th century	Museu de Macau, Lisbon	3339	
	Jaime Silvério Marques	1959–1962	Oil on canvas	Unknown	20th century	Museu de Macau, Lisbon	3628	
	António Lopes dos Santos	1962–1966	Oil on canvas	Unknown	20th century	Museu de Macau, Lisbon	3630	
	José Manuel de Sousa e Faro Nobre de Carvalho	1966–1974	Oil on canvas	Unknown	20th century	Museu de Macau, Lisbon	3629	

== The paths of transition (1974–1999) ==
Portrait	Subject	Tenure	Medium	Artist	Date	Collection	Inv. no.	Ref
	José Eduardo Martinho Garcia Leandro	1974–1979	Oil on canvas	Unknown	20th century	Museu de Macau, Lisbon	3626	
	José Eduardo Martinho Garcia Leandro	1974–1979	Photograph on paper	Unknown	20th century	Museu de Macau, Lisbon	3343	
	Nuno Viriato Tavares de Melo Egídio	1979–1981	Oil on canvas	Unknown	20th century	Museu de Macau, Lisbon	3627	
	Vasco de Almeida e Costa	1981–1986	Oil on canvas	Unknown	20th century	Museu de Macau, Lisbon	3345	
	Joaquim Pinto Correia	1986–1987	Oil on canvas	Unknown	20th century	Museu de Macau, Lisbon	3631	
	Carlos Montez Melancia	1987–1990	Photograph on paper	Unknown	20th century	Museu de Macau, Lisbon	3347	
	Vasco Joaquim Rocha Vieira	1991–1999	Oil on canvas	Luís Pinto Coelho	1999	Museu de Macau, Lisbon	3624	

== Bibliography ==
- Dias, Alfredo Gomes. Secção I (1846–1886). Galeria dos Governadores de Macau (Report). Lisbon: Macau Scientific and Cultural Centre Museum.
- Dias, Alfredo Gomes. Secção II (1886–1910). Galeria dos Governadores de Macau (Report). Lisbon: Macau Scientific and Cultural Centre Museum.
- Dias, Alfredo Gomes. Secção III (1914–1946). Galeria dos Governadores de Macau (Report). Lisbon: Macau Scientific and Cultural Centre Museum.
- Dias, Alfredo Gomes. Secção IV (1947–1974). Galeria dos Governadores de Macau (Report). Lisbon: Macau Scientific and Cultural Centre Museum.
- Dias, Alfredo Gomes. Secção V (1974–1999). Galeria dos Governadores de Macau (Report). Lisbon: Macau Scientific and Cultural Centre Museum.

== External link ==
- Galeria dos Governadores de Macau
