= CCCM =

CCCM can stand for:

- Corpus Christianorum Continuatio Mediaevalis
- Macau Science and Culture Centre (Centro Científico e Cultural de Macau)
- Certified Commercial Contracts Manager (see National Contract Management Association)
- Climate change counter-movement
