= Dominic Besner =

Canadian artist

- Born: 1965 (age 60–61); North Lancaster, Ontario
- Known for: painter, printmaker
- Website: dominicbesner.com

Dominic Besner (born 1965) or "Besner" is a Canadian artist known for colourful and textured paintings of masked figures. His work was featured at the Canadian pavilion at Expo 2010 in Shanghai, China, and Besner has exhibited throughout Canada, in the United States, Mexico and Morocco.

== Early life ==
Besner was born and raised in the farming community of North Lancaster, Ontario. While studying architecture at Algonquin College in Ottawa, and at the University of Montreal, he developed a passion for drawing. Graduating with a Bachelor of Architecture in 1992, Besner worked at several Montreal architectural firms before turning to art full-time. His first solo exhibit was held at Naomi Gallery (Montreal) in 1995.

== Artistic approach ==
Fascinated by Montreal nightlife, Besner painted street performers and actors. By 1996, white-faced figures painted in rich, textured costumes emerged as his signature subject. Likened to figures by Edvard Munch and Gustav Klimt, these masked characters simultaneously emerge from and fade into the background.

Besner’s unique style has been credited to his architectural training and, in particular, to urban architect Aldo Rossi’s merger of interior and exterior space. Using a mixed-media technique of acrylics, oils, and oil sticks on canvas as well as structural mortar, china marker and aerosol paint on canvas, Besner energizes aristocrats, horses, bulls, or cityscapes with overlapping lines, patterns and planes. Parcours information des Arts editor and writer Robert Bernier notes Besner’s "tremendous capacity to renew contemporary artistic expression while remaining deeply embedded in artistic transition ...".

=== Career ===
In 1995 Besner started exhibiting in Montreal and then throughout Canada and later in the United States, Mexico, Morocco and China.

=== 2000 - 2009 ===
In November 2003, Besner participated in the group exhibition "Voilà Québec en México!" at the University of Guadalajara (Mexico). Invited by Cirque du Soleil in 2004 to exhibit at their headquarters, Besner created 20 large-format (48 x 30) paintings and three scale models for the exposition "La Xe cité révolue". In November 2004, "La démesure des convoités", opened at the CDP Capital Centre (Montreal). Curated by Christian Verronneau, the opening was attended by over 2,000 guests. In 2006, Besner painted the fresco La mécanique des Villes at the Montreal headquarters of the Cirque du Soleil. The making of the mural was also the subject of the 2008 documentary by Pierre Bundock and François Arsenault.

In January 2007, Besner exhibited at the museum, La Villa des Arts, in Casablanca, Morocco. Inspired by the colours and scents of Morocco, he then painted the series "Le Banquet de Nacarat" for an October exhibition at the Venise Cadre gallery (Casablanca), This show inspired Moroccan designers, Karim Tassi, Albert Oiknine and Mohamed Lakhdar, to create caftans based on Besner’s Art. First exhibited in Casablanca and then Rabat, the fashion show developed into a traveling exhibit, "Au fils de l’art". First exhibited in Montreal, in 2008, it opened in Toronto and in Calgary later on.

In 2009, Besner began to exhibit regularly at Galerie V Trimont (Westmount), the first art gallery to permanently designate a room for his work.

=== 2010 - 2017 ===
In May, Besner exhibited two works at the Canadian pavilion during Shanghai World Expo 2010 (China). In September, he participated at the Western China International Art Biennale in Yinchuan, and in a group show at Saatchi Gallery (London) in October. This was followed by the solo exhibition "Hundred words for China" at Can Art gallery (Beijing).

In November 2011, he showed "MORA", an interactive presentation of Besner’s first novella and art. Conceived by former Cirque du Soleil art director, Guy Caron, the event was directed by Danielle de Bellefeuille assisted by College LaSalle students. Over 1,000 guests attended the event at the Côte-des-Neiges Armoury (Montreal).

In June 2012, Dominic Besner exhibited three works painted in Morocco at the First Biennale Internationale Casablanca. In April 2013, Besner’s paintings of the legendary Mortalia, Empress of Gaur, entitled "Immortalis", was presented in November at the Suzhou Museum in China.

== Exhibitions ==
- Nov 2015 Les branches d'Ovane, So Art Gallery, Casablanca (Morocco)
- Nov 2015 Singulière nature humaine, Galerie MX, Montreal (Canada)
- Nov 2013 Humani Ex Machina, Galerie Thompson Landry, Toronto (Canada)
- Apr 2013 Immortalis, Galerie MX, Montreal (Canada)
- Dec 2012 The Light Side of The Moon, Las Olas Fine Arts Gallery, Fort Lauderdale, Florida (USA)
- Sep 2012 Iris Gallery, Baie-Saint-Paul, Quebec (Canada)
- Nov 2011 MORA, Côte des Neiges Armoury, Montreal (Canada)
- Sep 2009 La voyageuse du temps, Galerie Iris, Baie-St-Paul (Canada)
- Oct–Nov 2008 Au Fil de l’Art, Thompson-Landry Gallery Calgary, Alberta (Canada)
- Nov 2007 Au fils de l’art, Galerie MX, Artworks of Besner presented alongside Haute-couture fashion by six Quebec designers in addition to three Moroccan designers, Montreal (Canada)
- Oct 2007 Nacarat banquet, Venise Cadre Gallery, Casablanca (Morocco)
- Nov 2004 La démesure des convoités, Galerie Saint-Dizier at CDP Capital Center, Montreal (Canada)
- Nov 2004 La Xe cité révolue, Galerie Saint-Dizier at the Head office of Cirque du Soleil, Montreal (Canada)
- Mar–Apr 2002 Le cri des lunes, Estampe Plus Gallery, Quebec (Canada)
- Nov 2000 Galerie Saint-Dizier, Montreal (Canada)
- May 2000 Iris Art Gallery, Baie-Saint-Paul (Canada)
- Oct 1998 Coup de théâtre, Estampe Plus Gallery, Quebec (Canada)
- Oct 1995 Naomi Gallery, Montreal (Canada)

== Museum or institutional exhibitions ==
- Apr 2013 Immortalis Suzhou Museum (China)
- Jun 2012 First Biennale Internationale Casablanca (Morocco)
- May 2010 Canadian pavilion, Shanghai World Expo 2010 (China)
- Sep–Dec 2009 Espace création of Loto-Quebec, Montreal (Canada)
- Sep–Nov 2007 Vaudreuil-Soulanges Museum (Canada)
- Jan–Mar 2007 Villa des Arts Museum in Casablanc (Morocco)
- Jan–Mar 2007 ''History of Passion'', Espace Creation of Loto-Québec, Montreal (Canada)
- Mar–Jun 2007 La Villa des Arts de Rabat Museum, Fil de l'Art exhibit, (Morocco)
- Nov 2003-Jan 2004 Musée de Las Artes, Guadalajara University (Mexico)

== Group exhibitions ==
- Dec 2008 Make-A-Wish Fundraising event, Galerie MX Montréal (Canada)
- Dec 2008 12 x 12, Galerie MX, Montréal, (Canada)
- Jun 2007 Soirée Rendez-vous, Galerie MX, Montréal (Canada)
- Mar 2006 Strawberries–Champagne, Las Olas Fine Arts, Fort Lauderdale, Florida (USA)
- Jan 2006 A Night at the Circus, Rosetta Stone Fine Art, Juno Beach, Florida (USA)
- May 2005 “Dix Ans” at Galerie Saint-Dizier, Montréal (Canada)
- 2003-2004 Galerie 479, Ottawa (Canada)
- 2003-2004 Galerie du Dauphin, Honfleur (France)
- Mar 2009 Galerie Estampe Plus, Québec (Canada)
- 2000-2007 Galerie Estampe Plus, Québec (Canada)
- 2000-2003 Teodora Art Gallery, Toronto (Canada)
- Nov 2002 Les Impatients, Centre d’expression et d’interprétation, Montréal (Canada)
- Nov 2002 Galerie Saint-Dizier, Montréal (Canada)
- 1999 Artrageous Gallery, New York (USA)
- 1999 Galerie Drabinsky, Toronto (Canada)
- 1997 Galerie d’art du Petit Champlain, Québec (Canada)
- 1996 Galerie Le Portal, Québec (Canada);
- 1996 Louise Smith Gallery, Toronto (Canada)
- 1995 Galerie Leclerc-Churchill, Montréal (Canada)
- 1995 Galerie Saint-Dizier, Montréal (Canada)
