= Martinsell Hill =

Hill in Wiltshire, England

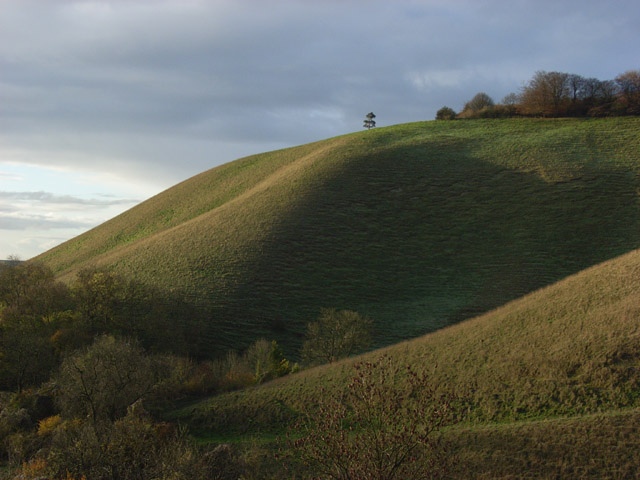
- View across the combe to the east of Martinsell Hill

Highest point
- Elevation: 289 m (948 ft)
- Prominence: 76 m (249 ft)
- Parent peak: Walbury Hill
- Listing: Tump
- Coordinates: 51°22′24″N 1°44′40″W

Geography
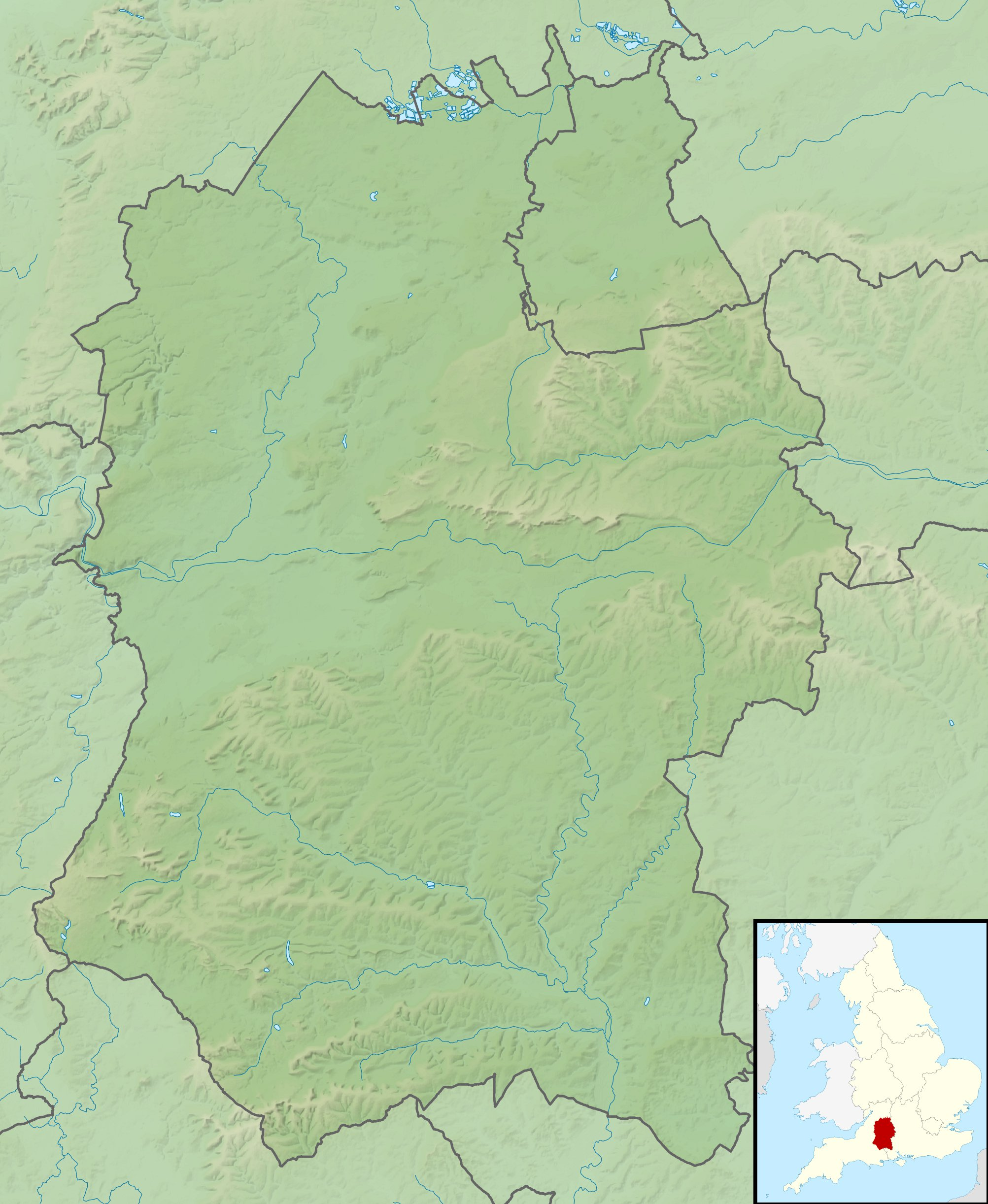
- Location within Wiltshire
- Location: Wiltshire, England
- Parent range: North Wessex Downs
- OS grid: SU178638
- Topo map: OS Landranger 173

Martinsell Hill, near Oare and north of Pewsey, is the third highest point in the county of Wiltshire, southwest England, at some 289 m / 948 ft above sea level. It is the site of an Iron Age hillfort.

== Location ==
Martinsell Hill rises about 2 km east-northeast of the village of Oare, 2 km northwest of the village of Wootton Rivers, and about 4 km north-northeast of the town of Pewsey. The hill is part of an east–west ridge on the northern flanks of the Vale of Pewsey, and overlooks the Salisbury Avon and the Kennet & Avon Canal. The Mid Wilts Way runs along the back of the ridge. There is a trig point at the top. To the west are Oare Hill and the grounds of Rainscombe House.

There are good views from the top, including Salisbury Cathedral, over 40 km (25 mi) away.

== Fort ==
At the summit is an Iron Age univallate hillfort of 32 acres (13 ha) with a clearly visible bank and ditch system. The entrance appears to be to the northeast where there is also a ditch. The fort is the second highest prehistoric camp in Wiltshire.

The hillfort is a scheduled ancient monument and was partially excavated by Colt Hoare.
