= Oare, Wiltshire =

Village in Wiltshire, England

Oare
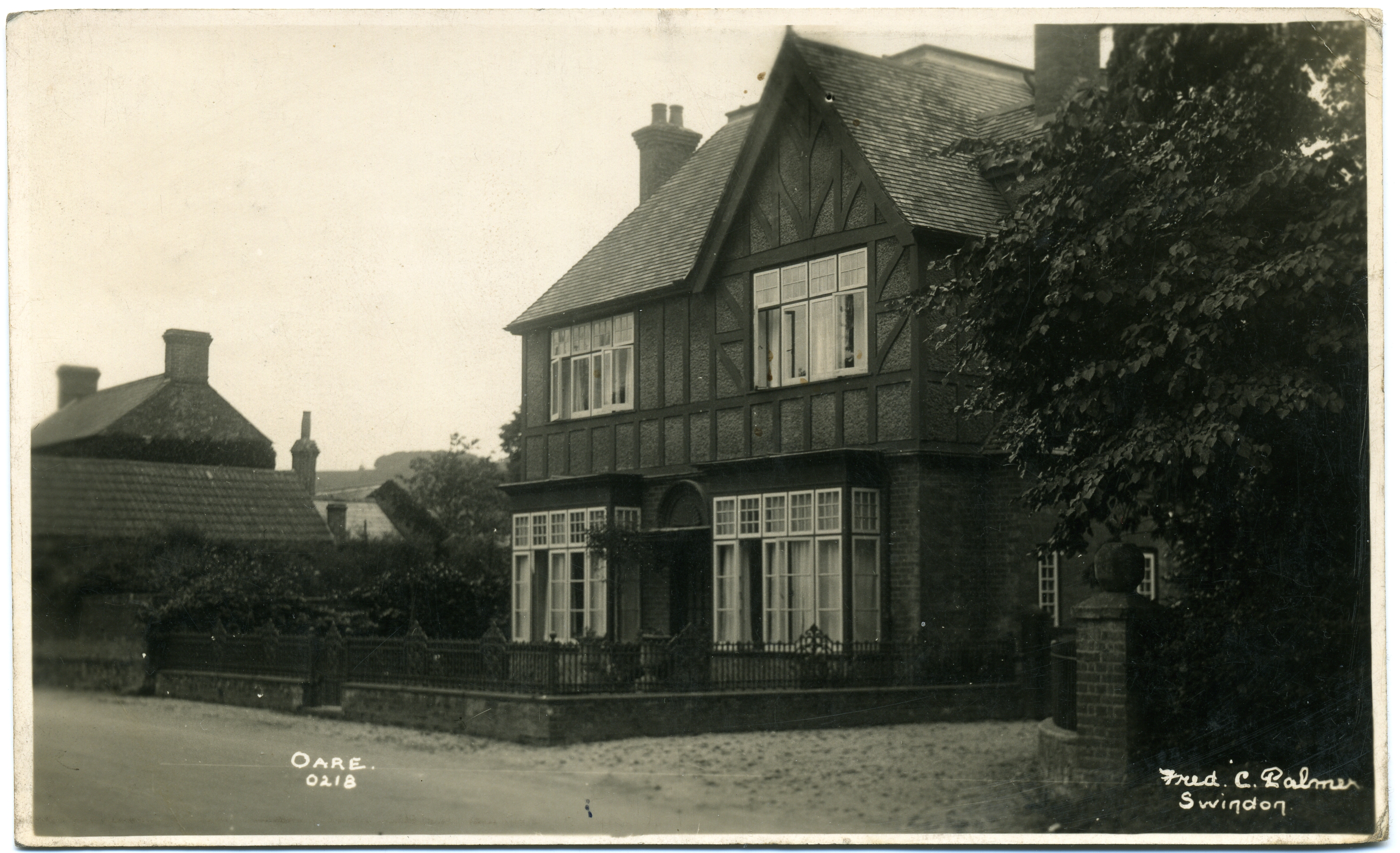
- Oare in 1932, by Fred C. Palmer

- Location within Wiltshire
- OS grid reference: SU158629
- Civil parish: Wilcot, Huish and Oare
- Unitary authority: Wiltshire
- Ceremonial county: Wiltshire
- Region: South West
- Country: England
- Sovereign state: United Kingdom
- Post town: Marlborough
- Postcode district: SN8
- Dialling code: 01672
- Police: Wiltshire
- Fire: Dorset and Wiltshire
- Ambulance: South Western
- UK Parliament: East Wiltshire
- Website: www.oare-wilts.co.uk

Oare is a small village in the east of the county of Wiltshire, England. The village lies about 2 miles (3.2 km) north of Pewsey, on the A345 road towards Marlborough, and falls within the civil parish of Wilcot, Huish and Oare.

== History ==
Oare was anciently a tithing of Wilcot parish. With effect from May 2021, the parishes of Wilcot and Huish were merged to form the parish of Wilcot, Huish and Oare.

== Geography ==
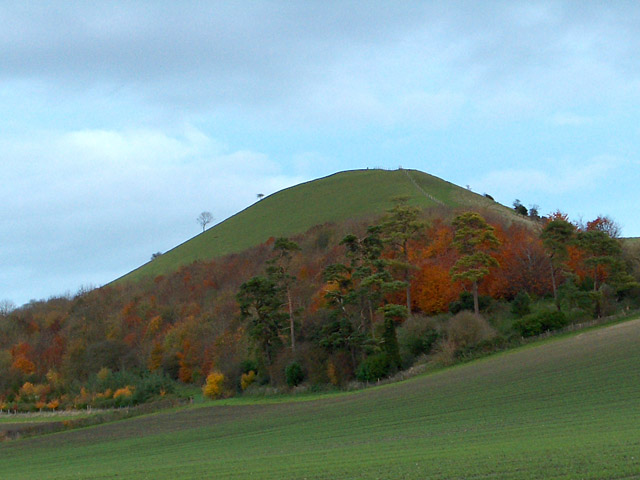
The Giant's Grave, aka the Devil's Grave

The area is popular with walkers and the Mid Wilts Way long-distance footpath passes through the village. The Giant's Grave, a prominent Iron Age fort structure that resembles a neolithic long barrow, at the eastern edge of the village offers views over the village and Vale of Pewsey.

A heart-shaped tree plantation (coordinates: 51.3768°N 1.7881°W) was created in 1999, below Huish Hill in the southeast of Huish parish, near Oare. The heart is a geoglyph, but not a hill figure like the many surrounding "white horses" such as Marlborough White Horse.

== Church ==
The Goodman family inherited the Oare House estate in 1796 and held it until it was broken up in 1893. In 1857–8 Mrs M Goodman, widow of Reverend Maurice Hillier Goodman who had been vicar of Wilcot, paid for the construction of the Church of the Holy Trinity on a site west of Oare House, as a chapel of ease for Wilcot. She engaged the prolific architect S. S. Teulon, who designed an apsed church in Romanesque style, mostly in red brick with some mildly contrasting colours. The nave and chancel are under one tiled roof, and there is a south porch and west bellcote.

An ecclesiastical parish was created for the church in 1892, formed from part of Wilcot parish together with areas which had been detached parts of Alton Priors chapelry (in Overton parish), Huish and North Newnton.

In 1924 the benefices of Huish and Oare were united, with the parsonage house to be at Huish. Wilcot was added in 1962. In 1972 the parishes of Huish and Oare were united and a team ministry was established for the local area. Today the church is part of the Vale of Pewsey Churches, a group of 16 churches.

== Buildings ==
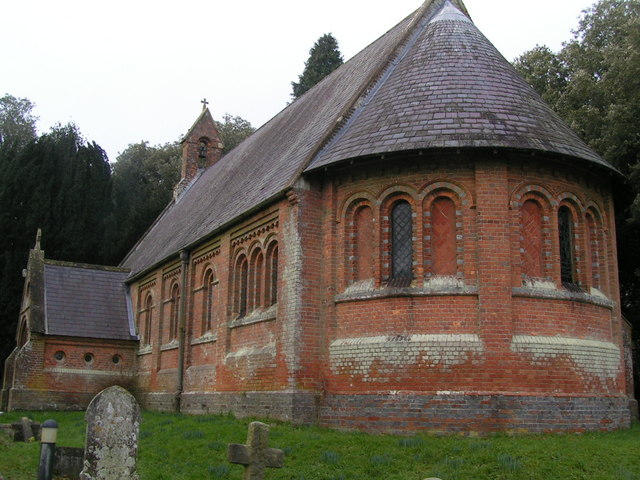
Holy Trinity church

Oare House, built in 1740 on the western edge of the village, is Grade I listed. It was largely remodelled in the early 1920s by Portmeirion architect Clough Williams-Ellis. Its gardens, which include a summerhouse also designed by Williams-Ellis, are listed Grade II on the Register of Historic Parks and Gardens. To the west of the gardens stands the Oare Pavilion, completed in 2003 and the only British building designed by I. M. Pei.

Martinsell Cottages is a row of six two-storey cottages built by the Fry family for their estate employees in 1921, to designs by Clough Williams-Ellis and his associate Frederick MacManus.

At the northern edge of the village is Rainscombe House, built circa 1810 . Its grounds, in the valley between Oare Hill and Martinsell Hill, are the venue for the annual Wiltshire Steam and Vintage Rally, held in June or July.

Oare Church of England Primary School was built in 1914 in the north of the village, replacing an 1850s building near the church. Pupils came from a wider area after 1969 when falling pupil numbers led to the closure of Wilcot school. The school at Oare was remodelled and extended in 2003.
