= John Berwick (politician) =

English politician

John Berwick (by 1508 – 1572) was an English politician who was a Member (MP) of the Parliament of England for Great Bedwyn in 1529 and Marlborough in 1539.

He was probably born into the entourage of the Seymours, and by 1535 was receiver-general for Edward Seymour (later Duke of Somerset). He leased Bulford manor from 1538, and bought other land in Wiltshire at Winterbourne Earls, Clyffe Pypard, Preshute and Hippenscombe; also the lordship of Blandford St Mary in Dorset. In 1549 he bought the Wilcot estate of the former Bradenstoke Priory, and made his home there.

Berwick died in October 1572, soon after making his will. There is a monument to him, dated 1574, in Holy Cross church at Wilcot.

He married one Dorothy and they had one son and two daughters. Their daughter Anne married Sir Thomas Wroughton who was elected on one occasion for Heytesbury.
