= Oare Pavilion =

- Location within Wiltshire
- Alternative names: Oare Tea House Pavilion

General information
- Type: Summer house
- Coordinates: 51.3671°N 1.7863°W
- Opened: 2003
- Owner: Henry Keswick

Design and construction
- Developer: I. M. Pei

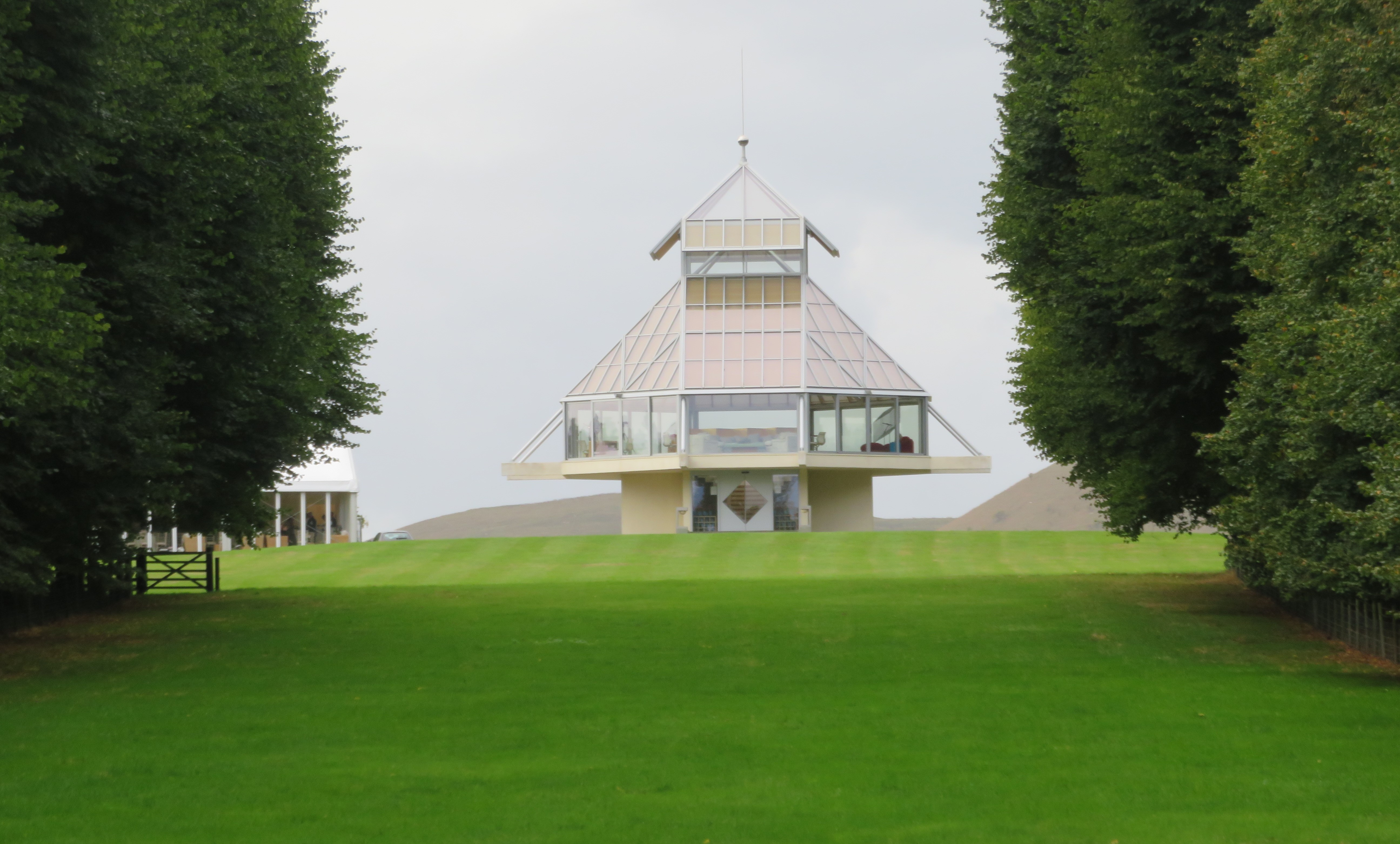
Millennium Pavilion, Oare Park.

The Oare Pavilion or Oare Tea House Pavilion is a summer house designed by I. M. Pei for the businessman Henry Keswick and his wife Tessa Keswick at Oare House in Oare, Wiltshire. It was completed in 2003 and is Pei's only building in the United Kingdom. The pavilion was the recipient of an award from the Georgian Society for a new building in a Georgian context.

Pei was designing the Suzhou Museum in China at the time of his commission by the Keswicks for the Oare Pavilion. Keswick's ancestors had also been acquainted with Pei's father, a banker. The Keswicks wished for an "airy garden pavilion for family activities and guests" that would provide a focal point in the landscape surrounding Oare House.

Pei subsequently received the RIBA Gold Medal from the Royal Institute of British Architects in 2010. In a 2010 profile of Pei written by Paula Deitz for the Architects' Journal, described the Oare Pavilion in the context of its surrounding landscape as "In lieu of an 18th-century folly, the Oare Pavilion is updated 21st-century chinoiserie, a raised octagonal glass structure with a two-tiered, pagoda-style roof on a white concrete foundation...". Deitz sees the pavilion as a "sister to the performance pavilion in the lotus pond at the Suzhou Museum. And, like the museum, light filters through thin wooden slats on the interior of the slanted glass walls" and concludes that the Oare Pavilion is "...one of his best – a fulfilment of a lifetime aesthetic".

The pavilion featured in the 2008 book Follies of Europe: Architectural Extravaganzas where it was described as possessing "proud confidence and advanced technical capabilities". It is visible from the North Wessex Downs. It is also described by Julian Orbach is his revised Wiltshire in the Pevsner Buildings of England series, published in 2021. Orbach describes the "extraordinary" structure as a "pagoda in glass", and notes its "elegant geometry".

Photographs of the pavilion by Morley von Sternberg are in the collection of the British Architectural Library. Von Sternberg described the pavilion as "...geometrically formal, but is in fact an incredibly relaxing place to be" in a 2014 interview.

The cloakrooms, kitchen, and furniture in the pavilion was designed by John Stefanidis.
