= Manuel Teixeira (linguist) =

Manuel Teixeira (April 15, 1912 – September 15, 2003) was a diocesan priest of the Diocese of Macao, a historian and the leading expert in the Kristang language. He authored A Grammar of Kristang, published in the 1950s. He lived most of his life in Macau, where he arrived in 1924 to begin studies for the priesthood, returning to Portugal in 2001.
