= Macao Science Center =

Science center in Macau, China

- 澳門科學館; Centro de Ciência de Macau
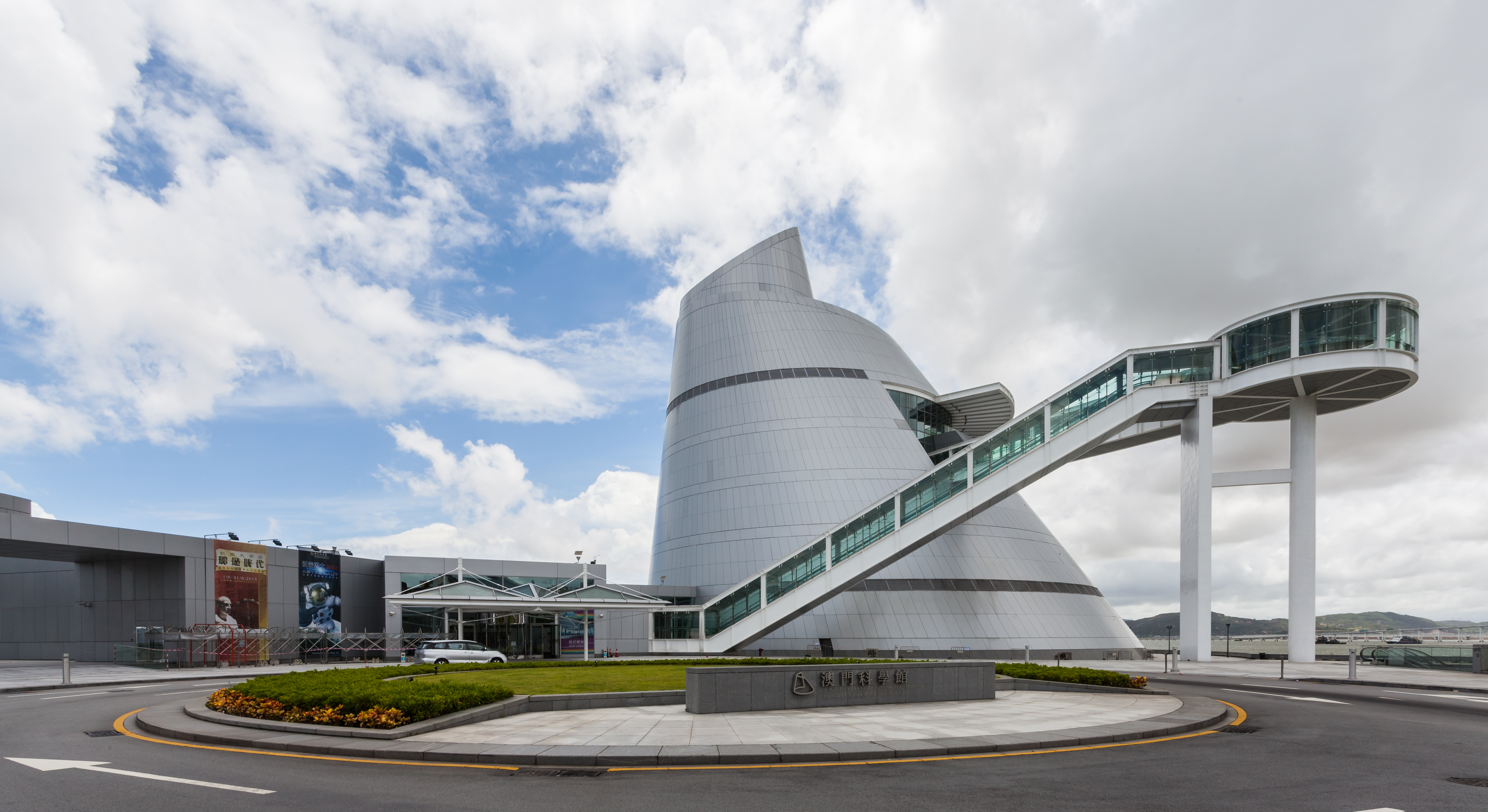
- Established: 2009
- Location: Avenida Dr. Sun Yat-Sen, Sé, Macau
- Coordinates: 22.18610°N 113.55677°E
- Type: Science Centre
- Accreditation: Asia Pacific Network of Science & Technology Centres (ASPAC)
- Collection size: 23,000-sq. meter
- Visitors: 42,066 (2021)
- President: Kong Chi Meng (on behalf of the Macao Special Administrative Region)
- Curator: Sio Hon Pan
- Architect: Pei Partnership Architects
- Website: MSC

The Macao Science Center also known as Macau Science Center (MSC; Chinese: 澳門科學館; Portuguese: Centro de Ciência de Macau) is a science center in Sé, Macau, China.

The main building has a distinctive, asymmetrical, conical shape with a spiral walkway and a large atrium inside. Galleries lead off the walkway, mainly consisting of interactive exhibits aimed at science education.

There is also a planetarium with 3D projection facilities and Omnimax films.

The building is in a prominent position by the sea and is now a landmark of Macau. It is visible when arriving on the ferry from Hong Kong.

== History ==
The project to build the science center was conceived in 2001 and completed in 2009. The building was designed by Pei Partnership Architects in association with I. M. Pei and construction started in 2006. The structural engineer was Leslie E. Robertson Associates. The center was opened in December 2009 by Chinese President and General Secretary of the Communist Party Hu Jintao.

The center caught on fire on 20 November 2015, due to welding occurring on the top level of the building.

== Gallery ==
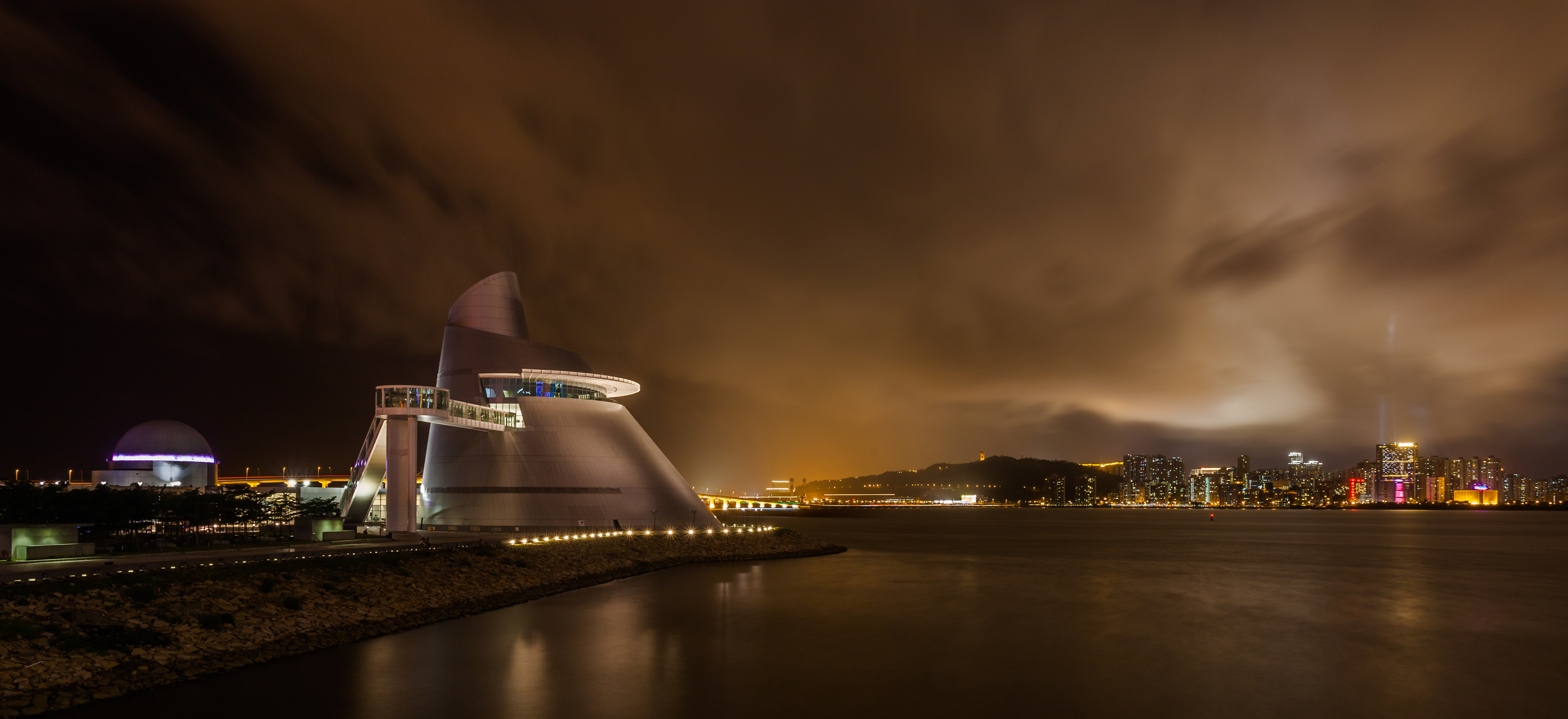
Night view

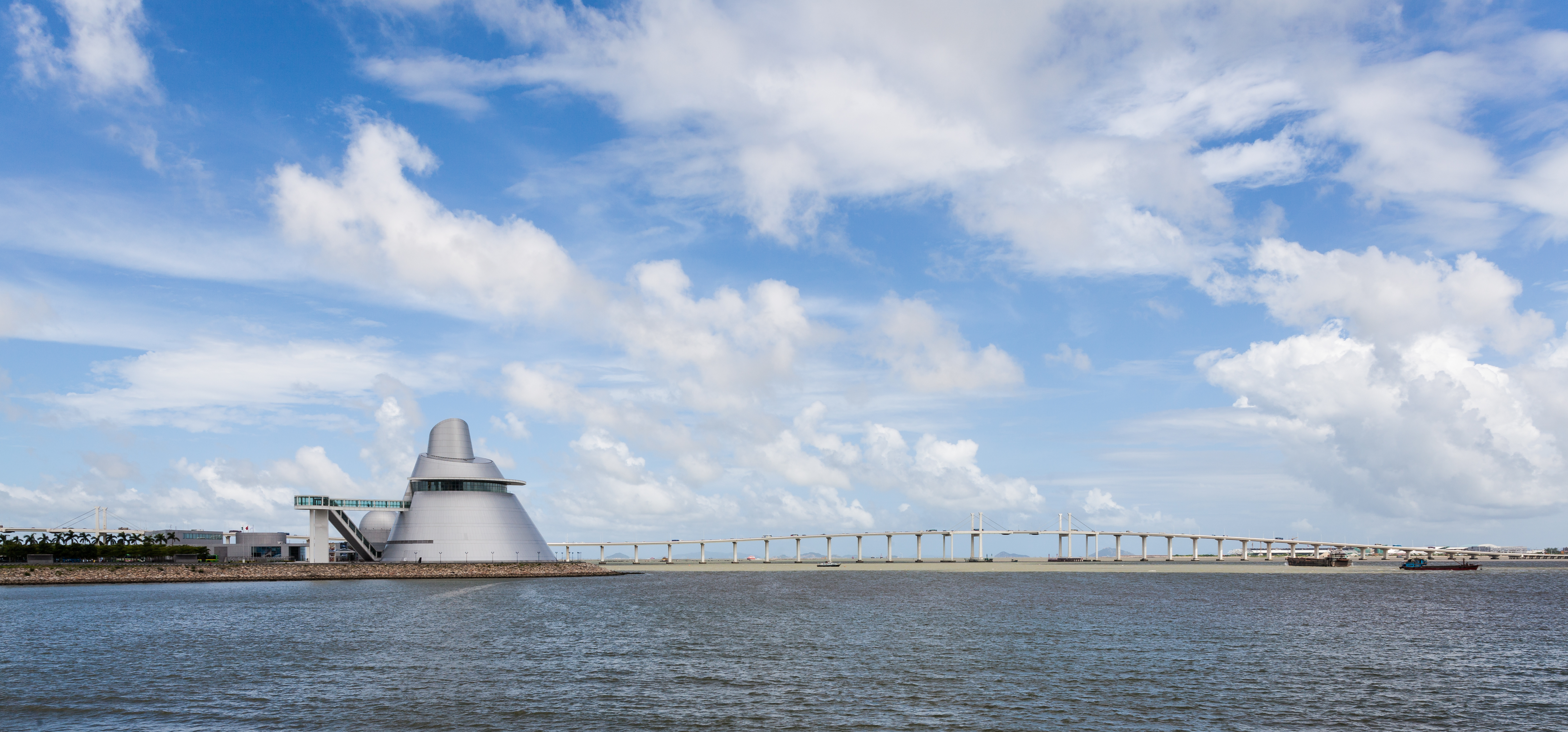
Far view with the Friendship bridge in the background

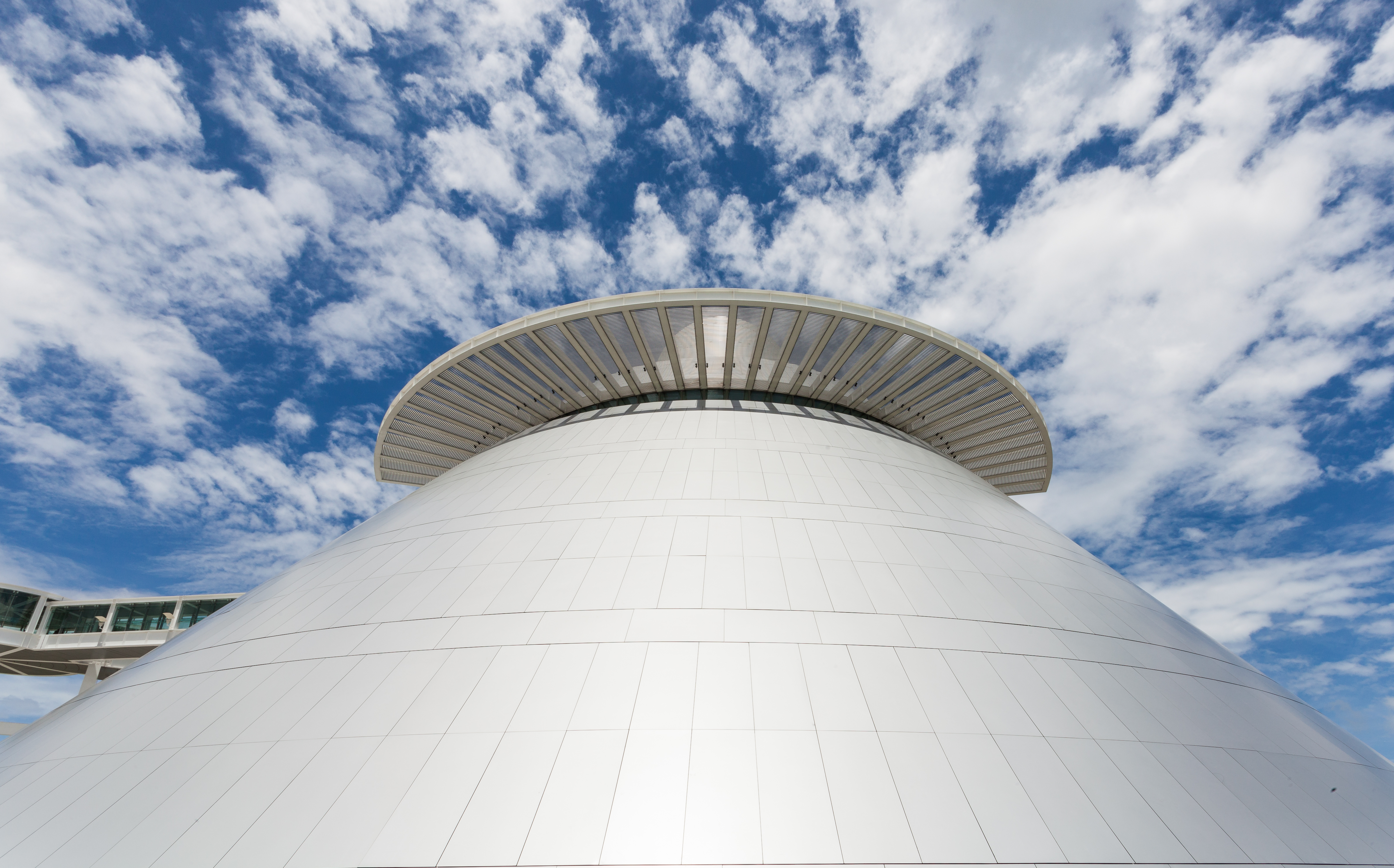
Detail view of the main building

== See also ==
- Macau Science and Culture Centre, Lisbon, Portugal
- List of museums in Macau
