= PEI Architects =

New York-based architecture firm

PEI Architects LLP
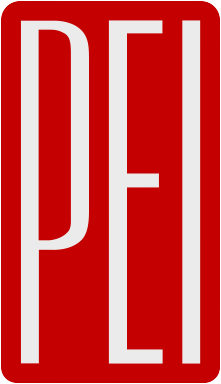
- Company type: Limited liability partnership
- Industry: Architecture
- Founded: 1992
- Headquarters: 257 Park Ave South, New York City, U.S.
- Area served: International
- Key people: Li Chung Pei, Chien Chung Pei
- Services: Architecture; Interior Design; Sustainable Design; Urban Design & Planning
- Owner: Chien Chung Pei; Li Chung Pei
- Number of employees: 30 persons
- Website: pei-architects.com

PEI Architects, formerly Pei Partnership Architects, is an international architecture firm based in New York City. Co-founded by the sons of I. M. Pei, Chien Chung (Didi) Pei and Li Chung (Sandi) Pei, in 1992, PEI Architects has focused on projects like museums, healthcare facilities, commercial buildings, and high-rise residential towers, as well as urban plans and waterfront parks.

The firm is active in North America, Asia, Europe, Africa, and the Middle East. Major projects have included the Chinese Embassy in Washington, D.C., the Bank of China Head Office in Beijing, the Suzhou Museum, and the Centurion luxury condominium in New York City.

== Background ==
Didi and Sandi Pei founded Pei Partnership Architects (PPA) in 1992, after working for their father's firm. (Note: As of November 2022, the PEI Architects website gives its founding year as 1990, but all secondary sources to date have given the year as 1992.) Both brothers earned master's degrees in architecture from the Harvard University Graduate School of Design, and gained experience in large-scale building design projects at I. M. Pei & Partners, which became Pei Cobb Freed & Partners after their father retired in 1990. I. M. Pei worked as a consultant for his sons' business into his nineties, before his death in 2019 at age 102. (Note: As of 1993, I. M. Pei was spending three days a week at the offices of Pei Partnership Architects, and the other two days "holding court" at Pei Cobb Freed & Partners, according to The Washington Post.)

In 2010, World Policy Journal stated that "Didi and his brother are placing their stamp on many of China's greatest cities – from Macau and Hong Kong to Shanghai, Shenzhen and Beijing." According to I. M. Pei, Pei Partnership Architects "came of age" with the Bank of China (BOC) Beijing headquarters project. The PPA's Bank of China Head Office project was the most recent milestone in the Pei family's long association with the BOC, starting with grandfather Tsuyee Pei, who served as a director of the bank, and I. M. Pei, who designed the Bank of China Tower in Hong Kong.

The firm's philosophy is to understand the local context for each project, which has led to design choices such as using white cantera, a local limestone, for the exterior of the Guanajuato State Library in León, Mexico.

== Notable projects ==
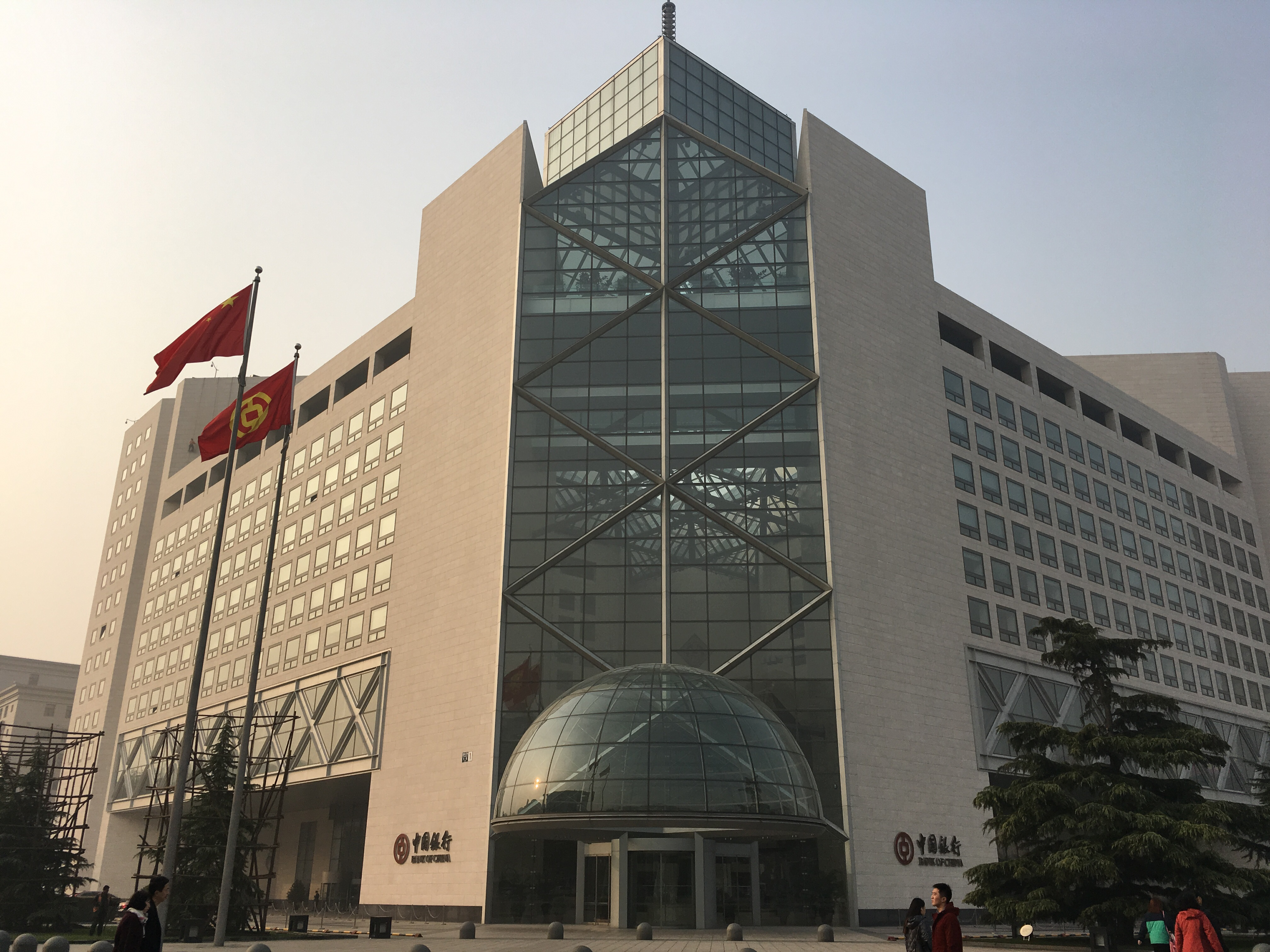
Bank of China head office building, Beijing

The firm collaborated on designing the new chancery building for the Embassy of the People's Republic of China in Washington, D.C. According to C. C. Pei, the firm received about $4 million for its work in overseeing the design of the Chinese Embassy. Other major collaborative projects, also involving their father, included the design of the Bank of China Head Office building in Beijing; the Macau Science Center; and the Suzhou Museum. In designing the Suzhou Museum, both Chien Chung and Li Chung Pei were closely involved with their father in selecting every rock and tree used in the gardens. While I. M. Pei designed the Museum of Islamic Art in Doha, Qatar, Pei Partnership Architects worked with Qatar Museums Authority (QMA) landscape architects on the adjacent 70-acre (28 ha) Museum of Islamic Art Park.

Projects led by Didi Pei for Pei Partnership Architects have included the Ronald Reagan UCLA Medical Center, which was done in collaboration with Perkins&Will. He also led the design of the United States National Slavery Museum in Fredericksburg, Virginia, after the firm was appointed by the former governor of Virginia, Douglas Wilder; as of December 2022 the museum remains unbuilt. Since founding PPA, Sandi Pei led projects including the Industrial and Commercial Bank of China headquarters in Beijing, and The Centurion, the firm's first ground-up building in New York City.

PEI Architects has also undertaken large-scale urban development projects in the U.S., Mexico, China, Indonesia, and Singapore. In 2009, Pei Partnership Architects received the AIA/ALA Library Building Award for its design of the Guanajuato State Library in Léon, Mexico, the first of several new cultural buildings that were part of the Centro Cultural Guanajuato masterplan prepared by the firm.

Unique eco-conscious projects undertaken by Pei Partnership Architects have included the Beijing Xingdebao BMW 5S dealership, designed to consume 30 percent less energy than other buildings of its size, using gardens with wind turbines, solar and photovoltaic panels, and geothermal energy systems.

== List of selected projects ==
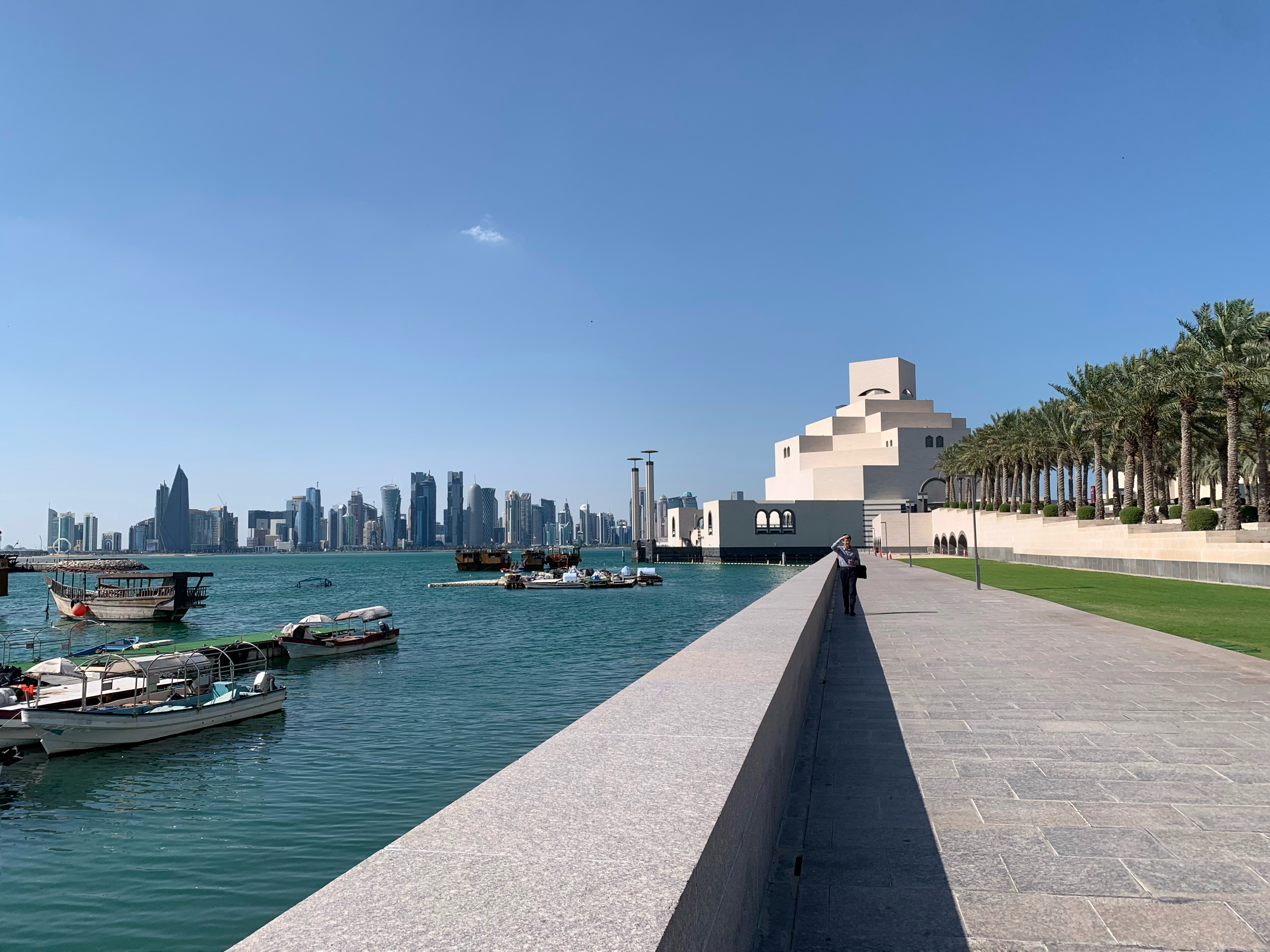
Museum of Islamic Art Park along the Doha Bay

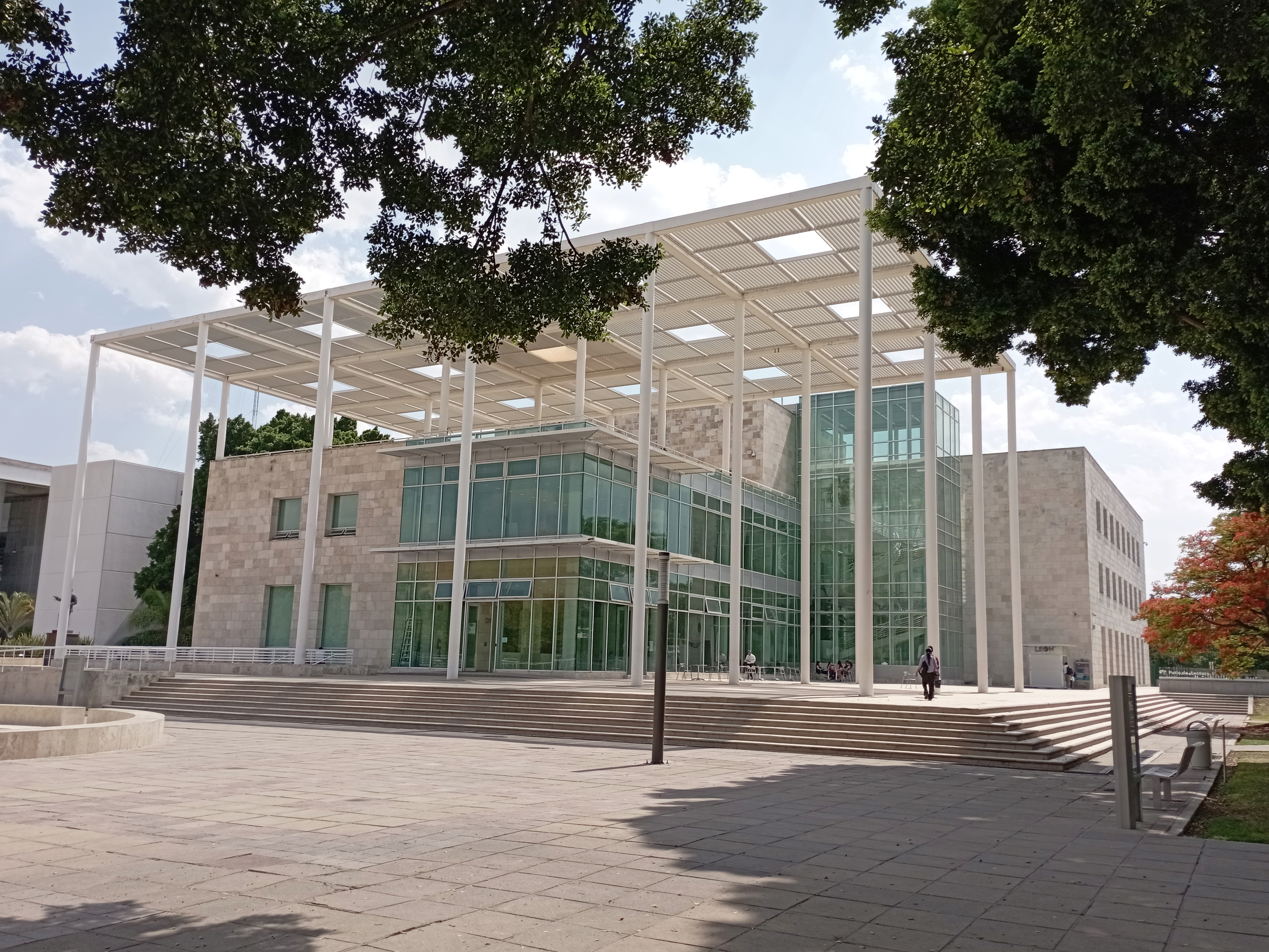
Wigberto Jiménez Moreno State Central Library, León, Guanajuato

=== Commercial ===
- Alturki Business Park, Dhahran, Saudi Arabia
- Amgen Headquarters, Thousand Oaks, California
- Bank of China Head Office, Beijing
- Bank of China Heritage Building, Hong Kong
- Beijing Xingdebao BMW 5S Dealership
- Chateau Lynch-Bages Winery, Pauillac, Bordeaux, France
- Faria Lima B32, São Paulo, Brazil
- Industrial and Commercial Bank of China Headquarters, Beijing
- Q1 Fortune Tower, Qingdao, China
- Shanghai Commercial Bank headquarters, Hong Kong
- Zhengzhou Commodity Exchange, China

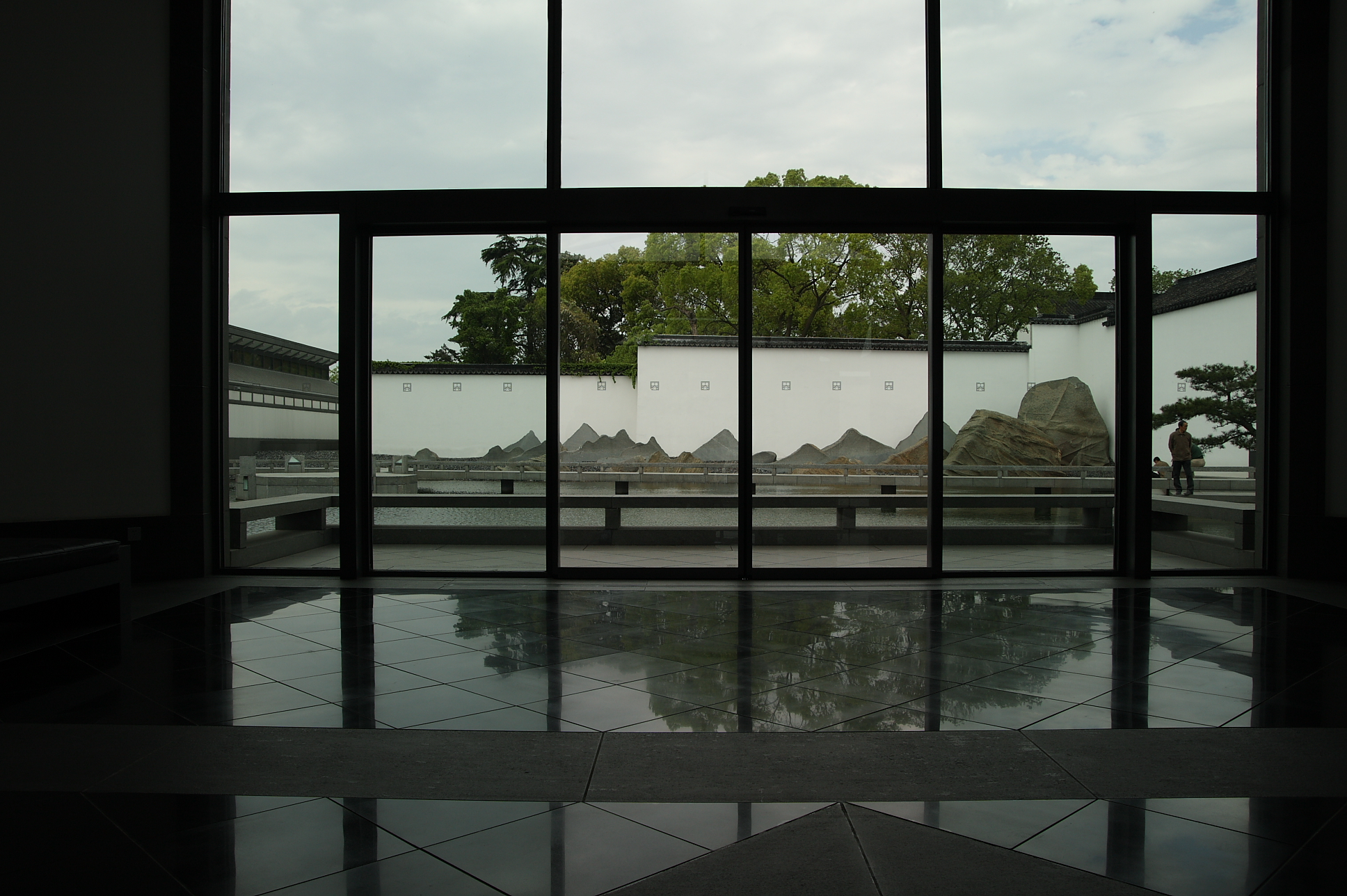
Suzhou Museum garden view from interior

=== Cultural ===
- Balai Khazanah Islam Sultan Haji Hassanal Bolkiah (BKISHHB) Museum, Brunei
- China Institute, Upper East Side, Manhattan, New York
- Dongfang City Coast Zone Urban Design International Competition, Hainan, China

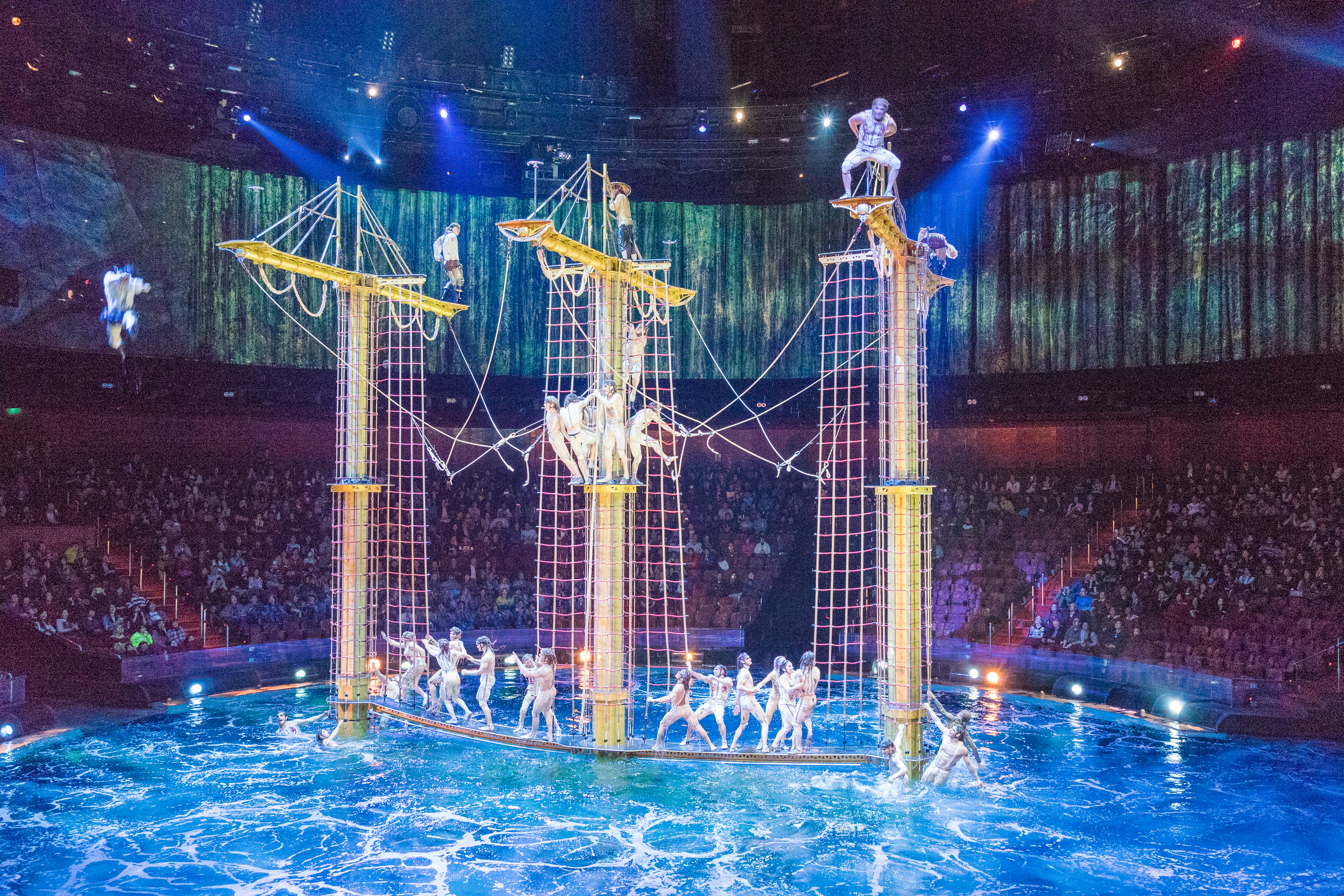
Inside the 2,000-seat Macau Dancing Water Theater

- Guanajuato State Library, León, Mexico
- Jianfu Palace Garden, Beijing, China
- Macau Dancing Water Theater, City of Dreams, Macau
- Macau Science Center, Macau
- Museum of Islamic Art Park, Doha, Qatar
- Nanhai Cultural Center International Design Competition, Guangzhou, Foshan City, China
- Six Dynasties Museum, Nanjing, China
- Suzhou Museum, Suzhou, China
- U.S. National Slavery Museum, Fredericksburg, Virginia, United States (unbuilt)

=== Health care ===
- Martha Stewart Center for Living at Mount Sinai, New York, New York
- Ronald Reagan UCLA Medical Center, Los Angeles, California

=== Residential ===
- The Centurion, New York City
- West Village Townhouse, New York City

=== Governmental ===
- Embassy of People's Republic of China in Washington, D.C.
