= Macau Scientific and Cultural Centre =

Building in Lisbon, Lisbon District, Portugal

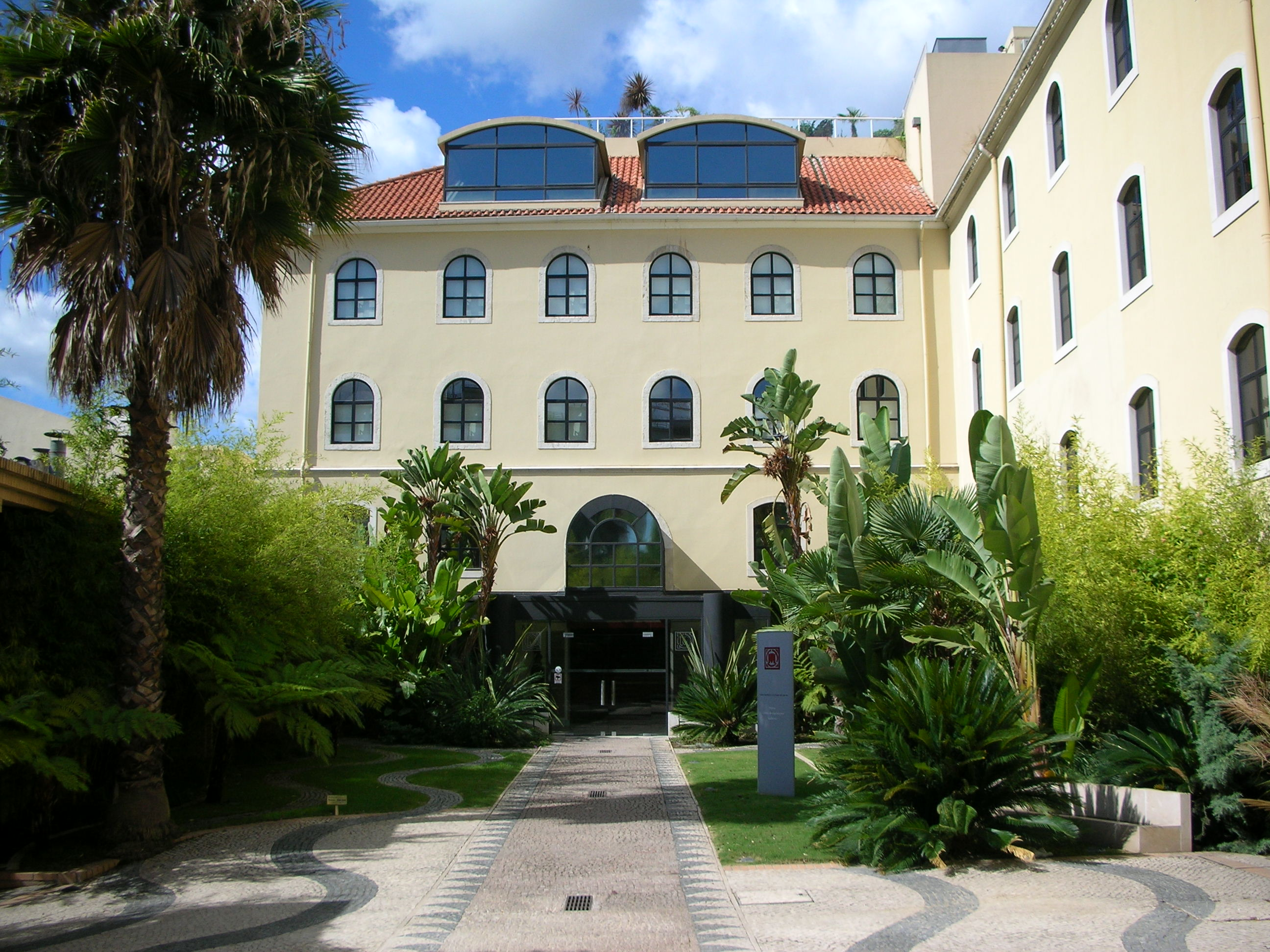
Macau Science and Culture Centre

The Macau Scientific and Cultural Centre (Portuguese: Centro Científico e Cultural de Macau, I.P.), endowed with administrative autonomy and individual capital, is a public institute integrated within the internal administration of the Portuguese state, under the supervision of the Ministry of Science, Technology and Higher Education.

The centre's mission is to produce, promote and disseminate knowledge about Macau as a platform between Portugal and the People's Republic of China, as well as between Europe and Asia. The centre is also a forum dedicated to studying and teaching the Chinese language and China's culture and history, and a centre for scientific research and ongoing and advanced training, on international relations between Portugal and China, and between Europe and Asia. The centre was created in 1995 by the initiative of the government in Macau in cooperation with the government of Portugal, and was inaugurated in 1999.

The centre's activities are developed within three main areas:

- Research (international and intercultural relations between Portugal/Europe and China/East Asia)
- Museum (comprising two distinct sections: a section on the historical and cultural condition of Macau in the 16th and 17th centuries, and a section displaying the centre's Chinese art collection
- Library (specialized in literature concerning China, Macau, East Asia, and European-Asian relations; most complete and up-to-date library on China in the entire Lusophone world)

== See also ==
- Macau Scientific and Cultural Centre Museum (The Macau Museum)
- Macao Science Center, Macau
