= Suzhou Museum =

Museum in Suzhou, Jiangsu, China

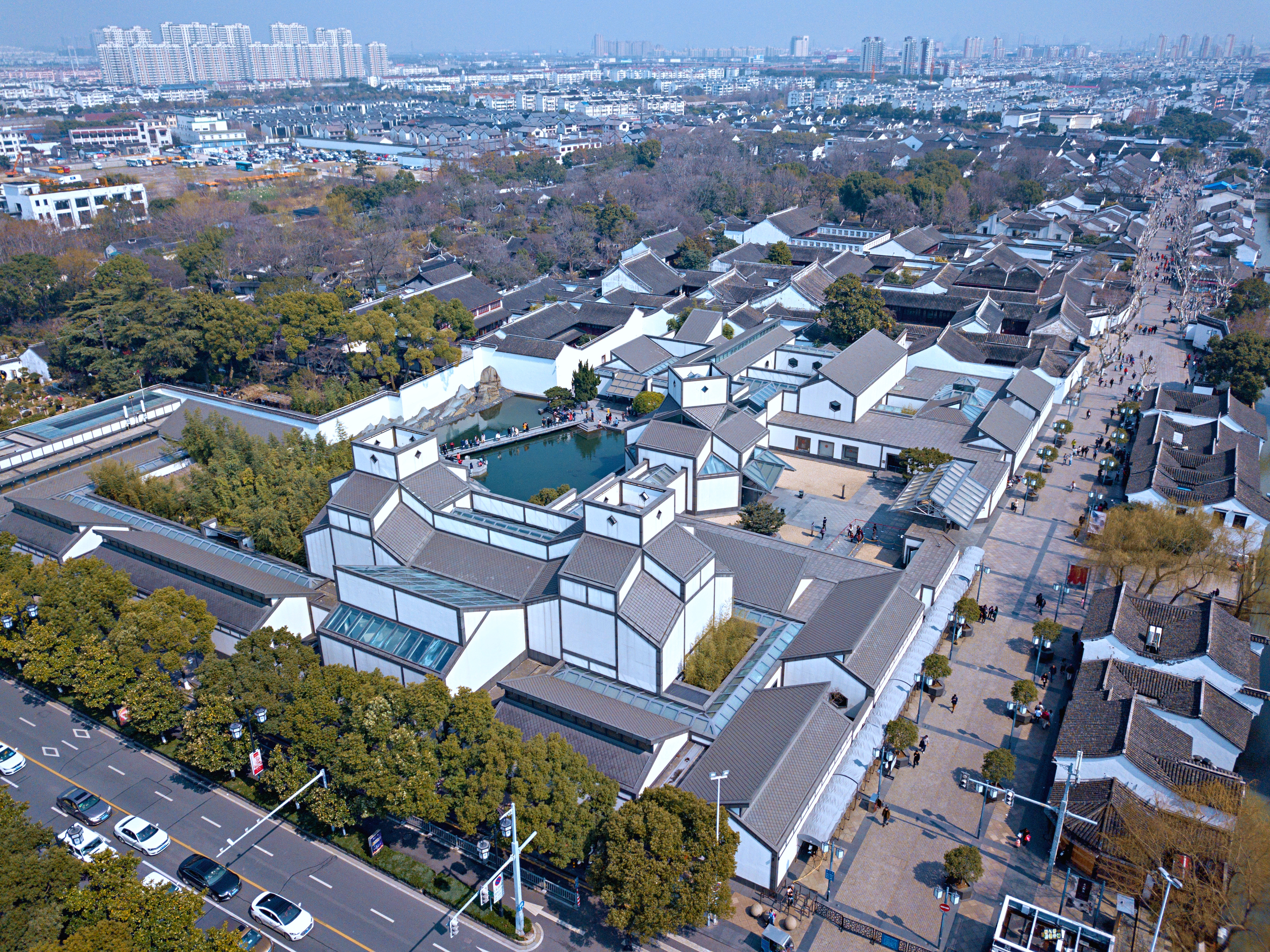
- Aerial view of Suzhou Museum
- Location: Suzhou, Jiangsu, China
- Coordinates: 31.3229°N 120.6278°E
- Visitors: 2,340,000 (2018)
- Architect: I. M. Pei

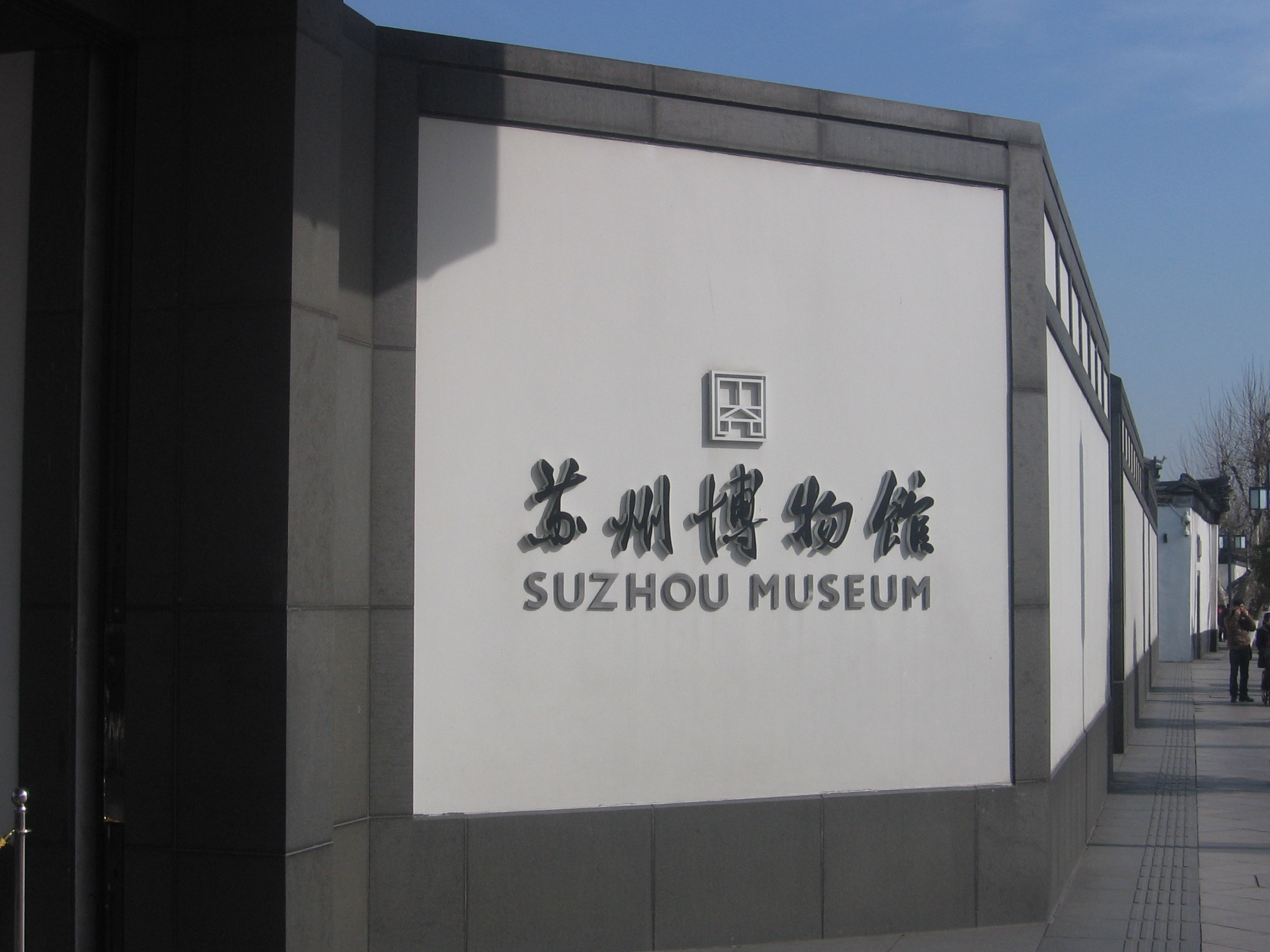
Suzhou Museum Main Entrance

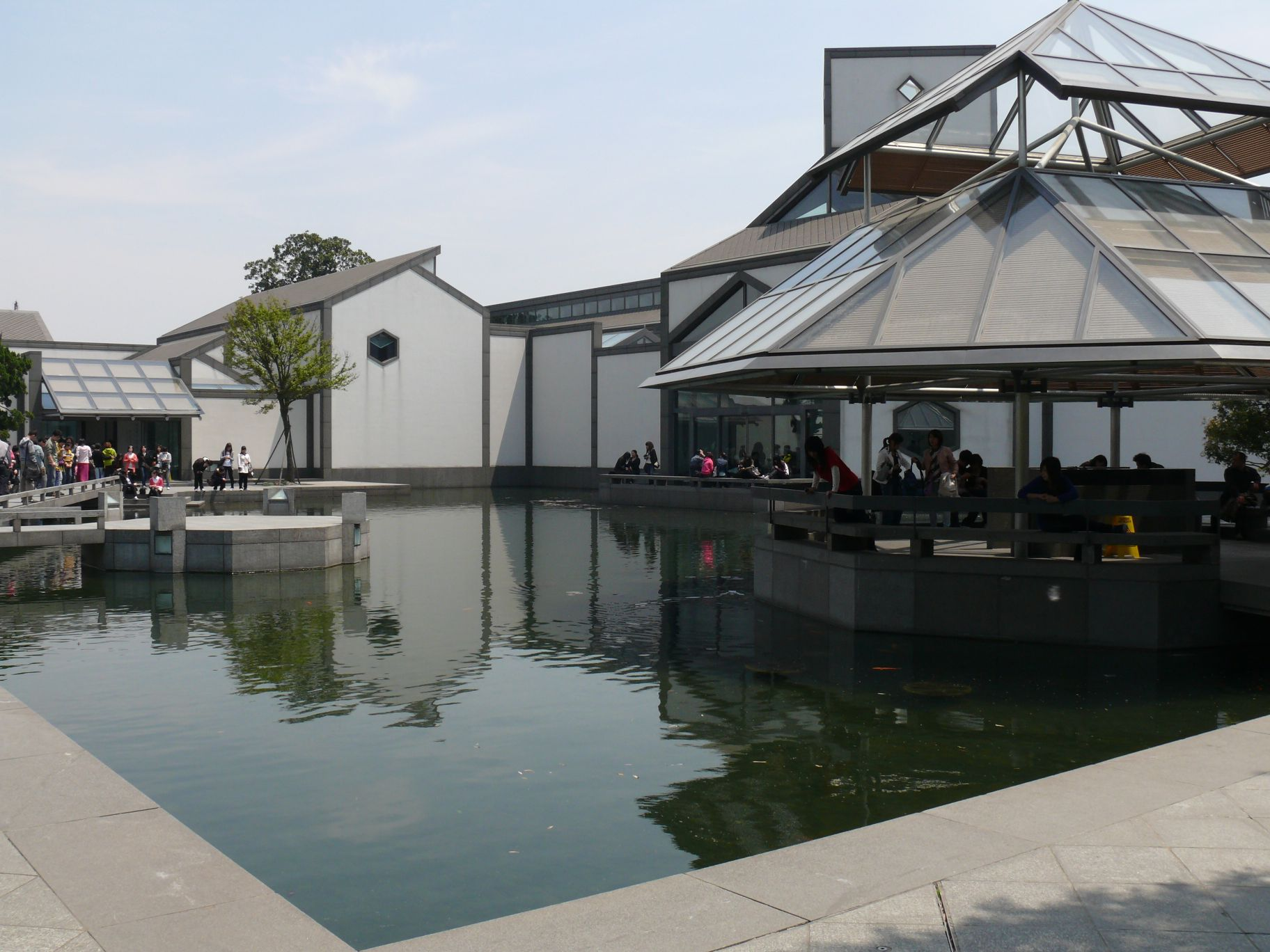
New part of Suzhou Museum (2010)

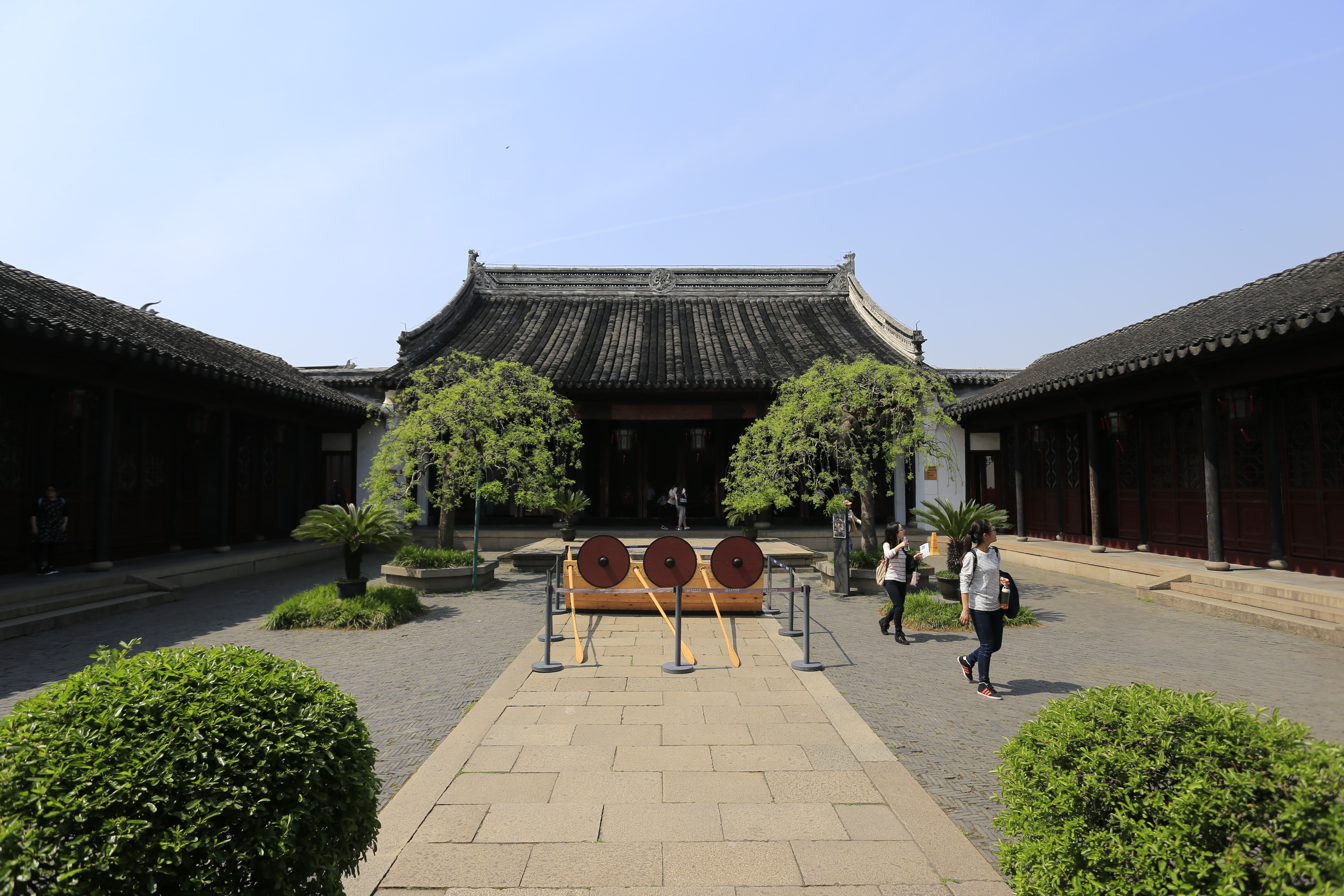
Old part of Suzhou Museum, formerly the Loyal Prince's House and secondary residence of the Jiangsu Provincial Governor

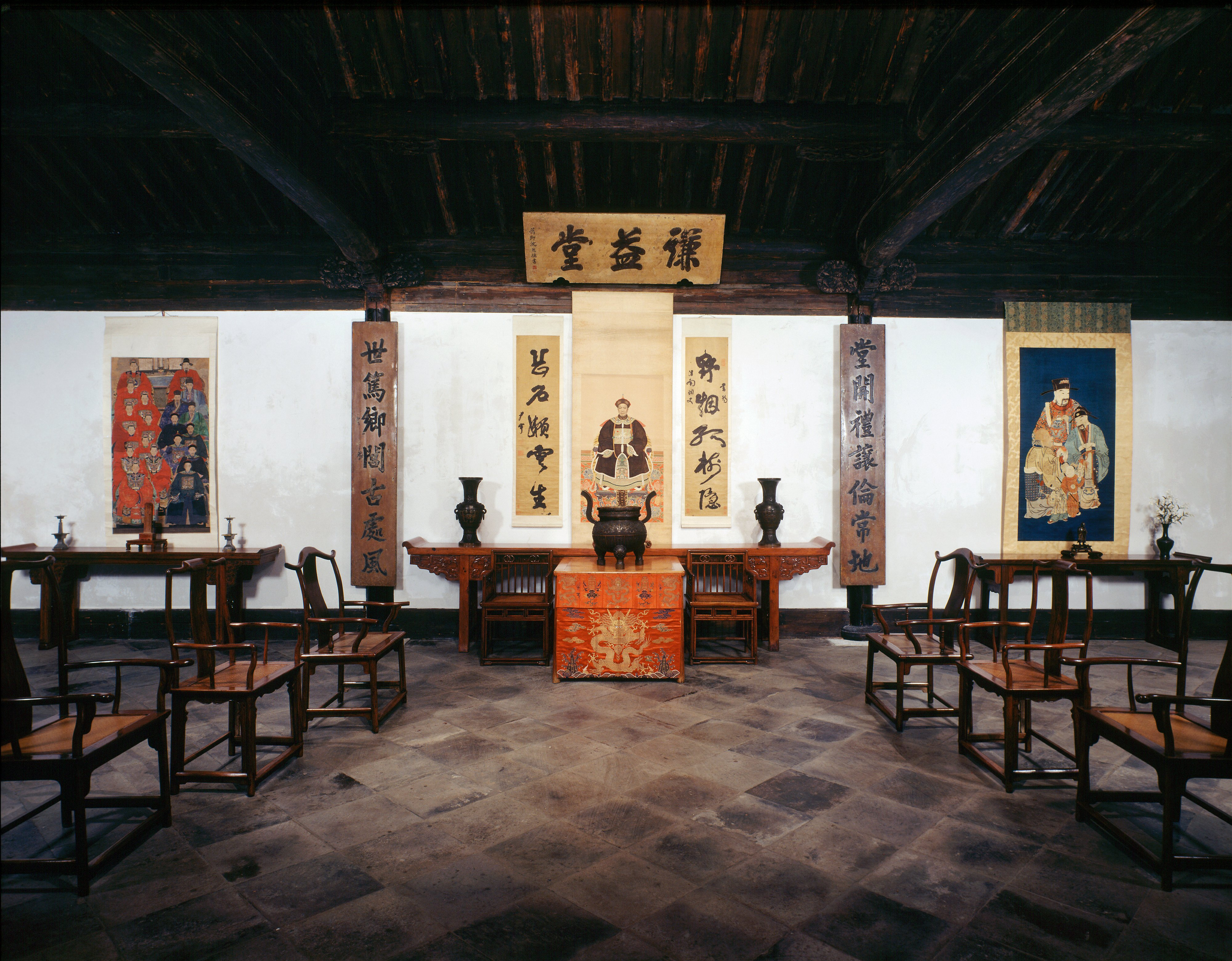
The Wu Family Reception Hall, early 17th century. This three-bay reception hall was originally part of a traditional Suzhou-style courtyard house located in the east Dongting district near the present town of Dongshan. Built in the early 1700s by the Wu family, it served as the main ceremonial hall (zhongtang) of a traditional upper-class home. It is now displayed at the Minneapolis Institute of Art, USA.

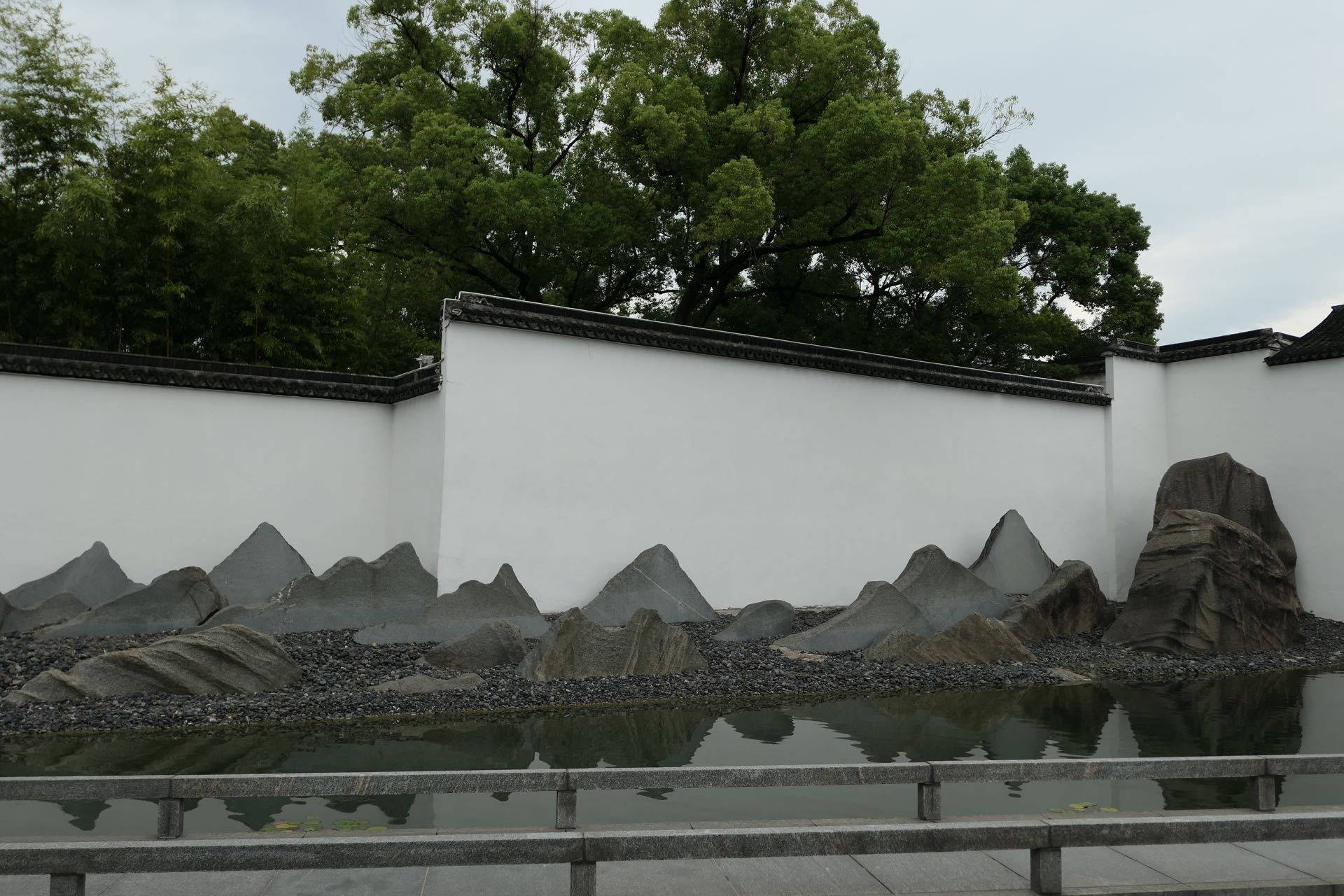
Iconic Layered Garden Rocks at the Central Water Court

The Suzhou Museum (Chinese: 蘇州博物館; pinyin: Sūzhōu Bówùguǎn) is a museum of ancient Chinese art, paintings, calligraphy and handmade crafts in Suzhou, Jiangsu, China. It is one of the most visited museums in the world, with more than 2 million visitors in 2018. The Folk Branch of the museum is at the Bei family ancestral temple near Lion Grove Garden. The Western New Pavilion was designed by renowned architect I.M. Pei and was completed and opened in 2006.

== History ==
The Suzhou Museum was founded in 1960, originally located in the former residence of Zhong Wang, an important general during the Taiping Rebellion. In 1986 the Suzhou Folk Museum, which later became the National Key Culture Relics Protection Unit, opened on the 2,500th anniversary of Suzhou's establishment. In 2006 the museum moved to its present location, a building designed by Suzhou-born Chinese-American architect I.M. Pei. The new building covers an area of 10,700 square meters (115,173 square feet) along with a construction area over 19000 square meters (20,451 square feet). In addition to the renovation of Taipingtianguo Zhongwang Mansion, the total construction area reaches 26,500 square meters (285,243 square feet), costing 3.39 million Chinese Yuan.

== Collections ==
The combined exhibition areas of the museum cover approximately 3,600 square meters. The museum houses approximately 30,000 pieces, including unearthed cultural relics, ancient paintings and calligraphy, and ancient crafts. It also possesses more than 70,000 books and documents and over 20,000 rubbings of stone inscriptions. The collection of paintings and calligraphy includes works of masters from the Song, Ming, and Qing dynasties.

The museum houses four permanent exhibitions: Relics of Wudi, National Treasure of Wu Tower, Wuzhong Fengya, and Wumen Calligraphy and Painting. The permanent collections display prehistoric pottery and jade and Buddhist cultural relics from the Tiger Hill Yunyan Temple and Ruiguang Temple. The Suzhou History Exhibition takes visitors through the history of the Suzhou area, covering the Paleolithic Age, the Ming and Qing dynasties, and the Spring and Autumn period when the settlement that would grow to become Suzhou was established.

The modern art exhibition has shown works by artists including Zao Wou-ki, Cai Guoqiang, and Xu Bing.

== Architecture ==
The Suzhou Museum building was designed by Pritzker Prize-winning architect I.M. Pei in association with Pei Partnership Architects. The structural engineering firm for this project was Leslie E. Robertson Associates. Construction began in 2002 and the building was inaugurated on October 6, 2006. The PBS American Masters television documentary series chronicled the design, construction, and inauguration of the new museum in a 2010 episode entitled "I.M. Pei: Building China Modern".

=== Design ===
Pei designed the museum using a blend of traditional Chinese design, local Suzhou flavor, and modern design. The essence of the old city is represented in the sloping roofs, a traditional color palette of black, white, and gray and traditional white stucco walls. The materials and construction give the building a modern feel. These include glass incorporated into the roof, a steel structure that replaces traditional wooden beam and rafter framing, and "China black" granite roof tiles instead of traditional brick tiles. The stone and glass roof admits natural light, which is regulated by metal sunshades.

=== Landscaping ===
The museum is placed between courtyards to harmonize the building with its surrounding environment. Pei designed a central courtyard and several small inner courtyards to complement the structure of the museum. The main courtyard is a creative landscape garden surrounded on the east, west and south sides by the museum structure. The north side of the courtyard is next to the Humble Administrator's Garden, the largest of Suzhou's classical gardens. The main courtyard was described as the most painstakingly designed of the museum's courtyards, and contains pebbled ponds, straight and winding bridges, octagonal pavilions, and a bamboo forest.

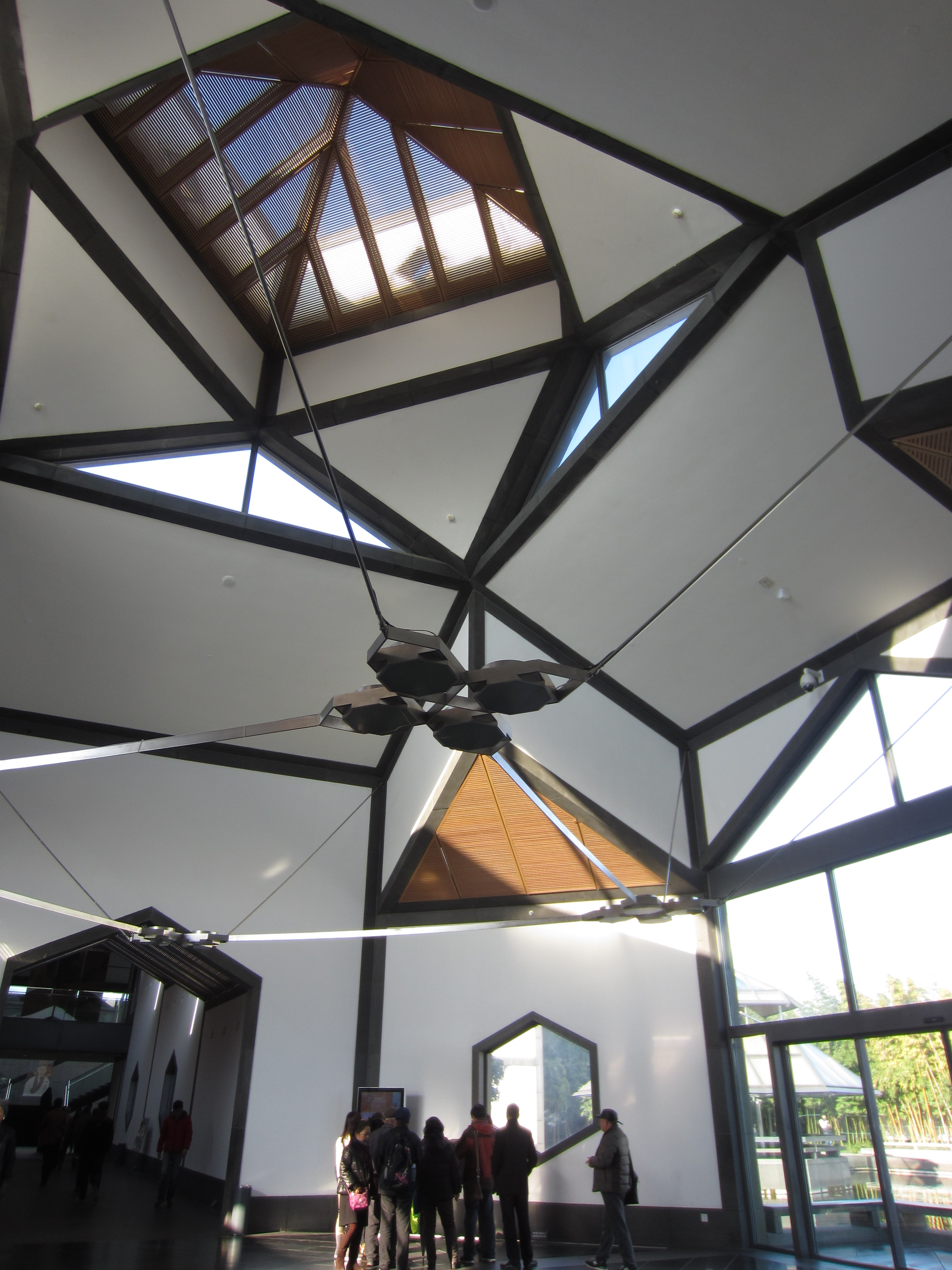
Interior of the Suzhou museum atrium

=== Use of geometric figures ===
Pei used simple geometric shapes such as octagons, rhombuses, and triangles as the building blocks of the museum's design. The atrium and several halls take an octagonal shape, and some windows are in the shape of rhombuses. The roofs and ceilings are a patchwork of triangles, rectangles, and rhombuses, which differentiates the structure from the traditional Suzhou buildings surrounding the museum.

== See also ==
- List of museums in China
