= List of ambassadors of Portugal to China =

Ambassador of Portugal to China
- Incumbent; Paulo Jorge Pereira do Nascimento since October 7, 2022
- Inaugural holder: Fernão Pires de Andrade
- Formation: 1511

The Portuguese ambassador in Beijing is the official representative of the Government in Lisbon to the Government of the People's Republic of China.

== History ==
- In 1511 Manuel I of Portugal sent Ambassador Fernão Pires de Andrade to China to ask for trading privileges.
- In 1517 a formal Portuguese embassy got bogged down in Chinese protocol and procrastination, and China expelled the Portuguese in 1522.
- In 1979 the government of Portugal left the Holy See as last European subject of international law with diplomatic relations with the government in Taipei.

== List of representatives ==
| Diplomatic agrément | Diplomatic accreditation | Ambassador | Observations | Residence | List of heads of state of Portugal | Emperor of China | Term end |
|---|---|---|---|---|---|---|---|
| May 18, 1727 | May 28, 1727 | Alexandre Metelo de Sousa e Meneses | Embaixador | Bangkok | Peter III of Portugal | Yongzheng Emperor | July 16, 1727 |
| May 1, 1753 | | Francisco Xavier Assis Pacheco e Sampaio Melo | Ministro Plenipotenciário | Bangkok | Peter III of Portugal | Qianlong Emperor | June 8, 1753 |
| January 1, 1862 | | José Maria de Sousa Horta e Costa | Minister Plenipotentiary: resident in Macao, accredited in Japan and Siam. Between 1862 and 1902, diplomatic representatives of Portugal in China combine their functions with those of Governor of Macao and Timorese. (Lista de governadores de Macau) | Bangkok | Luís I of Portugal | Empress Dowager Cixi | March 18, 1902 |
| December 3, 1862 | | Visconde da Praia Grande de Macau | Legation to China, Japan and Siam. | Bangkok | Luís I of Portugal | Empress Dowager Cixi | April 22, 1863 |
| April 22, 1863 | | José Rodrigues Coelho do Amaral | Legation to China, Japan and Siam. | Bangkok | Luís I of Portugal | Empress Dowager Cixi | August 14, 1866 |
| October 26, 1866 | | José Maria da Ponte e Horta | Legation to China, Japan and Siam. | Bangkok | Luís I of Portugal | Empress Dowager Cixi | June 3, 1868 |
| August 3, 1868 | | António Sérgio de Sousa | Legation to China, Japan and Siam. | Bangkok | Luís I of Portugal | Empress Dowager Cixi | January 27, 1872 |
| February 27, 1872 | | Visconde de S. Januário | Legation to China, Japan and Siam. | Bangkok | Luís I of Portugal | Empress Dowager Cixi | September 16, 1875 |
| January 1, 1874 | | Januário Correia de Almeida | | Bangkok | Luís I of Portugal | Empress Dowager Cixi | |
| September 16, 1875 | | José Maria Lobo D'Ávila | | Bangkok | Luís I of Portugal | Empress Dowager Cixi | September 27, 1876 |
| September 27, 1876 | | Visconde de Paço de Arcos | | Bangkok | Luís I of Portugal | Empress Dowager Cixi | September 25, 1878 |
| November 27, 1879 | | Joaquim José da Graça | | Bangkok | Luís I of Portugal | Empress Dowager Cixi | March 8, 1883 |
| May 23, 1883 | | Tomás de Sousa Rosa | | Bangkok | Luís I of Portugal | Empress Dowager Cixi | July 25, 1886 |
| January 26, 1887 | | Firmino José da Costa | | Bangkok | Luís I of Portugal | Empress Dowager Cixi | |
| April 28, 1887 | | Tomás de Sousa Rosa | Missão Especial | non resident | Luís I of Portugal | Empress Dowager Cixi | |
| November 5, 1887 | | João José da Silva | Chargé d'affaires | Bangkok | Luís I of Portugal | Empress Dowager Cixi | |
| February 5, 1889 | | Francisco Teixeira da Silva | | Bangkok | Carlos I of Portugal | Empress Dowager Cixi | March 31, 1890 |
| April 2, 1890 | | Coronel Francisco Augusto Ferreira da Silva | Chargé d'affaires | Bangkok | Carlos I of Portugal | Empress Dowager Cixi | October 28, 1890 |
| October 28, 1890 | | Custódio Miguel Borja | Chargé d'affaires | Bangkok | Carlos I of Portugal | Empress Dowager Cixi | |
| April 15, 1891 | | Custódio Miguel Borja | | Bangkok | Carlos I of Portugal | Empress Dowager Cixi | December 23, 1893 |
| March 24, 1894 | | José de Sousa Horta e Costa | | Bangkok | Carlos I of Portugal | Empress Dowager Cixi | February 11, 1897 |
| May 12, 1897 | | Eduardo Augusto Rodrigues Galhardo | | Bangkok | Carlos I of Portugal | Empress Dowager Cixi | July 5, 1900 |
| August 13, 1900 | | José Maria de Sousa Horta e Costa | | Bangkok | Carlos I of Portugal | Empress Dowager Cixi | October 10, 1902 |
| January 24, 1902 | January 23, 1902 | José de Azevedo Castelo Branco | | Bangkok | Carlos I of Portugal | Empress Dowager Cixi | August 10, 1903 |
| October 20, 1903 | February 21, 1904 | José de Azevedo Castelo Branco | | Bangkok | Carlos I of Portugal | Empress Dowager Cixi | November 19, 1904 |
| November 19, 1904 | | Gabriel de Almeida Santos | Chargé d'affaires | Bangkok | Carlos I of Portugal | Empress Dowager Cixi | |
| March 2, 1905 | | Ignácio de Costa Duarte | Chargé d'affaires | Bangkok | Carlos I of Portugal | Empress Dowager Cixi | |
| December 2, 1907 | | Martinho Teixeira Homem de Brederode | Chargé d'affaires | Bangkok | Carlos I of Portugal | Empress Dowager Cixi | April 25, 1908 |
| December 2, 1907 | | Gabriel de Almeida Santos | Chargé d'affaires | Bangkok | Carlos I of Portugal | Empress Dowager Cixi | January 1, 2006 |
| April 25, 1908 | April 25, 1908 | Barão de Sendal | also accredited in Bangkok and Tokyo. | Beijing | Manuel II of Portugal | Puyi | October 7, 1910 |
| September 30, 1911 | | Henrique O'Connor Martins | Chargé d'affaires | Beijing | Manuel José de Arriaga | Puyi | May 19, 1913 |

| Diplomatic agrément | Diplomatic accreditation | Ambassador | Observations | Residence | List of heads of state of Portugal | List of premiers of China | Term end |
|---|---|---|---|---|---|---|---|
| January 10, 1913 | January 20, 1914 | José Batalha de Freitas | *In 1919 the legation was transferred to Bangkok. | Beijing | Manuel José de Arriaga | Xiong Xiling | March 13, 1925 |
| September 25, 1925 | October 8, 1925 | João António de Bianchi | | Beijing | Bernardino Machado | Xu Shiying | March 25, 1929 |
| March 25, 1929 | March 31, 1930 | Luís Esteves Fernandes | Chargé d'affaires | Nanjing | António de Oliveira Salazar | Tan Yankai | January 6, 1931 |
| January 6, 1931 | December 30, 1930 | Armando Navarro | *In 1937 the legation was transferred to Shanghai. | Nanjing | António de Oliveira Salazar | Chiang Kai-shek | February 7, 1938 |
| July 11, 1938 | | João Maria da Silva Lebre e Lima | Ministro Plenipotenciário | Shanghai | António de Oliveira Salazar | H. H. Kung | October 16, 1945 |
| October 11, 1946 | | João de Barros Ferreira da Fonseca | | Nanjing | António de Oliveira Salazar | Chiang Kai-shek | November 1, 1949 |
| June 11, 1946 | | Joao Rodrigues Simoes Affra | Chargé d'affaires | Nanjing | António de Oliveira Salazar | Chiang Kai-shek | December 18, 1950 |
| April 19, 1979 | April 26, 1979 | João de Deus Pereira Bramão Ramos | Encarregado de Negócios | Beijing | António Ramalho Eanes | Hua Guofeng | September 10, 1979 |
| September 10, 1979 | September 19, 1979 | António Eduardo de carvalho Ressano Garcia | | Beijing | António Ramalho Eanes | Hua Guofeng | July 13, 1982 |
| June 3, 1982 | June 8, 1982 | António Leal da Costa Lobo | | Beijing | António Ramalho Eanes | Zhao Ziyang | June 1, 1985 |
| August 10, 1985 | August 19, 1985 | Octávio Neto Valério | 1961: Mr. Nyerere stated in the National Assembly that recognition accorded to the Portuguese Consul-General, Senhor Octavio Neto Valerio, to be Consul-General for Portugal in Tanganyika had been revoked from October 17. | Beijing | António Ramalho Eanes | Zhao Ziyang | August 31, 1989 |
| September 24, 1989 | September 29, 1989 | José Manuel Peixoto de Vilas Boas de Vasconcelos Faria | | Beijing | Mário Soares | Li Peng | October 30, 1993 |
| October 13, 1993 | November 15, 1993 | José Manuel Duarte de Jesus | | Beijing | Mário Soares | Li Peng | April 6, 1997 |
| April 6, 1997 | April 15, 1997 | Pedro Manuel dos Reis Alves Catarino | | Beijing | Jorge Sampaio | Li Peng | September 28, 2002 |
| October 7, 2002 | | António Nunes de Carvalho Santana Carlos | | Beijing | Jorge Sampaio | Zhu Rongji | October 1, 2006 |
| October 2, 2006 | | Rui Quartin Santos | | Beijing | Aníbal Cavaco Silva | Wen Jiabao | May 6, 2010 |
| May 8, 2010 | July 30, 2010 | José Tadeu da Costa Soares | | Beijing | Aníbal Cavaco Silva | Wen Jiabao | April 4, 2013 |
| April 5, 2013 | April 5, 2013 | Jorge Ryder Torres Pereira | 10th Portuguese ambassador in Beijing | Beijing | Aníbal Cavaco Silva | Li Keqiang | November 16, 2017 |
| November 15, 2017 | December 5, 2017 | José Augusto de Jesus Duarte | | Beijing | Marcelo Rebelo de Sousa | Li Keqiang | October 2022 |
| October 7, 2022 | | Paulo Jorge Pereira do Nascimento | | Beijing | Marcelo Rebelo de Sousa | Li Keqiang | |
