= Pedro Barros (disambiguation) =

Pedro Barros may refer to:

- Pedro Barros (born 1995), a Brazilian skateboarder
- Pedro García Barros (born 1946), a Chilean football midfielder
- Pedro Barros (volleyballer), a Portuguese volleyballer who played on S.L. Benfica
- Pedro Correia de Barros (1911–1968), a Portuguese navy officer and colonial administrator
- Pedro Ignacio de Castro Barros, (1777–1849), an Argentine statesman and priest
