= YP1967 =

2017 Hong Kong documentary by Can To

- Directed by: Can To
- Release date: 2017
- Running time: 72 minutes
- Country: Hong Kong
- Language: Chinese

YP1967 is a 72-minute Hong Kong documentary directed by Can To. The documentary was released in 2017, marking the 50th anniversary of the 1967 Hong Kong riots. It looks back on a group of juvenile prisoners who were involved in the event. "YP" is the abbreviation for "Young Prisoner", which is also their inmate numbers, while 1967 refers to the year the riots took place.

== Background ==
At the time, the Cultural Revolution ideology from mainland China spread to Hong Kong. Encouraged by the success of the leftist faction in Macau in seizing power during the "12-3 incident," Hong Kong leftists began staging multiple "political strikes" by exploiting labor disputes and conflicts among workers.

In April 1967, a labor dispute broke out at a Hong Kong artificial flower factory. Leftist labor unions actively intervened, escalating the conflict into the 1967 riots. In the early stages, Hong Kong youth responded to calls from leftist leaders to take to the streets and protest. As the situation progressed, leftists resorted to widespread violence, including placing over a thousand indiscriminate homemade bombs throughout urban areas, resulting in at least 51 deaths.

== Content ==
The documentary primarily tells the story of a group of Hong Kong juvenile prisoners during the 1967 Hong Kong riots. It features interviews conducted 50 years later with six former juvenile prisoners who had participated in the riots. Most of the interviewees were convicted by the British Hong Kong government for minor offenses, such as posting protest slogans and newspapers or participating in illegal assemblies, rather than direct involvement in violent demonstrations. However, one of them were charged with possession of explosives at the time.
