= Maria Anna Acciaioli Tamagnini =

Portuguese poet and philanthropist

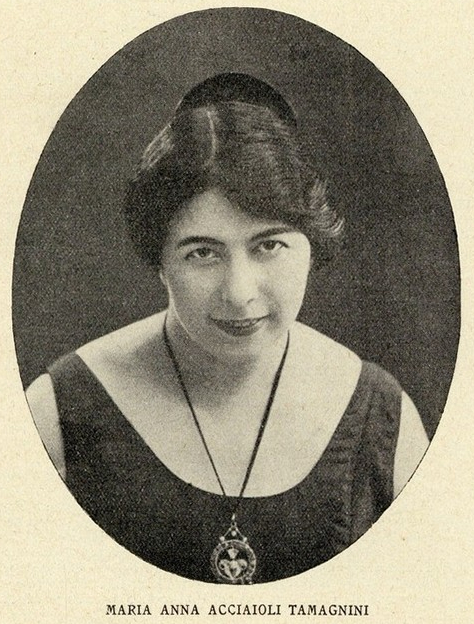
Maria Anna Acciaioli Tamagnini

Maria Anna Acciaioli Tamagnini (23 July 1900 - 5 July 1933) was a Portuguese poet and philanthropist. She engaged in a number of charitable works in Macau, where her husband was appointed the Governor. She published a well-received book of poetry, titled Lin-Tchi-Fá, or Flor de Lótus, in 1925, which has subsequently been re-issued several times.

== Biography ==
She was born as Maria Anna Acciaioli de Magalhães Colaço in Torres Vedras, in Portugal, on 23 July 1900. Her father, Manuel de Barros de Fonseca Acciaioli Coutinho was a judge, and her mother was Dona Lia de Magalhães Colaço. She had three sisters. She was educated at the Faculty of Arts, in Lisbon. She met Arthur Tamagnini de Sousa Barbosa, when he was engaged to tutor her, and they married soon after meeting, in 1916. Together, they had five children, one of whom (Alberto Manuel) died in childhood. Her surviving children were Artur Manuel Acciaioli Tamagnini Barbosa, Miguel Ângelo, and Marco António.

In 1918, Arthur Tamagnini de Sousa Barbosa was appointed as the colonial administrator for Macau, by the Portuguese government. He held office there for three successive terms. He was accompanied by Maria Anna, who taught French and French Literature, and studied Cantonese, learning the language. She also engaged in philanthropic works, including supporting the arts and establishing an asylum for indigent people.

She is best known for her book of poetry, titled Lin-Tchi-Fá, or Flor de Lótus, which was published in 1925, and was received with acclaim in Portuguese society. It was inspired by her experiences of living in Macau, and of her meetings with Chinese, Japanese, and Macanese women.

Maria Anna Acciaioli Tamagnini died in 1933, in Lisbon, following complications relating to childbirth.
