= Mayor of Macau =

Mayor of Macau may refer to:

- Governor of Macau, during its colonial period
- Chief Executive of Macau, following its return to China as a Special Administrative Region
