= José Eduardo Martinho Garcia Leandro =

Portuguese lieutenant-general and former colonial administrator

José Eduardo Martinho Garcia Leandro CvA ComA GCIH

Governor of Macau
- In office 19 November 1974 – 27 November 1979
- President: Francisco da Costa Gomes; António Ramalho Eanes
- Prime Minister: Vasco dos Santos Gonçalves; José Baptista Pinheiro de Azevedo; Vasco Fernando Leotte de Almeida e Costa; Mário Alberto Nobre Lopes Soares; Alfredo Nobre da Costa; Carlos Alberto da Mota Pinto; Maria de Lourdes Ruivo da Silva de Matos Pintasilgo
- Preceded by: José Manuel de Sousa e Faro Nobre de Carvalho
- Succeeded by: Nuno Viriato Tavares de Melo Egídio

Personal details
- Born: 3 June 1940 (age 86) Luanda, Angola, Portugal
- Education: Colégio Militar; Military Academy

Chinese name
- Chinese: 李安道
Transcriptions
Standard Mandarin
- Hanyu Pinyin: Lǐ Āndào
Yue: Cantonese
- Jyutping: lei5 on1 dou6

José Eduardo Martinho Garcia Leandro (June 3, 1940) is a Portuguese lieutenant-general and former colonial administrator. He is currently a member of the General Council of Universidade Aberta, professor at the Institute of Political Studies at the Catholic University of Portugal, curator and administrator of the Jorge Álvares Foundation and corresponding academic at the International Academy of Portuguese Culture.

== Biography ==
Leandro began his military career at the Colégio Militar in 1950. He joined the Military Academy in 1957, where he completed the Artillery course in 1960. Later, he had mobilized for various service commissions in Angola, Guinea, Timor and Macau.

He served as chief of staff of Governor of Timor from 1968 to 1970. On 19 November 1974, he was appointed the Governor of Macau, replacing José Manuel de Sousa e Faro Nobre de Carvalho. During his tenure, he drew up the Estatuto Orgânico de Macau, an organic law which was later approved by Portuguese legislation on 17 February 1976, reclassified Macau as a "Chinese territory under Portuguese administration" (território chinês sob administração portuguesa). He left office on 27 November 1979.

== Works ==
- Timor: um país para o século XXI
- Macau nos Anos da Revolução Portuguesa 1974-1979

== Honours ==
- Grand Cross of Order of Prince Henry (13 January 1981)
- Knight of Military Order of Aviz (14 July 1983)
- Commander of Military Order of Aviz (10 June 1992)

Political offices
Preceded by José Manuel de Sousa e Faro Nobre de Carvalho	Governor of Macau; 1974–1979	Succeeded by Nuno Viriato Tavares de Melo Egídio
