= Nuno Viriato Tavares de Melo Egídio =

Portuguese general

Governor of Macau
- In office 28 November 1979 – 16 June 1981
- President: António Ramalho Eanes
- Prime Minister: Maria de Lourdes Ruivo da Silva de Matos Pintasilgo; Francisco Sá Carneiro; Diogo Pinto de Freitas do Amaral; Francisco José Pereira Pinto Balsemão
- Preceded by: José Eduardo Martinho Garcia Leandro
- Succeeded by: Vasco de Almeida e Costa

Personal details
- Born: 18 February 1922 Tomar, Portugal
- Died: 7 December 2011 (aged 89) Lisbon, Portugal

Chinese name
- Chinese: 伊芝迪
Transcriptions
Standard Mandarin
- Hanyu Pinyin: Yī Zhīdí
Yue: Cantonese
- Jyutping: ji1 zi1 dik6

Nuno Viriato Tavares de Melo Egídio (Tomar, 18 February 1922 – Lisbon, 7 December 2011) was a Portuguese general.

He served as Governor of Macau from 1979 to 1981. He was also head of the Armed Forces General Staff from 1981 to 1984.

Political offices
Preceded by José Eduardo Martinho Garcia Leandro	Governor of Macau; 1979–1981	Succeeded by Vasco de Almeida e Costa
