= Jaime Silvério Marques =

Portuguese military officer

Jaime Silvério Marques OA ComA GOI
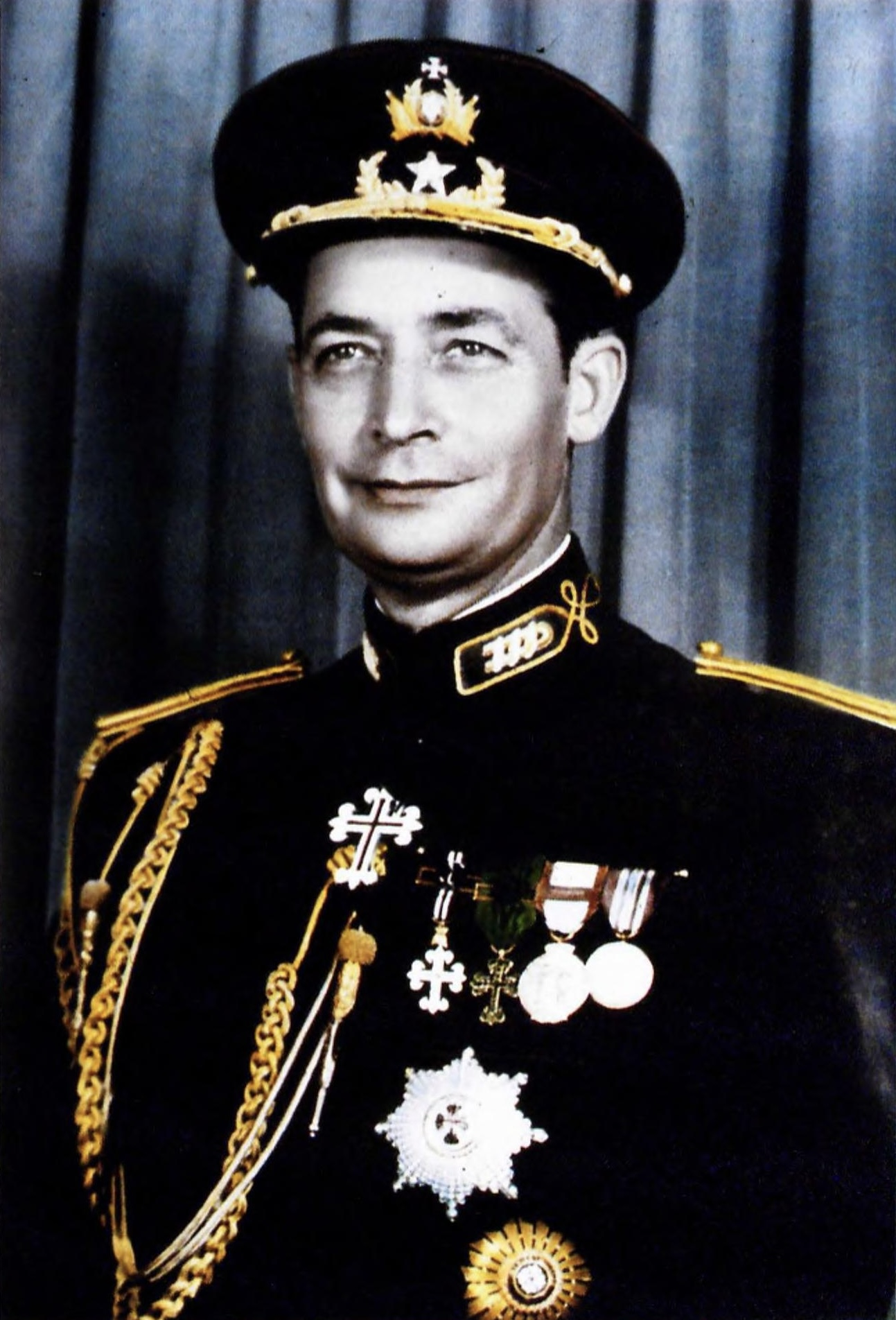

Governor of Macau
- In office 18 September 1959 – 17 April 1962
- President: Américo Tomás
- Prime Minister: António de Oliveira Salazar
- Preceded by: Pedro Correia de Barros
- Succeeded by: António Lopes dos Santos

Member of National Salvation Junta
- In office 29 April 1974 – 30 September 1974

Personal details
- Born: 1915 Portugal
- Died: 14 January 1986 (aged 70–71) Lisbon, Portugal

Chinese name
- Traditional Chinese: 馬濟時
- Simplified Chinese: 马济时
Transcriptions
Standard Mandarin
- Hanyu Pinyin: Mǎ Jìshí
Yue: Cantonese
- Jyutping: maa5 zai3 si4

Jaime Silvério Marques (1915 – 14 January 1986) was a Portuguese brigadier-general and colonial administrator.

== Biography ==
Marques completed the Military engineering course at the Army School in 1940, shortly afterwards integrated in the Expeditionary Corps sent to the Azores. He had been mobilized for various service commissions in Azores, India, Macau and Angola.

On 18 September 1959, he was appointed the Governor of Macau, replacing Pedro Correia de Barros. In February 1961, he designated Macau as a "permanent gaming religion", and officially positioned Macau as a low taxation region. Since then, gaming and tourism was regarded as Macau's major economic activities. He left office on 17 April 1962.

When on 25 April 1974 the Carnation Revolution broke out in Portugal, Marques joined the National Salvation Junta that took power. On 29 April, he was appointed Chief of Staff of the Army. On 30 September, he was removed from the National Salvation Junta together with Carlos Galvão de Melo and Manuel Diogo Neto, just after the resignation of António de Spínola.

In Macau, Avenue of Governor Jaime Silvério Marques (Avenida do Governador Jaime Silvério Marques, 馬濟時總督大馬路) was named after him.

Political offices
Preceded by Pedro Correia de Barros	Governor of Macau; 1959–1962	Succeeded by António Lopes dos Santos
