= Henrique Monteiro Correia da Silva =

Portuguese statesman, navy officer and colonial administrator

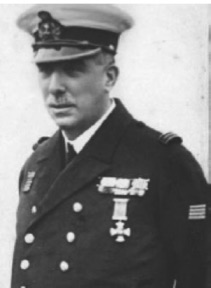

Governor of Macau
- In office 23 August 1919 – 5 January 1923
- Preceded by: Artur Tamagnini de Sousa Barbosa
- Succeeded by: Rodrigo José Rodrigues

Minister of the Colonies
- In office 16 February 1925 – 1 July 1925
- Preceded by: António de Paiva Gomes
- Succeeded by: Filemon de Almeida

Personal details
- Born: 8 December 1878 Macau, Portugal
- Died: 2 November 1935 (aged 56) Lisbon, Portugal

Chinese name
- Traditional Chinese: 施利華
- Simplified Chinese: 施利华
Transcriptions
Standard Mandarin
- Hanyu Pinyin: Shī Lìhuá
Yue: Cantonese
- Jyutping: si1 lei6 waa4

Henrique Monteiro Correia da Silva (8 December 1878 – 2 November 1935), often referred to as Henrique Paço d'Arcos, was a Portuguese statesman, navy officer and colonial administrator.

== Biography ==
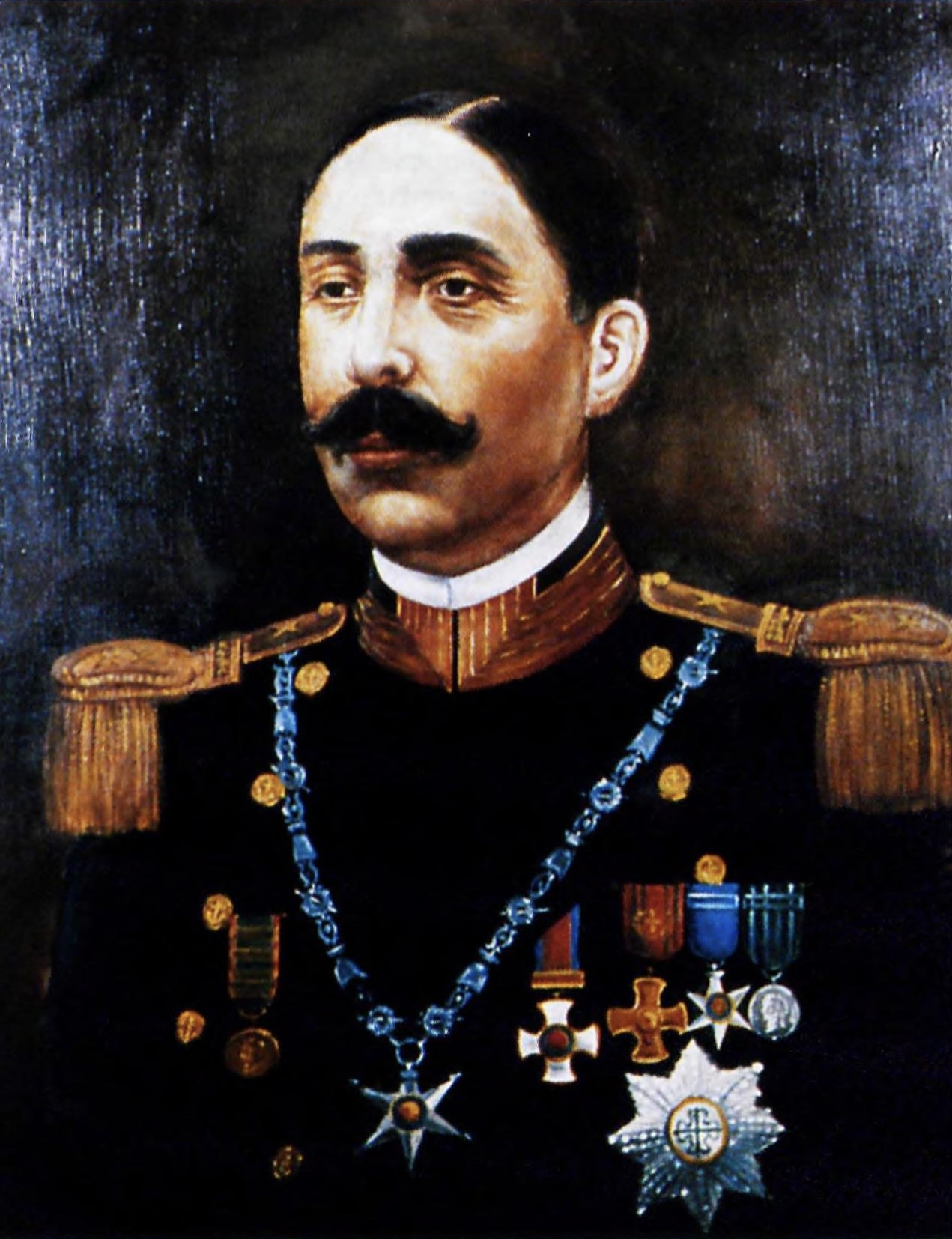
Henrique Correia da Silva while Governor of Macau

Henrique Paço d'Arcos was a son of Carlos Eugénio Correia da Silva. He served as Governor of Macau from 23 August 1919 to 5 January 1923. During his tenure, he showed great diplomatic talent in his relationship with the Chinese government. Later, he served as Minister of the Colonies in Guimarães cabinet from 16 February to 1 July 1925.

Henrique was also father of writer Joaquim Paço d'Arcos and Henrique Belford Correia da Silva (2nd Count of Paço de Arcos).

== Honours ==
- Knight of Order of the Tower and Sword
- Distinguished Service Order
- Commander of Military Order of Aviz (11 March 1910)

== Work ==
- Memórias de Guerra no Mar

Political offices
Preceded by Artur Tamagnini de Sousa Barbosa	Governor of Macau; 1919–1923	Succeeded by Rodrigo José Rodrigues
Preceded by António de Paiva Gomes	Minister of the Colonies; 16 February 1925–1 July 1925	Succeeded by Filemon de Almeida
