= Rodrigo José Rodrigues =

Portuguese politician

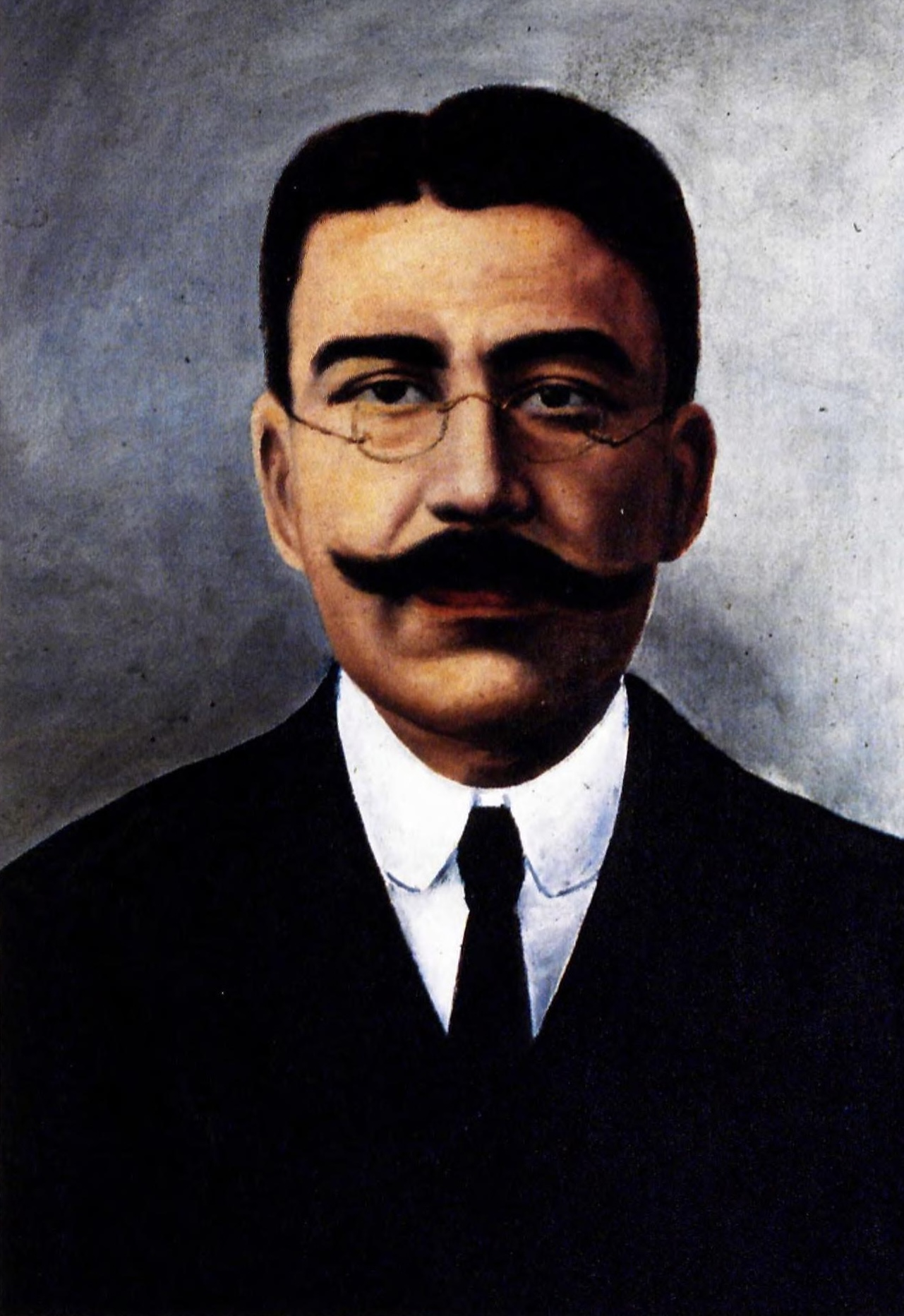

Ministry of the Interior
- In office 9 January 1913 – 9 February 1914
- Preceded by: Duarte Leite
- Succeeded by: Bernardino Machado

Governor of Macau
- In office 5 January 1923 – 18 October 1925
- Preceded by: Henrique Monteiro Correia da Silva
- Succeeded by: Manuel Firmino de Almeida Maia Magalhães

Personal details
- Born: 26 July 1879 Celorico de Basto, Portugal
- Died: 18 January 1963 (aged 83)

Chinese name
- Traditional Chinese: 羅德禮
- Simplified Chinese: 罗德礼
Transcriptions
Standard Mandarin
- Hanyu Pinyin: Luó Délǐ
Yue: Cantonese
- Jyutping: lo4 dak1 lai5

Rodrigo José Rodrigues (26 July 1879 – 18 January 1963) was a military physician, colonial administrator and politician who held prominent roles during the First Portuguese Republic.

== Career ==
He was Minister of the Interior (1913–1914), Civil Governor of the District of Aveiro and the District of Porto, Governor of Macau (1922–1924) and attaché of the Portuguese legation to the Society of Nations (1924–1927).

Rodrigues was a physician in Cape Verde and Goa and a professor at Goa Medical School before 1910.

He participated in the Portuguese delegation of the League of Nations from 1925 to 1927.
