= Arnaldo de Novais Guedes Rebelo =

Portuguese colonial administrator and military officer

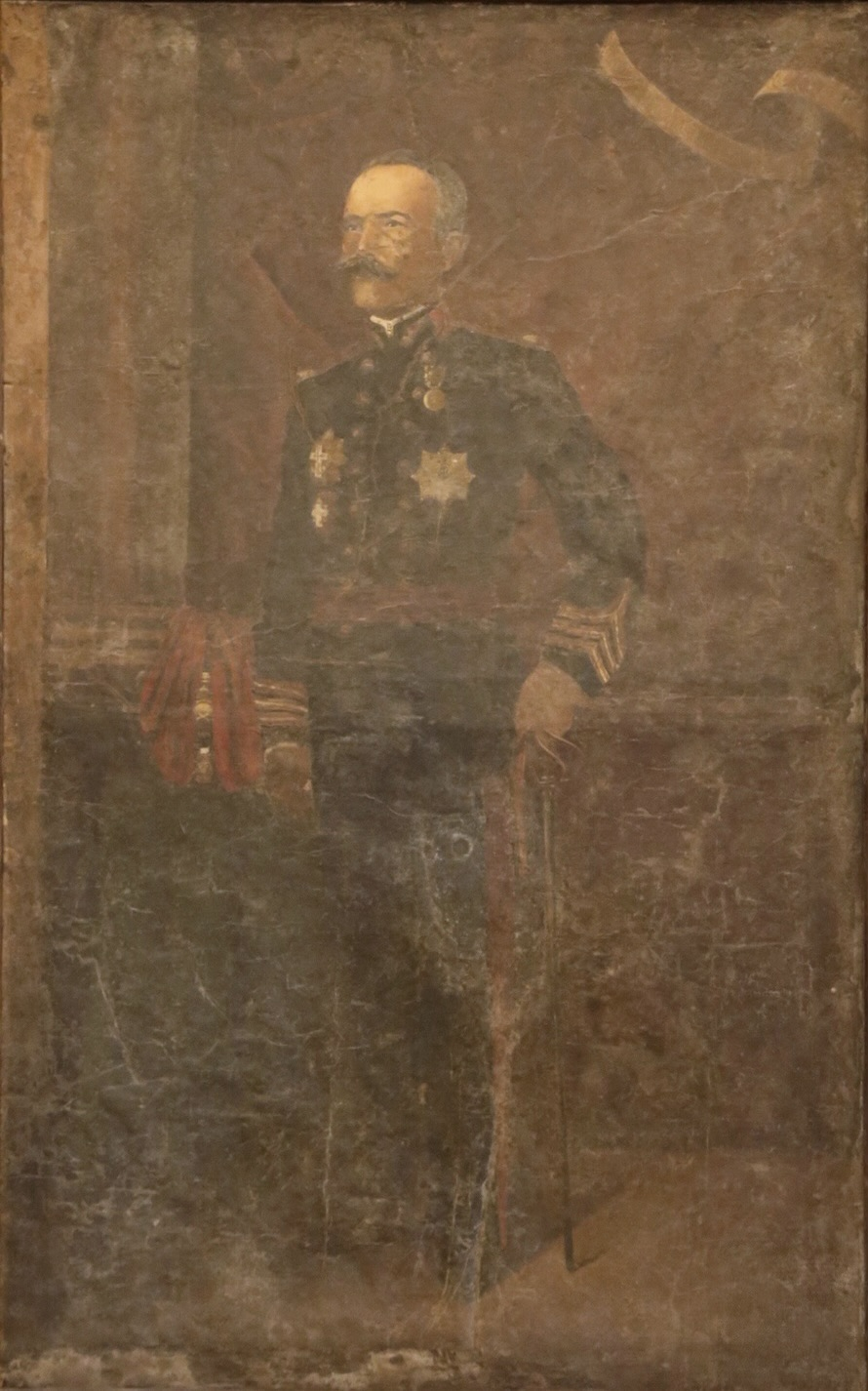

Colonial governor of Cape Verde
- In office June 1900 – 1 October 1902
- Preceded by: João Cesário de Lacerda
- Succeeded by: Francisco de Paula Cid

Colonial governor of Macau
- In office 17 December 1902 – 10 December 1903
- Preceded by: José Maria de Sousa Horta e Costa
- Succeeded by: Council of Government

Colonial governor of Portuguese India
- In office 8 November 1905 – 14 February 1907
- Preceded by: Eduardo Augusto Rodrigues Galhardo
- Succeeded by: José Maria de Sousa Horta e Costa

Personal details
- Born: 11 June 1847 Vitória, Porto, Portugal
- Died: 1917 (aged 69–70) Portugal

Arnaldo Nogueira de Novais Guedes Rebelo (11 June 1847 – 1917) was a Portuguese colonial administrator and military officer. He was born on 11 June 1847 in Vitória, a parish of Porto.

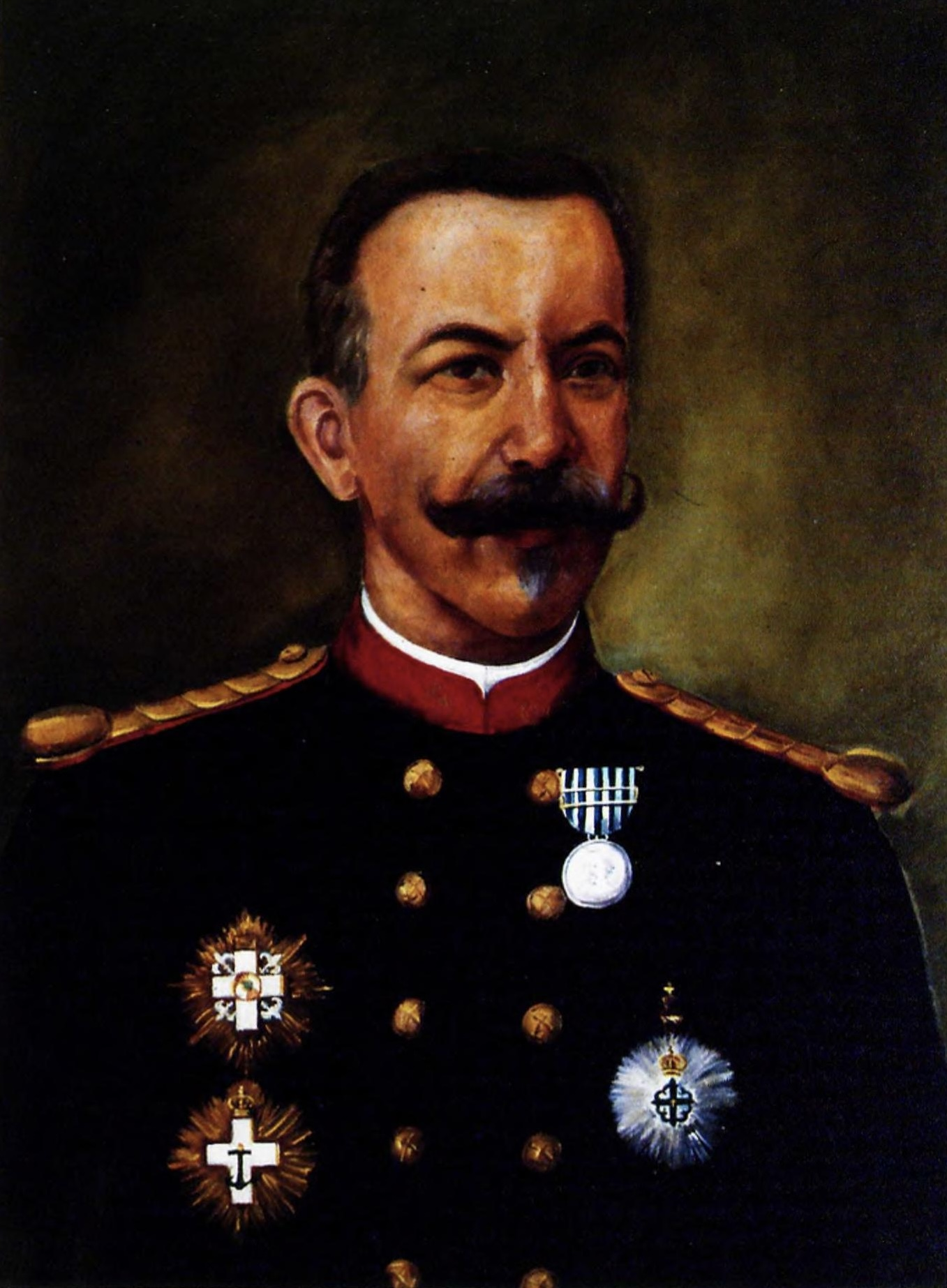
Arnaldo de Novais Guedes Rebelo while Governor of Macau

He was governor of Cape Verde between June 1900 and 1 October 1902, governor of Macau between 17 December 1902 and December 1903 and governor of Portuguese India from 8 November 1905 until 14 February 1907. He was appointed brigadier general in 1910.

== See also ==
- List of colonial governors of Cape Verde
- List of governors of Macau
- List of governors of Portuguese India

Preceded by João Cesário de Lacerda	Colonial governor of Cape Verde; 1901-1902	Succeeded by Francisco de Paula Cid
Preceded by José Maria de Sousa Horta e Costa	Colonial governor of Macau; 1902-1903	Succeeded by Council of Government
Preceded by Eduardo Augusto Rodrigues Galhardo	Colonial governor of Portuguese India; 1905-1907	Succeeded by José Maria de Sousa Horta e Costa
