= Francisco Xavier de Mendonça Corte-Real =

Portuguese naval officer, traveler, and colonial administrator (1710–1789)

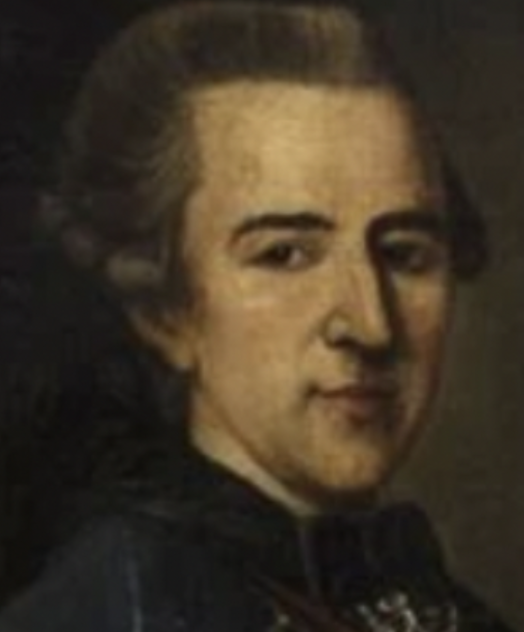
- Oil painting thought to depict Corte-Real

57th Governor of Macau
- In office July 21, 1788 – July 18, 1789
- Preceded by: Bernardo Aleixo de Lemos e Faria
- Succeeded by: Lázaro da Silva Ferreira and Manuel António Costa Ferreira (co-serving)

Member of the Goa Municipal Council
- In office 1739

Personal details
- Born: c. 1710; Goa, Portuguese India
- Died: July 16, 1789 (aged 78–79); Portuguese Macau

Military service
- Allegiance: Portugal
- Branch/service: Portuguese Navy
- Rank: Naval Captain

Francisco Xavier de Mendonça Corte-Real (c. 1710 – July 16, 1789) was a Portuguese naval officer, traveler, and colonial administrator, serving as the Governor of Macau from 1788 to 1789. Born into nobility in Goa, he joined the Portuguese Navy in his youth, eventually holding prominent positions in colonial leadership towards the latter part of his life.

== Background ==
Corte-Real was born in Goa, Portuguese India (present-day India), around 1710 into a noble family. His father's name was António; Antònio, a Catholic priest as well as a military officer, was the son of Diogo de Mendonça Corte-Real, Portugal's former Secretary of State. On the other hand, Francisco's mother was said to have been part native Goan, in addition to her Portuguese ancestry.

== Colonial affairs ==
=== Goa ===
==== Conspiracy of the Pintos ====
In about 1787, Corte-Real was ordered to arrest Father José Antonio Gonçalves or José Felippe Gonçalves, residents of the parish of Piedade, for the crime of lesa-majestade (treason). The accused were believed to be the leaders of a planned insurrection.

=== Macau ===
On July 21, 1788, he was appointed Governor of Macau. At this point in time, Corte-Real was familiar with the place, having previously served as Infantry Captain in the Guia Fortress. His passage there was rough, and he, alongside his family, survived a shipwreck, boarding a nearby English vessel.

During his term, he lost all of his possessions, incurring a debt to the Senate. Consequently, his wife and children returned to Goa in 1789, although Corte-Real himself would stay.

== Personal life ==
He was married and had children, as mentioned earlier.

He died on July 16, 1789, in Macau—a surgeon had confirmed his death, determining that the cause of it was from a long-standing ailment he had been suffering from for quite some time.
