= List of colonial governors of Angola =

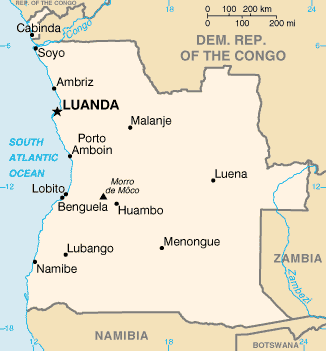
Map of Angola.

Coat of arms of Portuguese Angola

This is a list of European (Portuguese and Dutch) colonial administrators responsible for the territory of Portuguese Angola, an area equivalent to modern-day Republic of Angola.

== List ==
(Dates in italics indicate de facto continuation of office)

Tenure	Portrait	Incumbent	Notes
Portuguese suzerainty
Angola Donatária (São Paulo de Loanda)	Colony		
1 February 1575 to 1589		Paulo Dias de Novais, Donatário	
Portuguese West Africa	Crown Colony		
1589 to 1591		Luís Serrão, Governor	
1591 to June 1592		André Ferreira Pereira, Governor	
June 1592 to 1593		Francisco de Almeida, Governor	
1593 to 1594		Jerónimo de Almeida, Governor	
1594 to 1602		João Furtado de Mendonça, Governor	
1602 to 1603		João Rodrigues Coutinho, Governor	
1603 to 1606		Manuel Cerveira Pereira, Governor	1st term
1606 to September 1607		..., Governor	
September 1607 to 1611		Manuel Pereira Forjaz, Governor	
1611 to 1615		Bento Banha Cardoso, Governor	
1615 to 1617		Manuel Cerveira Pereira, Governor	2nd term
1617 to 1621		Luís Mendes de Vasconcellos, Governor	
1621 to 1623		João Correia de Sousa, Governor	
1623 to 1623		Pedro de Sousa Coelho, Governor	
1623 to 1624		Simão de Mascarenhas, Governor	
1624 to 4 September 1630		Fernão de Sousa, Governor	
4 September 1630 to 1635		Manuel Pereira Coutinho, Governor	
1635 to 18 October 1639		Francisco de Vasconcelos da Cunha, Governor	
18 October 1639 to 1641		Pedro César de Meneses, Governor	
1641 to October 1645		Pedro César de Meneses, Governor	In opposition to the Dutch
October 1645 to 1646		Francisco de Souto-Maior, Governor	In opposition to the Dutch
Dutch suzerainty (Dutch Loango-Angola)
Dutch West Africa
1641 to 1642		Pieter Moorthamer, Director	
1642 to 1648		Cornelis Hendrikszoon Ouman, Director	
Portuguese suzerainty
1646 to 24 August 1648	Triumvirate Junta		
24 August 1648 to 1651		Salvador Correia de Sá e Benavides, Governor	Commander of the Recapture of Angola
1651 to March 1652		..., acting Governor	
March 1652 to 1653		Rodrigo de Miranda Henriques, Governor	
1653 to October 1654		Bartolomeu de Vasconcelos da Cunha, acting Governor	
October 1654 to 18 April 1658		Luís Mendes de Sousa Chichorro, Governor	
18 April 1658 to 1661		João Fernandes Vieira, Governor	
1661 to September 1666		André Vidal de Negreiros, Governor	
September 1666 to February 1667		Tristão da Cunha, Governor	
February 1667 to August 1669	Junta		
August 1669 to 1676		Francisco de Távora, Governor	
1676 to 1680		Pires de Saldanha de Sousa e Meneses, Governor	
1680 to 1684		João da Silva e Sousa, Governor	
1684 to 1688		Luís Lobo da Silva, Governor	
1688 to 1691		João de Lencastre, Governor	
1691 to 1694		Gonçalo da Costa de Alcáçova Carneiro de Meneses, Governor	
1694 to 1697		Henrique Jacques de Magalhães, Governor	
1697/1698 to 1701		Luís César de Meneses, Governor	
1701 to 1702		Bernardino de Távora de Sousa Tavares, Governor	
1705 to 1709		Lourenço de Almada, Governor	
1709 to 1713		António de Saldanha de Albuquerque Castro e Ribafria, Governor	
1713 to 1717		João Manuel de Noronha, Governor	
1717 to 1722		Henrique de Figueiredo e Alarcão, Governor	
1722 to 1725		António de Albuquerque Coelho de Carvalho, Governor	
1725 to 1726		José Carvalho da Costa, acting Governor	
1726 to 1732		Paulo Caetano de Albuquerque, Governor	
1732 to 1738		Rodrigo César de Meneses, Governor	
1738 to 1748		João Joaquim Jacques de Magalhães, Governor	
1748 to 1749		Fonseca Coutinho, acting Governor	
1749 to 1753		António de Almeida Portugal, 4th Count of Avintes, 1st Marquis of Lavradio, Governor	
1753 to 1758		António Álvares da Cunha, Governor	
1758 to 1764		António de Vasconcelos, Governor	
1764 to 1772		Francisco Inocéncio de Sousa Coutinho, Governor	
1772 to 1779		António de Lencastre, Governor	
1779 to 1782		José Gonçalo da Gama, Governor or João de Camâra, Governor	
1782 to 1784	Juntas		
1784 to 1790		José José de Almeida e Vasconcellos de Soveral e Carvalho, 1st Baron of Moçâmedes, Governor	
1790 to 1797		Manuel de Almeida e Vasconcelos de Soveral e Carvalho da Maia Soares de Albergaria, 1st Count of a Lapa, Governor	
1797 to 1802		Miguel António de Melo, Governor	
1802 to 1806		Fernando António de Noronha, Governor	
1806 to 1807		..., Governor	
1807 to 1810		António de Saldanha da Gama, Governor	
1810 to 1815		José de Oliveira Barbosa, Governor	
1816 to 1819		Luís da Mota Fêo e Torres, Governor	
1819 to 1821		Manuel Vieira Tovar de Albuquerque, Governor	
1821 to 1822		Joaquim Inácio de Lima, Governor	
1822 to 1823	Junta		
1823 to 1823		Cristóvão Avelino Dias, Governor	
1823 to 1829		Nicolau de Abreu Castelo-Branco, Governor	
1829 to 1834		José Maria de Sousa Macedo Almeida e Vasconcelos, 1st Baron of Santa Comba Dão, Governor	
1834 to 1836	Junta		
1836 to 1836		Domingos Saldanha de Oliveira Daun, Governor	
1837 to 1839		Bernardo Vidal, Governor-General	
1839 to 1839		António Manuel de Noronha, Governor-General	
1839 to 1842		Manuel Eleutério Malheiro, acting Governor-General	
1842 to 1843		José Xavier Bressane Leite, Governor-General	
1843 to 1845		Lorenço Germack Possolo, Governor-General	
1845 to 1848		Pedro Alexandrino da Cunha, Governor-General	
1848 to 1851		Adrião da Silveira Pinto, Governor-General	
1851 to 1853		António Sérgio de Sousa, Governor-General	
1853 to 1853		António Ricardo Graça, Governor-General	
1853 to 1854		Miguel Ximenez Rodrigues Sandoval de Castro e Vargas, 1st Viscount of Pinheiro, Governor-General	
1854 to 1860		José Rodrigues Coelho do Amaral, Governor-General	1st term
1860 to 1861		Carlos Augusto Franco, Governor-General	
1861 to 1862		Sebastião Lopes de Calheiros e Meneses, Governor-General	
1862 to 1865		José Baptista de Andrade, Governor-General	1st term
1865 to 1868		Francisco António Gonçalves Cardoso, Governor-General	
1868 to 1869		..., Governor-General	
1869 to 1870		José Rodrigues Coelho do Amaral, Governor-General	2nd term
1870 to 1873		José Maria da Ponte e Horta, Governor-General	
1873 to 1876		José Baptista de Andrade, Governor-General	2nd term
1876 to 1878		Caetano Alexandre de Almeida e Albuquerque, Governor-General	
1878 to 1880		Vasco Guedes de Carvalho e Meneses, Governor-General	
1880 to 1882		António Eleutério Dantas, Governor-General	
1882 to 14 February 1885		Francisco Joaquim Ferreira do Amaral, Governor-General	
Portuguese West Africa Colony
14 February 1885 to 1886		Francisco Joaquim Ferreira do Amaral, Governor-General	
1886 to 1892		Guilherme Augusto de Brito Capelo, Governor-General	1st term
25 August 1892 to September 1893		Jaime Lobo de Brito Godins, acting Governor-General	
1893 to 1896		Álvaro Ferreira, Governor-General	
1896 to 1897		Gilherme Auguste de Brito Capelo, Governor-General	2nd term
1897 to 1900		António Duarte Ramada Curto, Governor-General	1st term
1900 to 1903		Francisco Xavier Cabral de Oliveira Moncada, Governor-General	
1903 to 1904		Eduardo Augusto Ferreira da Costa, Governor-General	1st term
1904 to 1904		Custódio Miguel de Borja, Governor-General	
1904 to 1905		António Duarte Ramada Curto, acting Governor-General	2nd term
1905 to 1906		Caminho de Ferro de Mossámedes, Governor-General	
1906 to 1907		Eduardo Augusto Ferreira da Costa, Governor-General	2nd term
June 1907 to June 1909		Henrique Mitchell de Paiva Cabral Couceiro, Governor-General	
1909 to 1909		Álvaro António da Costa Ferreira, acting Governor-General	
1909 to 1910		José Augusto Alves Roçadas, Governor-General	
1910 to 1911		Caetano Francisco Cláudio Eugénio Gonçalves, acting Governor-General	
1911 to 1912		Manuel Maria Coelho, Governor-General	
1912 to 15 August 1914		José Mendes Ribeiro Norton de Matos, Governor-General	
Angola Colony
15 August 1914 to 1915		José Mendes Ribeiro Norton de Matos, Governor-General	
1915 to 1916		António Júlio da Costa Pereira de Eça, Governor-General	
1916 to 1917		Pedro Francisco Massano de Amorim, Governor-General	
1917 to 1918		Jaime Alberto de Castro Morais, Governor-General	
1918 to 1919		Filomeno da Câmara Melo Cabral, Governor-General	
1919 to 1920		Mimoso Guerra, acting Governor-General	
1920 to 1921		Francisco Coelho do Amaral Reis, 1st Viscount of Pedralva, Governor-General	
1921 to 1924		José Mendes Ribeiro Norton de Matos, High Commissioner and Governor-General	
1924 to 1924		João Augusto Crispiniano Soares, High Commissioner and Governor-General	
1924 to 1926		Francisco Cunha Rêgo Chaves, High Commissioner and Governor-General	
1926 to 1928		António Vicente Ferreira, High Commissioner and Governor-General	
1928 to 1929		António Damas Mora, acting High Commissioner and Governor-General	
1929 to 1931		Filomeno da Câmara Melo Cabral, High Commissioner and Governor-General	
1931 to 1933		José Dionisio Carneiro de Sousa e Faro, High Commissioner and Governor-General	
1933 to 1934		Eduardo Ferreira Viana, High Commissioner and Governor-General	
1934 to 1935		Júlio Garcês de Lencastre, High Commissioner and Governor-General	
1936 to 1940		António Lopes Mateus, High Commissioner and Governor-General	
1940 to 1942		Manuel da Cunha e Costa Marques Mano, High Commissioner and Governor-General	
1942 to 1942		Abel de Abreu Souto-Maior, High Commissioner and Governor-General	
1942 to 1943		Álvaro de Freitas Morna, High Commissioner and Governor-General	
1943 to 1943		Manuel Pereira Figueira, High Commissioner and Governor-General	
1943 to 1947		Vasco Lopes Alves, High Commissioner and Governor-General	
1947 to 1947		Fernando Mena, High Commissioner and Governor-General	
1948 to 11 June 1951		José Agapito de Silva Carvalho, High Commissioner and Governor-General	
Angola Overseas Province of Portugal
11 June 1951 to 1955		José Agapito de Silva Carvalho, High Commissioner and Governor-General	
1955 to 1956		Manuel de Gusmão Mascarenhas Gaivão, High Commissioner and Governor-General	
1957 to 15 January 1960		Horácio José de Sá Viana Rebelo, High Commissioner and Governor-General	
15 January 1960 to 23 June 1961		Álvaro Rodrigues da Silva Tavares, High Commissioner and Governor-General	
23 June 1961 to 26 September 1962		Venâncio Augusto Deslandes, High Commissioner and Governor-General	
26 September 1962 to 27 October 1966		Silvino Silvério Marques, High Commissioner and Governor-General	1st term
27 October 1966 to October 1972		Camilo Augusto de Miranda Rebocho Vaz, High Commissioner and Governor-General	
October 1972 to May 1974		Fernando Augusto Santos e Castro, High Commissioner and Governor-General	
May 1974 to 15 June 1974		Joaquim Franco Pinheiro, acting High Commissioner and Governor-General	
15 June 1974 to 24 July 1974		Silvino Silvério Marques, High Commissioner and Governor-General	2nd term
24 July 1974 to 29 November 1974		António Alva Rosa Coutinho, acting High Commissioner and Governor-General	
29 November 1974 to 28 January 1975		António Alva Rosa Coutinho, High Commissioner and Governor-General	
28 January 1975 to 2 August 1975		António Silva Cardoso, High Commissioner and Governor-General	
2 August 1975 to 26 August 1975		Ernesto Ferreira de Macedo, acting High Commissioner and Governor-General	
26 August 1975 to 10 November 1975		Leonel Cardoso, High Commissioner and Governor-General	
10/11 November 1975	Independence as People's Republic of Angola		

For continuation after independence, see: List of presidents of Angola

== See also ==
- Colonial history of Angola

== Sources ==
- http://www.rulers.org/rula2.html#angola
- https://www.worldstatesmen.org/Angola.html
- African States and Rulers, John Stewart, McFarland
- Guinness Book of Kings, Rulers & Statesmen, Clive Carpenter, Guinness Superlatives Ltd
- Heads of State and Government, 2nd Edition, John V da Graca, MacMillan Press 2000
