= Adrião Acácio da Silveira Pinto =

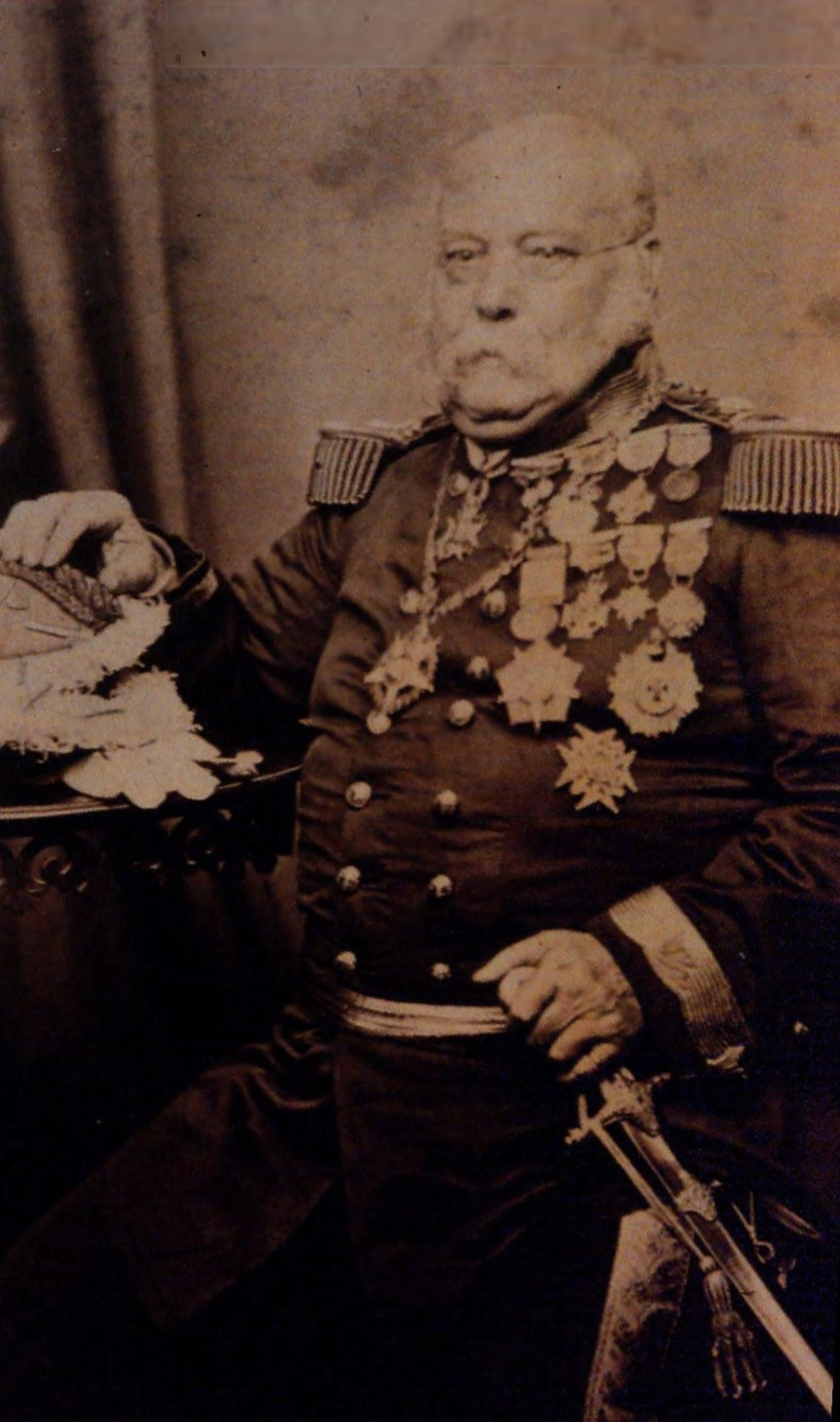

Governor of Macau
- In office 22 February 1837 – 3 October 1843
- Preceded by: Bernardo José de Sousa Soares Andrea
- Succeeded by: José Gregório Pegado

Governor of Angola
- In office 1848–1851
- Preceded by: Pedro Alexandrino da Cunha
- Succeeded by: António Sérgio de Sousa

Personal details
- Died: 1868

Chinese name
- Traditional Chinese: 邊度
- Simplified Chinese: 边度
Transcriptions
Standard Mandarin
- Hanyu Pinyin: Biān Dù
Yue: Cantonese
- Jyutping: bin1 dou6

Adrião Acácio da Silveira Pinto (born late 18th century – died 1868) served as a staff officer (Captain, later Lieutenant-General) during Liberal Wars in the Duke of Terceira's army which landed in the Algarve and marched north to Lisbon in 1833. Later he was appointed to be a Portuguese colonial administrator who held the position of Governor of Macau between 1837 and 1843. During the Opium Wars, fearing Chinese reprisals he requested the British community to leave Macau. The British sailed off to Hong Kong in August 1839. Later he was Governor-General of the Province of Angola between 1848 and 1851. As a governor of Angola, Pinto acknowledged that enslaved individuals, particularly Black Africans, had a natural inclination to escape slavery, and this was partly attributed to slave owners using them as itinerant traders in the interior regions (sertões) of Angola, which provided ample opportunities for escape.

== See also ==
- List of colonial governors of Angola
- History of Angola

Political offices
Preceded by Bernardo José de Sousa Soares Andrea	Governor of Macau; 1837–1843	Succeeded by José Gregório Pegado
Preceded by Pedro Alexandrino da Cunha	Governor of Angola; 1848–1851	Succeeded by António Sérgio de Sousa
