= Pedro Correia de Barros =

Portuguese navy officer and colonial administrator

Pedro Correia de Barros ComA GOI
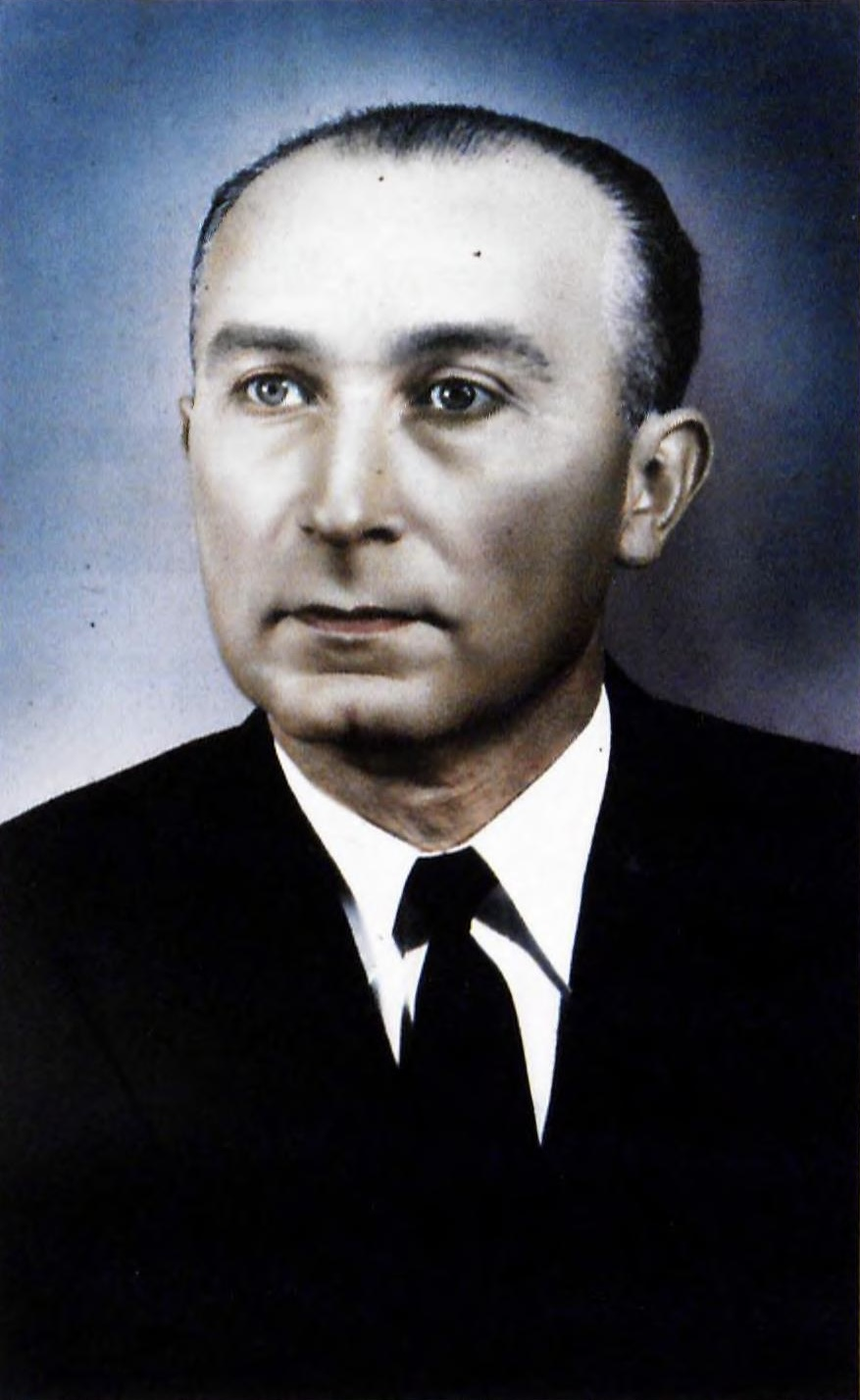

Governor of Macau
- In office 8 March 1957 – 18 September 1959
- President: Francisco Craveiro Lopes; Américo Tomás
- Prime Minister: António de Oliveira Salazar
- Preceded by: Joaquim Marques Esparteiro
- Succeeded by: Jaime Silvério Marques

Governor-general of Mozambique
- In office 1958–1961
- Preceded by: Gabriel Maurício Teixeira
- Succeeded by: Manuel Sarmento Rodrigues

Personal details
- Born: 20 June 1911 Loulé, Portugal
- Died: 2 February 1968 (aged 56) Lisbon, Portugal

Chinese name
- Traditional Chinese: 白覺理
- Simplified Chinese: 白觉理
Transcriptions
Standard Mandarin
- Hanyu Pinyin: Bái Juélǐ
Yue: Cantonese
- Jyutping: baak6 gok3 lei5

Pedro Correia de Barros (20 June 1911 – 2 February 1968) was a Portuguese navy officer and colonial administrator.

== Biography ==
Barros was born in Loulé. He graduated from the Naval School in 1932. He also had taken the courses of seaplane military observer pilot (1937) and the general naval war course (1949). On 8 March 1957, Barros was appointed the Governor of Macau, replacing Joaquim Marques Esparteiro. He left office on 18 September 1959. He served as High Commissioner and Governor-General of Mozambique between 1958 and 1961.

In December 1966, political demonstrations and rioting against Portuguese rule in Macau occurred, which was known as the 12-3 incident. As a former governor, Barros was sent to investigate the present situation of Macau. He requested negotiations, but was rejected by the Guangdong government.

== Honours ==
- Commander of Military Order of Aviz (27 September 1954)
- Grand-officer of Order of the Colonial Empire (2 September 1961)
- Officier of Order of the Black Star (France, 8 January 1954)
- Grand-officer of Order of the Star of Grand Comoro (Morocco, 5 June 1956)
- 3rd Class Cross of Order of Naval Merit (Spain, 20 August 1965)

Political offices
Preceded by Joaquim Marques Esparteiro	Governor of Macau; 1957–1959	Succeeded by Jaime Silvério Marques
Preceded by Gabriel Maurício Teixeira	Governor-general of Mozambique; 1958–1961	Succeeded by Manuel Maria Sarmento Rodrigues
