= Joaquim Marques Esparteiro =

Portuguese writer (1985-1976)

Joaquim Marques Esparteiro OA GOA GCA MOSD MPMM ComSE MOCE ComIP
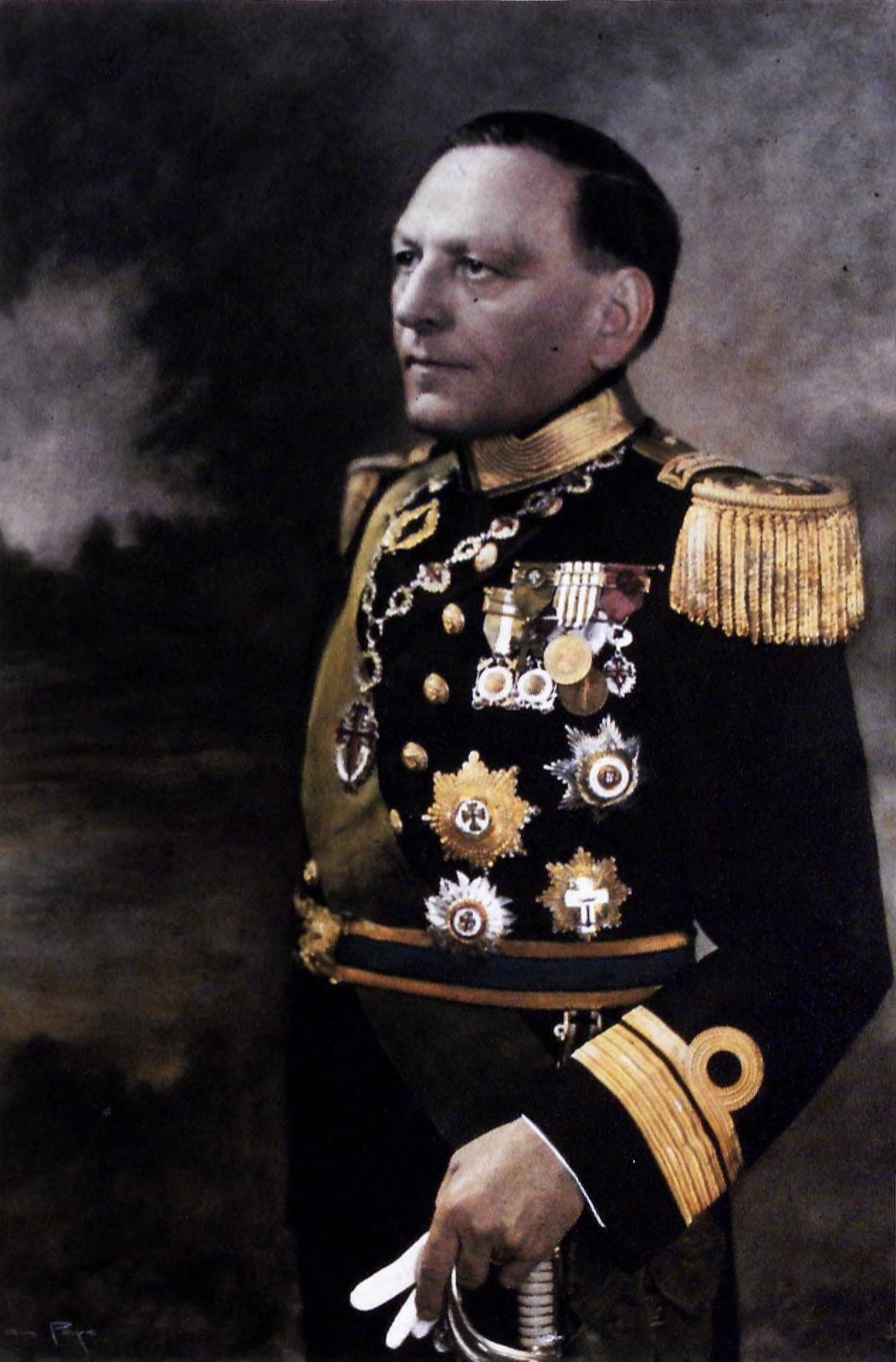

Governor of Macau
- In office 13 November 1951 – 8 March 1957
- Preceded by: Albano Rodrigues de Oliveira
- Succeeded by: Pedro Correia de Barros

Personal details
- Born: 28 January 1895 Abrantes, Portugal
- Died: 1976 (aged 80–81) Lisbon, Portugal

Chinese name
- Chinese: 史伯泰
Transcriptions
Standard Mandarin
- Hanyu Pinyin: Shǐ Bótài
Yue: Cantonese
- Jyutping: si2 baak3 taai3

Joaquim Marques Esparteiro (28 January 1895 – 1976) was a Portuguese navy officer and colonial administrator.

== Biography ==
Esparteiro was born in Abrantes on 28 January 1895. He attended the course of Naval School with a specialization in Artillery, then he graduated from University of Coimbra or University of Lisbon with a licentiate. He was also a professor of Ballistics, Calculation, Mechanics and the Artillery Specialization Course for Officers at Naval School.

On 13 November 1951, Esparteiro was appointed the Governor of Macau, replacing Albano Rodrigues de Oliveira. During his tenure, the tension between Macau and Communist China was palpable. In July 1952, a major border incident happened at Portas do Cerco with Portuguese African troops exchanging fire with Chinese Communist border guards. According to a telegram by Esparteiro to then-Overseas Minister Sarmento Rodrigues, local Chinese businessmen like Dr. O Lon and Ma Man-kei opposed the Guangdong government's aggressive response to Portugal's possible embargo against China. In 1955, the Chinese government, suggested by Zhou Enlai and with the mediation of then-Hong Kong Governor Alexander Grantham, forced Macau to cancel the 400 year celebration of foundation. He left office as governor on 8 March 1957.

In Taipa, Admiral Marques Esparteiro Road (Estrada Almirante Marques Esparteiro, 史伯泰海軍將軍馬路) was named after him.

== Publications ==
- Arte de Marinheiro (1924, Macau);
- Lições de Química Aplicada, Explosivos e Balística Interna (1927, Lisbon);
- A few critical observations on Ballistic Experiments (conferência) (1933, publicada nas Transactions of Barrow-and-Furness Engineers Association);
- Manual de Munições (publicação oficial do Ministério da Marinha (1934, London);
- Resolução de Triângulos Esféricos (1936, Lisbon);
- Trigonometria Esférica com aplicações à Geodesia, Astronomia e Navegação (1941, Lisbon);
- Guia de Balística Interna, de colaboração com o Primeiro-Tenente Ramalho Rosa (1942, Lisbon).

Political offices
Preceded by Albano Rodrigues de Oliveira	Governor of Macau; 1951–1957	Succeeded by Pedro Correia de Barros
