= José Manuel de Sousa e Faro Nobre de Carvalho =

Portuguese army brigadier-general and colonial administrator

José Manuel de Sousa e Faro Nobre de Carvalho OA ComA GOA
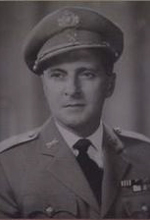

121st Governor of Macau
- In office 25 November 1966 – 19 November 1974
- President: Américo Tomás; António de Spínola; Francisco da Costa Gomes
- Prime Minister: António de Oliveira Salazar; Marcelo Caetano; Adelino da Palma Carlos; Vasco dos Santos Gonçalves
- Preceded by: António Lopes dos Santos
- Succeeded by: José Eduardo Martinho Garcia Leandro

Personal details
- Born: 5 September 1910 Lisbon, Portugal
- Died: 23 August 1988 (aged 77) Lisbon, Portugal

Chinese name
- Traditional Chinese: 嘉樂庇
- Simplified Chinese: 嘉乐庇
Transcriptions
Standard Mandarin
- Hanyu Pinyin: Jiā Lèbì
Yue: Cantonese
- Jyutping: gaa1 lok6 bei3

José Manuel de Sousa e Faro Nobre de Carvalho (5 September 1910 – 23 August 1988) was a Portuguese army brigadier-general and colonial administrator. He served as the 121st Governor of Macau from 1966 to 1974.

== Biography ==
Nobre de Carvalho was born in Lisbon in 1910. He was mobilized for various service commissions in India, Cape Verde and Angola, where he served as Chief of Staff of the Governor General, and later, General Commander of the Public Security Police.

On 25 November 1966, he was appointed the Governor of Macau, replacing António Lopes dos Santos. In the same year, political demonstrations and rioting against Portuguese rule in Macau occurred, which was known as the 12-3 incident. On 29 January 1967, he signed a statement of apology under a portrait of Mao Zedong, placing Macau under the de facto control of the People's Republic of China.

He attached importance to the development of Macau's industry, promoting a new policy based on industry as a basis for economic development. He also promoted the construction of a bridge connecting Macau Peninsula and Taipa. The bridge was completed on 5 October 1974 and named after him.

He left office as governor on 19 November 1974. He died on 23 August 1988 in Lisbon at the age of 77.

== Honours ==
- Officer of Military Order of Aviz (8 June 1948)
- Commander of Military Order of Aviz (8 March 1961)
- Grand Officer of Military Order of Aviz (23 October 1967)

Political offices
Preceded by António Lopes dos Santos	Governor of Macau; 1966–1974	Succeeded by José Eduardo Martinho Garcia Leandro
