= José Rodrigues Coelho do Amaral =

Portuguese noble, colonial administrator and soldier

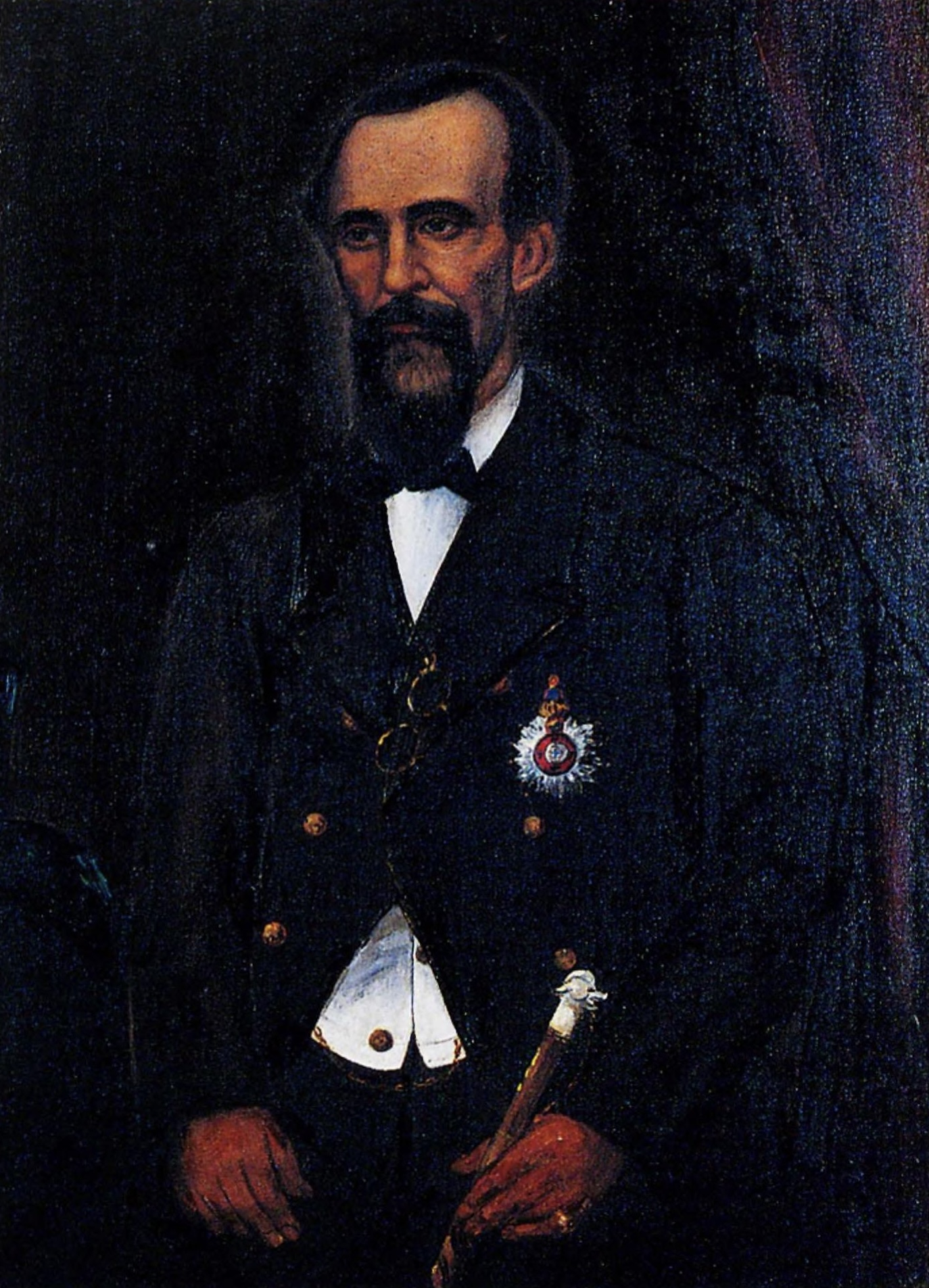

Governor of Angola
- In office 1854–1860
- Preceded by: Miguel Ximenes Gomes Rodrigues Sandoval de Castro e Viegas
- Succeeded by: Carlos Augusto Franco
- In office 1869–1870
- Preceded by: Francisco António Gonçalves Cardoso
- Succeeded by: Joaquim José da Graça

Governor of Macau
- In office 22 June 1863 – 26 October 1866
- Preceded by: Isidoro Francisco Guimarães
- Succeeded by: José Maria da Ponte e Horta

Governors-General of Mozambique
- In office August 1870 – December 1873
- Preceded by: Inácio A. Alves
- Succeeded by: José Manuel Crispiniano da Fonseca

Personal details
- Born: 15 May 1808 Lisbon, Portugal
- Died: 14 December 1873 (aged 65) Island of Mozambique, Mozambique, Portugal

Chinese name
- Chinese: 阿穆恩
Transcriptions
Standard Mandarin
- Hanyu Pinyin: Ā Mù'ēn
Yue: Cantonese
- Jyutping: aa3 muk6 jan1

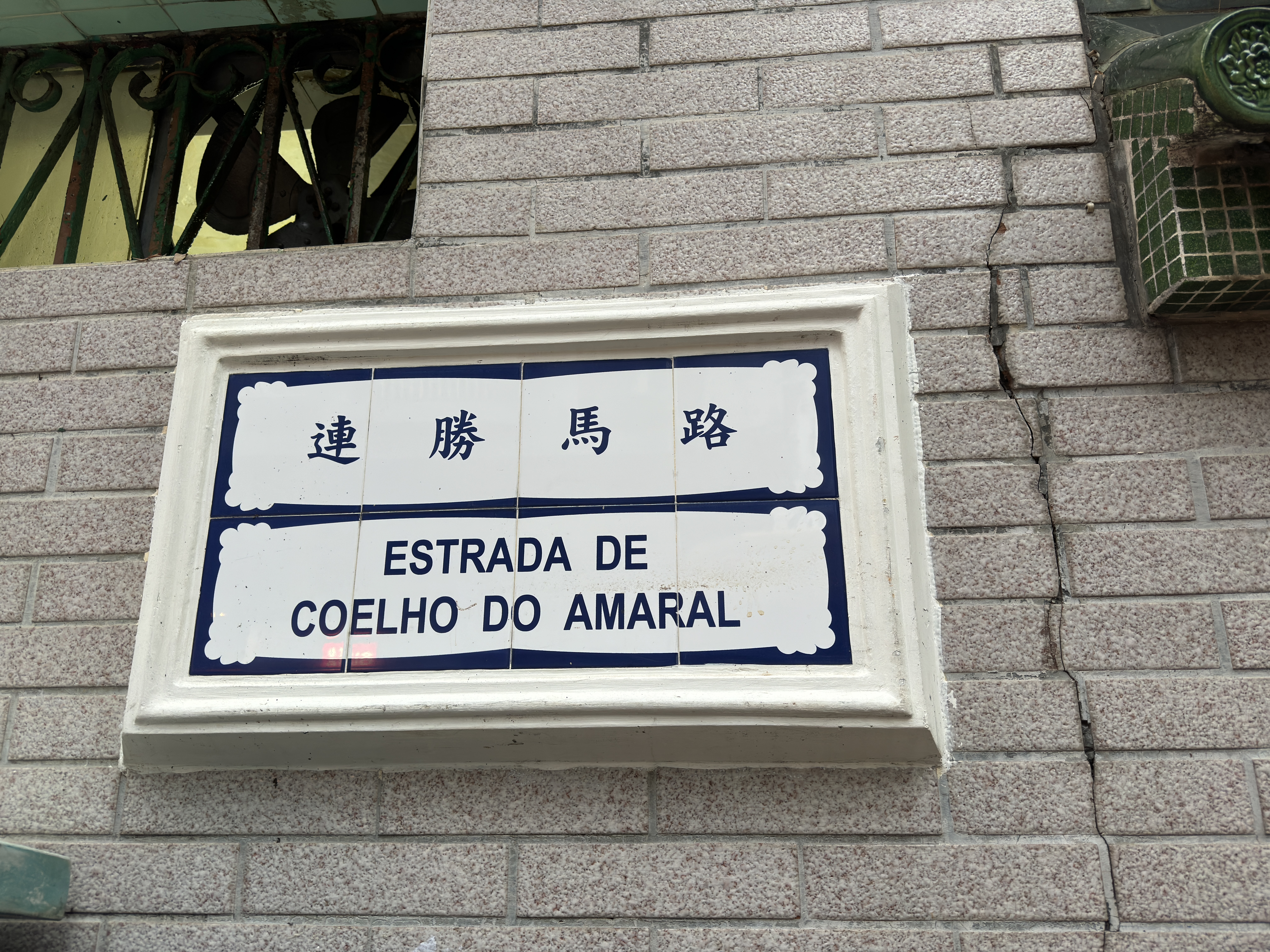
Macau street sign of Estrada de Coelho do Amaral

José Rodrigues Coelho do Amaral (15 May 1808 – 14 December 1873, Portuguese Mozambique) was a Portuguese noble who served as a colonial administrator and soldier in the Portuguese Empire. He is best known for his roles as the two time governor of Angola and the governor of Macau and governor of Mozambique. Coelho do Amaral further served Portugal as the plenipotentiary minister to China.

== Biography ==
José Rodrigues Coelho do Amaral was born to a Portuguese noble family in 1808.

At an early age he joined the military. He became a military engineer, rapidly climbing the ranks to notably become the colonel of the Corps of Engineers and then a general.

His first major posting came in 1854 when he was made the governor of Angola, a post he held until 1860.

Three years later, on 22 June 1863, he was nominated as governor of Macau, a posting that lasted until 1866. He was instrumental in shaping the modern-day city through his many works. One of his first major acts as governor was the demolition of the Convento de São Francisco, building in its place a barracks for the 1st Battalion of the Line, a project completed on 30 December 1866. He later expanded the project that would later become the Forte de São Francisco. After its destruction, the barracks was rebuilt in 1937. Near the convent there was a wooded area called Campo de S. Francisco. Coelho do Amaral turned this field into garden, closing it with a balustrade, which has long since disappeared. Ordered the construction of a road between the harbor and the Mong Ha Siege. He resumed construction of the fort at Mong Ha, built Macau's first garden promenade, and ordered the construction of the lighthouse Guide there in 1865, the first ever built in Asia. He was further instrumental in resolving health problems throughout the territory.

He was again named governor in Portuguese Angola, where he was in office from 1869 to 1870.

His last governorship was as the governor of Mozambique, a post he was in from August 1870 to his death in December 1873.

== Death and legacy ==
José Rodrigues Coelho do Amaral died in Mozambique on 14 December 1873. He was sepulchered at the Capela de Nossa Senhora do Baluarte. After his death he received various honors and awards from both the Portuguese monarchy and the Qing ruling dynasty.

In Macau, there are various streets named after Coelho do Amaral, including one of the main roads in Taipa, the Estrada Coelho do Amaral. The Taipa Museum of History contains a portrait of the governor.

Political offices
Preceded by Miguel Ximenez Rodrigues Sandoval de Castro e Vargas	Governor of Angola; 1854–1860	Succeeded by Carlos Augusto Franco
Preceded by Isidoro Francisco Guimarães	Governor of Macau; 1863–1866	Succeeded by José Maria da Ponte e Horta
Preceded by Francisco António Gonçalves Cardoso (Provisional)	Governor of Angola; 1869–1870	Succeeded by Joaquim José da Graça (Provisional); José Maria da Ponte e Horta
