= Artur Tamagnini de Sousa Barbosa =

Colonial administrator (1880–1940)

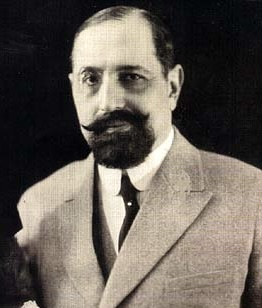

Governor of Macau
- In office 12 October 1918 – 23 August 1919
- Preceded by: Manuel Ferreira da Rocha & Agostinho Vieira de Matos
- Succeeded by: Henrique Monteiro Correia da Silva
- In office 8 December 1926 – 30 March 1931
- Preceded by: Manuel Firmino de Almeida Maia Magalhães
- Succeeded by: Joaquim Anselmo de Mata Oliveira
- In office 11 April 1937 – 29 October 1940
- Preceded by: António José Bernardes de Miranda
- Succeeded by: Gabriel Maurício Teixeira

Personal details
- Born: August 31, 1881 Lisbon, Portugal
- Died: July 10, 1940 (aged 58) Macau, Portugal

Chinese name
- Chinese: 巴波沙
Transcriptions
Standard Mandarin
- Hanyu Pinyin: Bā Bōshā
Yue: Cantonese
- Jyutping: baa1 bo1 saa1

Artur Tamagnini de Sousa Barbosa (1880 – 1940) was a Portuguese colonial administrator who three times held the post of Governor of Macao. He married poet Maria Ana Acciaioli Tamagnini and died during his third term as governor of the Portuguese colony of Macao. He began his first term in 1918.

His third term was much more difficult to perform than the other two because in the latter term he had to prepare Macau to face World War II and negotiate with the Japanese to respect the neutrality of this small Portuguese colony. This difficult work was later transferred to Gabriel Maurício Teixeira, Governor of Macao from 1940 to 1947. His collaboration is found in the Gazette of the Colonies (1924–1926).
