= Isidoro Francisco Guimarães =

Portuguese colonial administrator

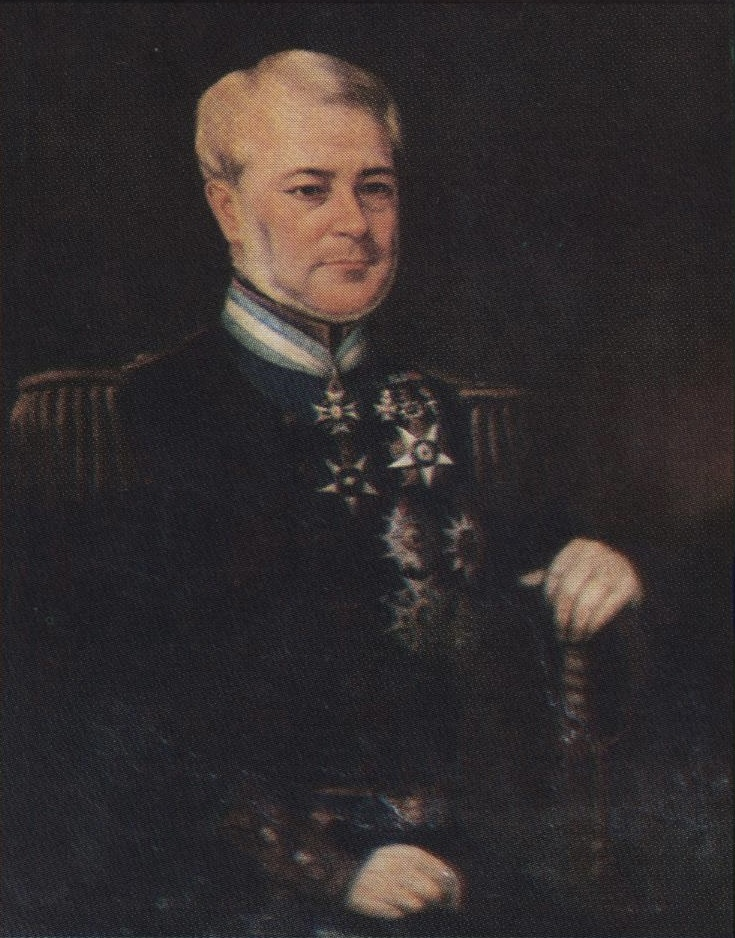

84th Governor of Macau
- In office 19 November 1851 – 22 June 1863
- Preceded by: Francisco António Gonçalves Cardoso
- Succeeded by: José Rodrigues Coelho do Amaral

Personal details
- Born: 19 April 1808 Lisbon, Portugal
- Died: 17 January 1883 (aged 74) Lisbon, Portugal

Chinese name
- Traditional Chinese: 基瑪良士
- Simplified Chinese: 基玛良士
Transcriptions
Standard Mandarin
- Hanyu Pinyin: Jīmǎliángshì
Yue: Cantonese
- Jyutping: gei1 maa5 loeng4 si6

Isidoro Francisco Guimarães, 1st viscount of Praia Grande de Macau (19 April 1808 – 17 January 1883), was a Portuguese colonial administrator who served as the governor of Macau from 1851 to 1863. During his term, the gambling business in Macau was legalized in an attempt to generate revenues for the government.

Political offices
Preceded by Francisco António Gonçalves Cardoso	Governor of Macau; 1851–1863	Succeeded by José Rodrigues Coelho do Amaral
