= Vasco de Almeida e Costa =

Portuguese naval officer and politician

135th Governor of Macau
- In office 16 June 1981 – 14 May 1986
- President: António Ramalho Eanes; Mário Soares
- Prime Minister: Francisco José Pereira Pinto Balsemão; Mário Alberto Nobre Lopes Soares; Aníbal António Cavaco Silva
- Preceded by: Nuno de Melo Egídio
- Succeeded by: Joaquim Pinto Machado

Acting Prime Minister of Portugal
- In office 23 June 1976 – 23 July 1976
- President: Francisco da Costa Gomes; António Ramalho Eanes
- Preceded by: José Pinheiro de Azevedo
- Succeeded by: Mário Soares

Minister of the Internal Administration
- In office 19 September 1975 – 22 July 1976
- Prime Minister: José Pinheiro de Azevedo
- Preceded by: Alfredo Cândido de Moura
- Succeeded by: Manuel da Costa Brás

Personal details
- Born: 24 July 1932 São Sebastião da Pedreira, Lisbon, Portugal
- Died: 26 July 2010 (aged 78) Lisbon, Portugal
- Party: Independent
- Spouse: Maria Claudiana da Costa de Faria Araújo

Chinese name
- Traditional Chinese: 高斯達
- Simplified Chinese: 高斯达
Transcriptions
Standard Mandarin
- Hanyu Pinyin: Gāo Sīdá
Yue: Cantonese
- Jyutping: gou1 si1 daat6

Vasco Fernando Leote de Almeida e Costa, GCIH, GCL (24 July 1932 – 26 July 2010) was a Portuguese naval officer and politician.

== Biography ==
He served as Minister of Internal Administration during José Pinheiro de Azevedo's government, between 19 September 1975 and 23 July 1976. He also had an important role during the Portuguese decolonization period. From 23 June 1976 he became interim Prime Minister after Pinheiro de Azevedo suffered a heart attack during his presidential campaign. He remained Prime Minister of Portugal as an interim official for the rest of Pinheiro de Azevedo's mandate, when he was substituted by the democratically elected Mário Soares. He was also the 134th Governor of Macau from 16 June 1981 to 15 May 1986. His reign in the colony was marked by considerable infrastructure development. Costa's decision to dissolve the local Legislative Assembly amid intensified power struggle with the local Macanese community was a major political crisis at that time. To balance the predominant Macanese legislature, he proposed electoral reform that empowered the Chinese business community and elites. During his tenure, Costa twice threatened to pull out of Macao unilaterally amid tense debate on the year of Handover.

He was the son of Américo de Almeida e Costa and wife Julieta da Conceição Leote and married in Viana do Castelo, Meadela, at the Chapel of São Vicente, on 11 January 1959 to Maria Claudiana da Costa de Faria Araújo (b. Viana do Castelo, Meadela, House of o Ameal, 17 May 1934), one of the fourteen children of a couple of Northern Portuguese Nobility, and by whom he had issue.

He died just after his 78th birthday.

Political offices
Preceded by José Pinheiro de Azevedo	Prime Minister of Portugal (Interim); 1976	Succeeded by Mário Soares
Preceded by Nuno de Melo Egídio	Governor of Macau; 1981–1986	Succeeded by Joaquim Pinto Machado
