= José Maria de Sousa Horta e Costa =

Portuguese soldier, politician, and diplomat

José Maria de Sousa Horta e Costa CavA, OA, OSE
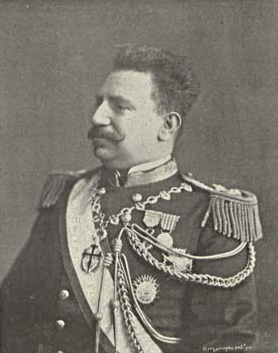

Governor of Macau
- In office 24 March 1894 – 12 May 1897
- Preceded by: Custódio Miguel de Borja
- Succeeded by: Eduardo Augusto Rodrigues Galhardo
- In office 12 August 1900 – 17 December 1902
- Preceded by: Eduardo Augusto Rodrigues Galhardo
- Succeeded by: Arnaldo de Novais Guedes Rebelo

Governor of Portuguese India
- In office 1907–1910
- Preceded by: Council of Government of the State of India
- Succeeded by: Francisco Manuel Couceiro da Costa

Personal details
- Born: 20 October 1858 Santa Comba Dão, Portugal
- Died: 21 September 1927 (aged 68) Porto, Foz do Douro, Portugal
- Occupation: Soldier, politician, diplomat

Chinese name
- Chinese: 高士德
Transcriptions
Standard Mandarin
- Hanyu Pinyin: Gāo Shìdé
Yue: Cantonese
- Jyutping: gou1 si6 dak1

José Maria de Sousa Horta e Costa, CavA, OA, OSE (20 October 1858 – 21 September 1927), also known as José Maria de Sousa Horta e Costa (de) Almeida e Vasconcelos, was a Portuguese soldier, politician, and diplomat. He was colonial Governor of Macau and India.

He was the second son of Miguel António de Sousa Horta Almeida e Vasconcelos, 2nd Baron of Santa Comba Dão and his second wife, Maria da Glória da Costa Brandão e Albuquerque, sister of the 1st Viscount of Ervedal da Beira. He was born in Santa Comba Dão and died in Porto, Foz do Douro.

== Career ==
Horta e Costa studied at the Escola do Exército and started his military career as an Alferes of engineers on 10 January 1883. He belonged to the general staff of his military branch and was promoted through lieutenant, captain, major, and lieutenant colonel, finally reaching the post of colonel of engineers. At the University of Coimbra he took a bachelor's degree in mathematics. A lieutenant already in 1886, the Minister of the Navy, Manuel Pinheiro Chagas, appointed him director of public works of Macau. Here he distinguished himself, and in 1888 he was elected deputy to the Cortes Gerais for the legislature of 1887–1889 in a supplementary election, taking his seat in 1889 already with the post of captain, in which seat he had interventions on 23 and 30 January 10 and 21 April 3 May, 6, 14 and 26 June 1889. He had a seat at the Chamber in diverse legislatures, more specifically in the ones of 1890–1892 and 1893, in which he was part of commissions twice in 1892, thrice in 1893 and thrice in 1894 and had interventions on 7 June 11, 15 and 21 July and 21 August 1890, 22 June 1891, 3 February and 19 March 1892, 10 January 22, 23 and 27 May 20, 22 and 23 June and 1, 5, 6 and 12 July 1893, always representing the circle of Macau, where he returned in 1893 as 69th governor, taking office on 24 March 1894. He resigned on 12 March/May 1897 after a ministerial change and was granted a Letter of Counsel, becoming a Member of His Most Faithful Majesty's Counsel.

He was also an envoy and a minister plenipotentiary in China, Japan, and Siam, where he met the Empress Dowager Cixi and Guangxu Emperor at the Forbidden City in Beijing; Emperor Meiji in Tokyo; and Chulalongkorn in Bangkok, who decorated him.

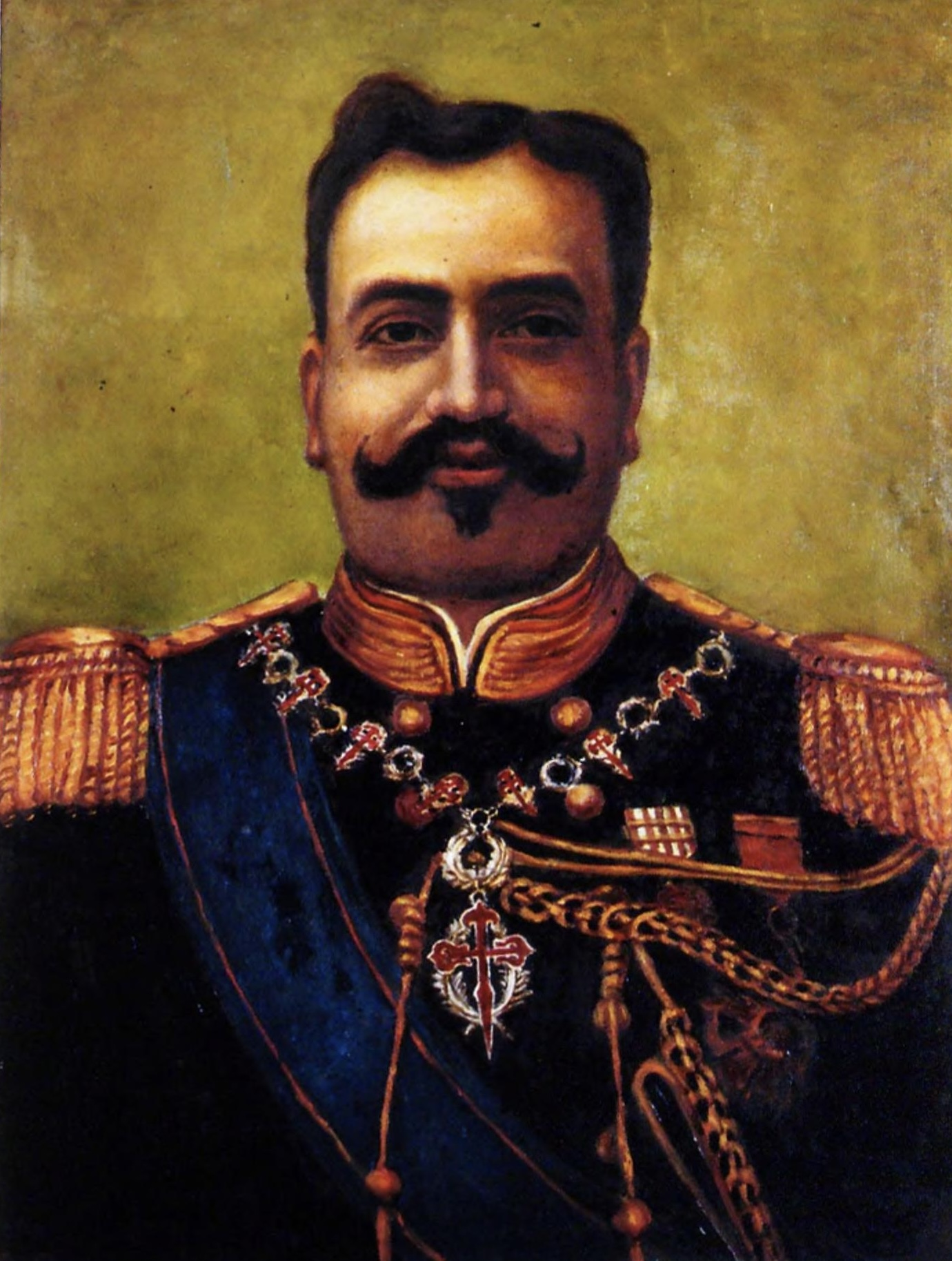
José Maria de Sousa Horta and Costa while Governor of Macau

In 1900 the Regenerator Party returned to power and the Counsilor Horta e Costa was again appointed on 12 August as the 71st Governor of Macau, where he conducted a military expedition. The mission was difficult and risky, and he received a Portary of Commendation. He then founded the Lyceum and made various improvements. He left office on 17 December 1902.

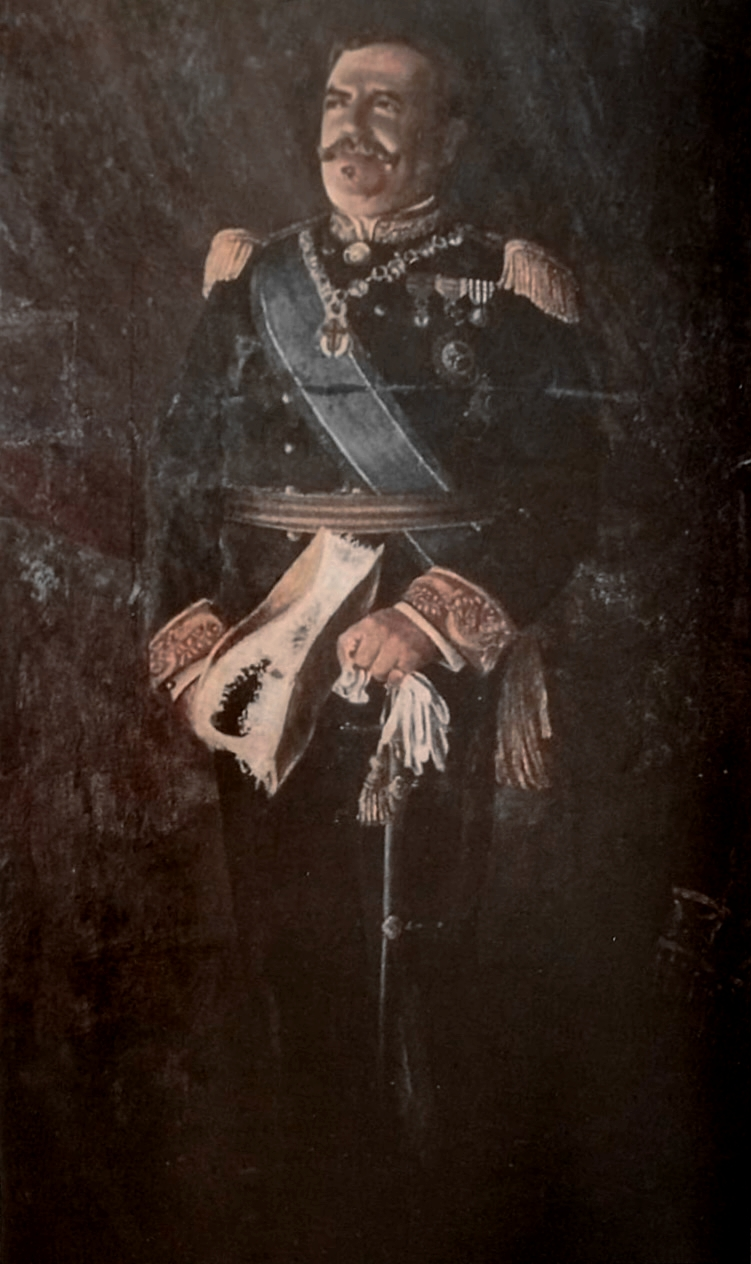
José Maria de Sousa Horta e Costa as Governor of India

On 14 February 1907, as Chief of Cabinet of the President of the Ministry of João Franco, he was appointed 113th Governor-General of India, an office he bore until the proclamation of the Portuguese Republic in 1910. In the year he took office he instaured an enquiry. His government was marked by the promulgation of various measures towards developing commerce in the province. One of the most important improvements achieved in his tenure was the building of metal bridges to improve the communication between cities in the province. Among other achievements, he regularised the water supply in Panaji city by building a special reservoir at Bainguinim with special imported materials from France. He also increased the capacity of the port at Mormugão and he was responsible for Campal Avenue, where he constructed roads with footpaths and planted trees. According to Goan historian Percival Noronha, the fact that he was an engineer by profession made a difference, and the amount of development work carried out by him in the four years of his rule was something "never done in hundreds of years".

He also had other plans which were not fulfilled during his regime. His government was marked by the Revolt of the Ranes, to which the simple arrival of a company of Landins was enough to overcome.

With the Proclamation of the Portuguese Republic he ended his term. A public political rally elected Dr. Francisco Manuel Couceiro da Costa as the new governor, as required by the provisional government. Horta e Costa embarked for his homeland without being molested and with the respect of all the population of India.

Avenida Horta e Costa, in Macau, is named after him.

== Decorations ==
- Knight Grand Cross of the Order of the Crown of Siam
- Commander of the Order of Isabella the Catholic of Spain
- Knight and Officer of the Order of Aviz
- Officer of the Order of Saint James of the Sword
- Silver Medal of Exemplary Behaviour
- Many others

== Family ==
He married Carolina Adelaide Pinheiro de Vasconcelos Silvano (18 April 1869 – Porto) on 12 April 1886, shortly before embarking to Macau, daughter of António Maria Silvano, then a Lieutenant Colonel of the Infantry Regiment of the Overseas, later Brigadier General and General of the Arm of Infantry, Knight and Officer of the Order of Aviz, Commander of the Order of Isabella the Catholic, etc., and his wife Carolina Xavier Pinheiro. They had three children:

- Miguel Silvano Horta e Costa (Lisbon, Encarnação, 21 August 1898 – Porto, Foz do Douro, 31 March 1953)
- Vera Maria Silvano Horta e Costa (Lisbon, 7 August 1904 – ?), unmarried and without issue; she lived with her brother Vasco
- Vasco Silvano Horta e Costa (Lisbon, 18 March 1905 or 20 March 1906 – Porto, 11 April 2006)

== Sources ==
- Afonso Eduardo Martins Zúquete, Tratado de Todos os Vice-Reis e Governadores da Índia, Editorial Enciclopédia, Lisboa, 1962, p. 247
- Afonso Eduardo Martins Zúquete, Nobreza de Portugal e do Brasil, Volume Terceiro, p. 289
- Albano da Silveira Pinto and Dom Augusto Romano Sanches de Baena Farinha de Almeida Portugal Silva e Sousa, 1st Viscount of Sanches de Baena, Resenha das Famílias Titulares e Grandes de Portugal, Fernando Santos e Rodrigo Faria de Castro, 2.ª Edição, Braga, 1991, p. 517
- Domingos de Araújo Affonso and Rui Dique Travassos Valdez, Livro de Oiro da Nobreza, J. A. Telles da Sylva, 2.ª edição, Lisboa, 1988, Volume III, p. 235
- António de Vasconcelos, Brás Garcia Mascarenhas, Imprensa da Universidade, Coimbra, 1921, p. 157
- Various, Anuário da Nobreza de Portugal, III, 1985, Tomo I, p. 854 and Tomo II, p. 1,048
- José Maria de Sousa Horta e Costa in a Portuguese Genealogical site

Preceded by Custódio Miguel de Borja	Colonial governor of Macau; 1894–1897	Succeeded by Eduardo Augusto Rodrigues Galhardo
Preceded by Eduardo Augusto Rodrigues Galhardo	Colonial governor of Macau; 1900–1903	Succeeded by Arnaldo de Novais Guedes Rebelo
Preceded by Council of Government of the State of India: Bernardo Nunes Garcia, César Augusto Rancon and Francisco Maria Peixoto Vieira	Colonial governor of Portuguese India; 1907-19010	Succeeded by Francisco Manuel Couceiro da Costa
