= José Maria da Ponte e Horta =

Portuguese noble, colonial administrator and soldier

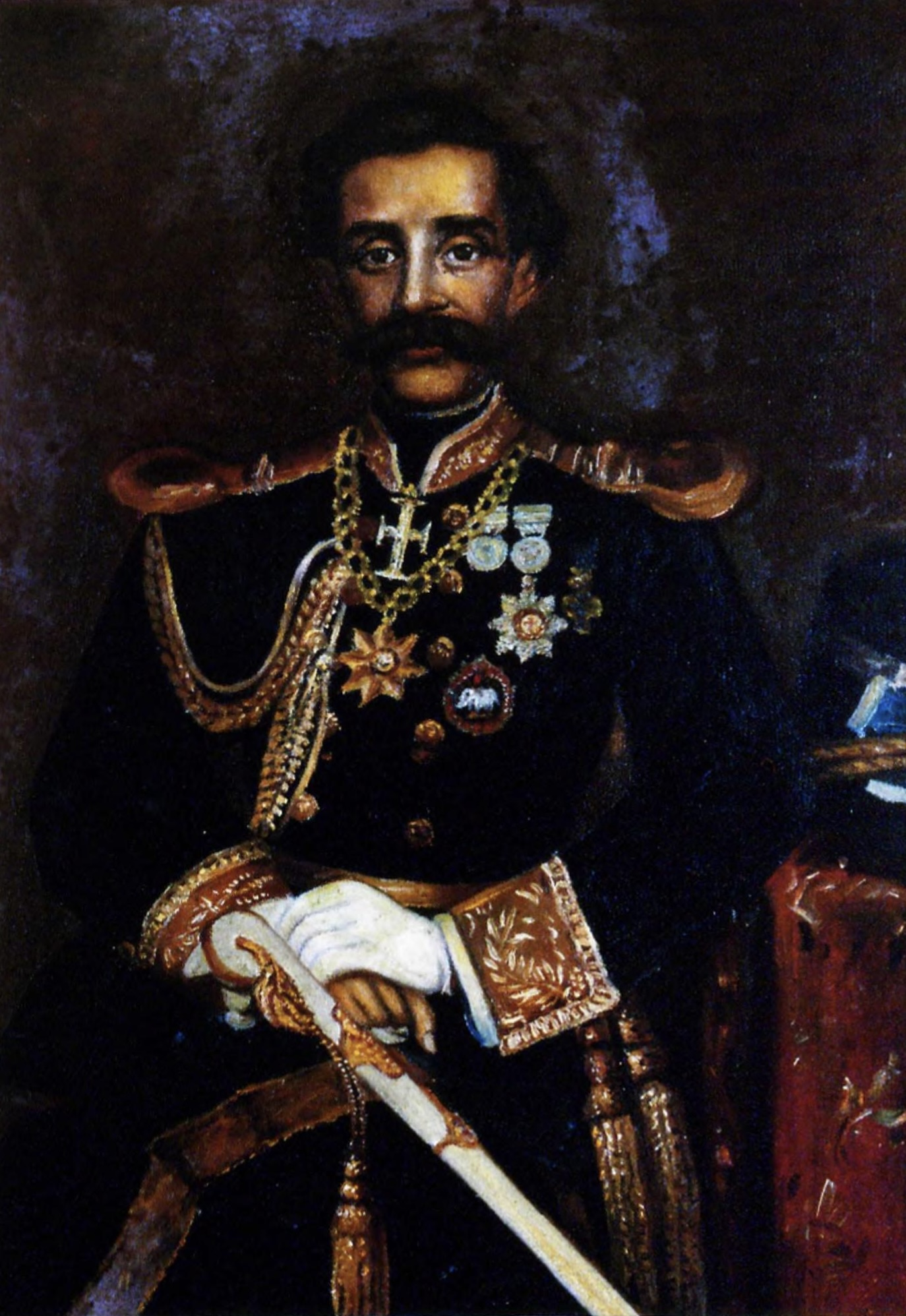

Governor-general of Angola
- In office 1870–1873
- Preceded by: Joaquim José da Graça
- Succeeded by: José Baptista de Andrade

Governor of Macau
- In office 26 October 1866 – 3 August 1868
- Preceded by: José Rodrigues Coelho do Amaral
- Succeeded by: António Sérgio de Sousa

Personal details
- Born: 1824 Faro, Portugal
- Died: 9 March 1892 (aged 67–68)

Chinese name
- Chinese: 柯邦迪
Transcriptions
Standard Mandarin
- Hanyu Pinyin: Kē Bāngdí
Yue: Cantonese
- Jyutping: o1 bong1 dik6

José Maria da Ponte e Horta (1824 in Faro – 9 March 1892) was a Portuguese noble who served as a colonial administrator and soldier in the Portuguese Empire. He is best known for his roles as the two time governor of Angola and the governor of Macau and governor of Mozambique.

== Biography ==
José Maria da Ponte e Horta was born to a Portuguese noble family in 1824.

Ponte e Horta joined the Portuguese military and later went on to serve as a professor at the Escola Politécnica de Lisboa and was named Par do Reino, one of the highest honors of Portuguese society.

On 26 October 1866, Ponte e Horta became the Portuguese governor of Macau, a position which he held for two years until 3 August 1868.

In 1870, he again held a top colonial office, being named the governor of Angola, which was at the time a Portuguese colony. He remained governor of Portuguese Angola until 1873.

Many sources state that Ponte e Horta also held the post of governor of Cabo Verde; however, he does not appear in other records as having held that position.

== Death and legacy ==
José Maria da Ponte e Horta died on 9 March 1892. There are several streets and buildings named after him in Macau.

== Published works ==
- Memória sobre os Infinitamente Pequenos.

== See also ==
- Colonial Macau
- Portuguese Angola

Preceded by José Rodrigues Coelho do Amaral	Governor of Macau; 1866–1868	Succeeded by António Sérgio de Sousa
Preceded by José Rodrigues Coelho do Amaral	Governor of Angola; 1870–1873	Succeeded by José Baptista de Andrade
