= Governor of Macau =

Head of the Macau Government during Portuguese rule

- Governador de Macau 澳門總督
- Standard of the governor
- Status: His/Her Excellency
- Residence: Macau Government House
- Seat: Macau Government Headquarters
- Nominator: Prime Minister of Portugal
- Appointer: Monarch of Portugal (1623–1910); President of Portugal (1910–1999)
- Formation: 7 July 1623
- First holder: Francisco Mascarenhas
- Final holder: Vasco Joaquim Rocha Vieira
- Abolished: 20 December 1999
- Succession: Chief Executive of Macau

Governor of Macau

Chinese name
- Traditional Chinese: 澳門總督
- Simplified Chinese: 澳门总督
Transcriptions
Standard Mandarin
- Hanyu Pinyin: Àomén Zǒngdū
Yue: Cantonese
- Jyutping: ou3 mun4*2 zung2 duk1

Portuguese name
- Portuguese: Governador de Macau

The governor of Macau (Portuguese: Governador de Macau; Chinese: 澳門總督) was a Portuguese colonial official who headed the colony of Macau, before 1623 called captain-major (Portuguese: Capitão-mor). The post was replaced on 20 December 1999 upon the handover of Macau to China by the office of the chief executive of Macau.

== Powers of the governor of Macau ==
The governor of Macau was responsible for the internal and local control of the colony. External relations and military needs were dealt by the Portuguese government in Lisbon.

== List of captains-major and governors of Macau (1557–1999) ==
The date refers to the date of appointment.

=== Captains-major ===
Name	Tenure
Francisco Martins	1557–1558
Leonel de Sousa	1558–1559
Rui Barreto	1559–1560
Manuel de Mendonça	1560–1561
Fernão de Sousa	1561–1562
Pêro Barreto Rolim	1562–1563
Diogo Pereira	1563–1565
João Pedro Pereira	1565–1566
Simão de Mendonça (1st time)	1566–1567
Tristão Vaz da Veiga (1st time)	1567–1568
António de Sousa	1568–1569
Manuel Travassos	1569–1571
Tristão Vaz da Veiga (2nd time)	1571–1572
João de Almeida (1st time)	1572–1573
António de Vilhena	1573–1574
Simão de Mendonça (2nd time)	1574–1575
Vasco Pereira	1575–1576
Domingos Monteiro (1st time)	1576–1579
Leonel de Brito	1579–1580
Miguel da Gama	1580–1581
Inácio de Lima	1581–1582
João de Almeida (2nd time)	1582–1583
Aires Gonçalves de Miranda	1583–1585
Francisco Pais	1585–1586
Domingos Monteiro (2nd time)	1586–1587
Jerónimo Pereira	1587–1589
...	1589
Henrique da Costa	1590–1591
Roque de Melo Pereira	1591–1592
Domingos Monteiro (3rd time)	1592–1593
Gaspar Pinto da Rocha	1593–1594
...	1594
Manuel de Miranda	1595–1596
Rui Mendes de Figueiredo	1596–1597
...	1597
Nuno de Mendonça	1598–1599
Paulo de Portugal	1599–1603
Gonçalo Rodrigues de Sousa	1603–1604
João Caiado de Gamboa	1604–1605
Diogo de Vasconcelos de Meneses	1605–1607
André Pessoa	1607–1609
...	1609
Pedro Martim Gaio	1609–1611
Miguel de Sousa Pimentel	1611–1612
João Serrão da Cunha	1612–1614
Martim da Cunha	1614–1616
Francisco Lopes Carrasco	1616–1617
Lopo Sarmento de Carvalho (1st time)	1617–1618
António de Oliveira de Morais	1618–1619
Jerónimo de Macedo de Carvalho	1619–1621
Lopo Sarmento de Carvalho (2nd time)	1621–1623

=== Governors ===
No.	Portrait	Name	Tenure	
No.	Portrait	Name	Took office	Left office
1		Francisco Mascarenhas	7 July 1623	19 July 1626
2		Filipe Lobo	19 July 1626	1629
3		Jerónimo da Silveira	1630	1 December 1631
4		Manuel da Câmara de Noronha	1 December 1631	1637
5		Domingos da Câmara de Noronha	1637	1638
6		Sebastião Lobo da Silveira	1638	1644
7		Luís de Carvalho e Sousa	1644	1646
8		Diogo Coutinho Docem	1646	1646
9		João Pereira	1646	1649
10		João de Sousa Pereira	1649	1655
11		Manuel Tavares Bocarro	1656	1664
12		Manuel Borges da Silva	22 July 1664	31 August 1667
13		Álvaro da Silva	31 August 1667	20 July 1670
14		Manuel Borges da Silva	20 July 1670	20 July 1672
15		António Barbosa Lobo	20 July 1672	1676
16		António de Castro Sande	1676	10 December 1679
17		Luís de Melo Sampaio	10 December 1679	10 December 1682
18		Belchior do Amaral de Meneses	10 December 1682	5 July 1685
19		António de Mesquita Pimentel	5 July 1685	31 July 1688
20		André Coelho Vieira	31 July 1688	21 July 1691
21		Francisco da Costa	21 July 1691	23 November 1693
22		António da Silva e Melo	23 November 1693	21 July 1694
23		Gil Vaz Lobo Freire	21 July 1694	17 August 1697
24		Cosme Rodrigues de Carvalho e Sousa	17 August 1697	28 September 1697
—		Municipal Council of Macau	28 September 1697	9 August 1698
24		Pedro Vaz de Sequeira	9 August 1698	1699
25		Diogo de Melo Sampaio	1699	22 July 1702
26		Pedro Vaz de Sequeira	22 July 1702	15 August 1703
27		José da Gama Machado	15 August 1703	5 August 1706
28		Diogo do Pinho Teixeira	5 August 1706	28 July 1710
29		Francisco de Melo e Castro	28 July 1710	11 June 1711
30		António de Sequeira de Noronha	11 June 1711	18 July 1714
31		Francisco de Alarcão Sotto-Maior	18 July 1714	30 May 1718
32		António de Albuquerque Coelho	30 May 1718	9 September 1719
33		António da Silva Telo e Meneses	9 September 1719	19 August 1722
34		Cristóvão de Severim Manuel	19 August 1722	1723
35		António Carneiro de Alcáçova	6 September 1724	11 August 1727
36		António Moniz Barreto	11 August 1727	18 August 1732
37		António de Amaral Meneses	18 August 1732	15 January 1735
38		João de Casal	15 January 1735	4 August 1735
39		Cosme Damião Pereira Pinto	4 August 1735	25 August 1738
40		Manuel Pereira Coutinho	25 August 1738	25 August 1743
41		Cosme Damião Pereira Pinto	25 August 1743	30 August 1747
42		António José Teles de Meneses	30 August 1747	2 August 1749
43		João Manuel de Melo	2 August 1749	29 July 1752
44		Rodrigo de Castro	29 July 1752	14 July 1755
45		Francisco António Pereira Coutinho	14 July 1755	1 July 1758
46		Diogo Pereira	1 July 1758	4 July 1761
47		António de Mendonça Corte Real	4 July 1761	14 July 1764
48		José Plácido de Matos Saraiva	14 July 1764	19 August 1767
49		Diogo Fernandes Salema de Saldanha	19 August 1767	29 July 1770
50		Rodrigo de Castro	29 July 1770	26 July 1771
51		Diogo Fernandes Salema de Saldanha	26 July 1771	27 January 1778
52		Alexandre Pedrosa da Silva Guimarães	27 January 1778	1 August 1778
53		José Vicente da Silveira de Meneses	1 August 1778	5 January 1780
54		António José da Costa	5 January 1780	August 1780
55		Francisco Xavier de Castro	1780	18 August 1783
56		Bernardo Aleixo de Lemos e Faria	18 August 1783	21 July 1788
57		Francisco Xavier de Mendonça Corte-Real	21 July 1788	18 July 1789
58		Lázaro da Silva Ferreira and Manuel António da Costa Ferreira (Co-serving)	18 July 1789	29 July 1790
59		Vasco Luís Carneiro de Sousa e Faro	29 July 1790	27 July 1793
60		José Manuel Pinto	27 July 1793	8 August 1797
61		Cristóvão Pereira de Castro	8 August 1797	8 August 1800
62		José Manuel Pinto	8 August 1800	8 August 1803
63		Caetano de Sousa Pereira	8 August 1803	8 August 1806
64		Bernardo Aleixo de Lemos Faria	8 August 1806	26 December 1808
65		Lucas José de Alvarenga	26 December 1808	19 July 1810
66		Bernardo Aleixo de Lemos Faria	19 July 1810	1817
67		José Osório de Castro Cabral de Albuquerque	19 July 1817	19 August 1822
—		Municipal Council of Macau	19 August 1822	23 September 1823
—		Government Council	23 September 1823	28 July 1825
68		Joaquim Mourão Garcêz Palha	28 July 1825	15 November 1827
—		Government Council	15 November 1827	1829
69		João Cabral de Estefique	1829	3 July 1833
70		Bernardo José de Sousa Soares de Andreia	3 July 1833	22 February 1837
71		Adrião Acácio da Silveira Pinto	22 February 1837	3 October 1843
72		José Gregório Pegado	3 October 1843	21 April 1846
73		João Maria Ferreira do Amaral	21 April 1846	22 August 1849
—		Government Council	22 August 1849	30 May 1850
74		Pedro Alexandrino da Cunha	30 May 1850	7 July 1850
—		Government Council	7 July 1850	3 February 1851
75		Francisco António Gonçalves Cardoso	3 February 1851	19 November 1851
76		Isidoro Francisco Guimarães	19 November 1851	22 June 1863
77		José Rodrigues Coelho do Amaral	22 June 1863	26 October 1866
78		José Maria da Ponte e Horta	26 October 1866	3 August 1868
79		António Sérgio de Sousa	3 August 1868	23 March 1872
80		Januário Correia de Almeida	23 March 1872	7 December 1874
81		José Maria Lobo de Ávila	7 December 1874	31 December 1876
82		Carlos Eugénio Correia da Silva	31 December 1876	1879
—		Government Council	1879	
83		Joaquim José da Graça	28 November 1879	23 April 1883
—		Government Council	1883	
84		Tomás de Sousa Rosa	23 April 1883	7 August 1886
85		Firmino José da Costa	7 August 1886	1888
—		Government Council	1888	1889
86		Francisco Teixeira da Silva	5 February 1889	1890
87		Francisco Augusto Ferreira da Silva	1890	
88		Custódio Miguel de Borja	16 October 1890	1894
89		José Maria de Sousa Horta e Costa	24 March 1894	12 May 1897
—		Government Council	1897	
90		Eduardo Augusto Rodrigues Galhardo	12 May 1897	1900
—		Government Council	1900	
91		José Maria de Sousa Horta e Costa	12 August 1900	17 December 1902
92		Arnaldo de Novais Guedes Rebelo	17 December 1902	10 December 1903
—		Government Council	10 December 1903	5 April 1904
93		Martinho Pinto de Queirós Montenegro	5 April 1904	6 April 1907
94		José Emílio Santana da Cunha Castelo Branco (interim governor)	1907	
95		Pedro de Azevedo Coutinho	6 April 1907	18 August 1908
96		Francisco Diogo de Sá (interim governor)	1908	
97		José Augusto Alves Roçadas	18 August 1908	22 September 1909
98		Eduardo Augusto Marques	22 September 1909	1910
99		João Marques Vidal (interim governor)	1910	
100		Álvaro de Melo Machado (interim governor)	17 December 1910	14 July 1912
101		Aníbal Augusto Sanches de Sousa Miranda (interim governor)	14 July 1912	10 June 1914
102		José Maria Martins Pereira	1914	
103		José Carlos da Maia	10 June 1914	5 September 1916
104		Manuel Ferreira da Rocha	5 September 1916	1917
—		Government Council	1917	
105		Fernando Augusto Vieira de Matos (interim governor)	1917	1918
106		Artur Tamagnini de Sousa Barbosa	12 October 1918	1919
—		Joaquim Augusto dos Santos (acting governor)	1919	
107		Henrique Monteiro Correia da Silva	23 August 1919	5 January 1922
—		Luís António de Magalhães Correia (acting governor)	1922	1923
108		Rodrigo José Rodrigues	1923	1924
—		Joaquim Augusto dos Santos (acting governor)	1924	1925
109		Manuel Firmino de Almeida Maia Magalhães	18 October 1925	1926
—		Hugo Carvalho de Lacerda Castelo Branco (acting governor)	1926	
110		Artur Tamagnini de Sousa Barbosa	8 December 1926	1930
—		João Pereira Magalhães (acting governor)	1930	1931
111		Joaquim Anselmo de Mata Oliveira	30 March 1931	1931
—		João Pereira Magalhães (acting governor)	1931	1932
112		António José Bernardes de Miranda	21 June 1932	1935
113		João Pereira Barbosa (interim governor)	1935	1936
—		António Joaquim Ferreira da Silva (acting governor)	1936	1937
—		João Pinto Crisóstomo (acting governor)	1937	
114		Artur Tamagnini de Sousa Barbosa	11 April 1937	1940
—		José Rodrigues Moutinho (acting governor)	1940	
115		Gabriel Maurício Teixeira	29 October 1940	1946
—		Samuel da Conceição Vieira (acting governor)	1946	1947
116		Albano Rodrigues de Oliveira	1 September 1947	1951
—		Aires Pinto Ribeiro (acting governor)	1951	
117		Joaquim Marques Esparteiro	13 November 1951	1956
—		João Carlos Guedes Quinhones de Portugal da Silveira (acting governor)	1956	1957
118		Pedro Correia de Barros	8 March 1957	1958
—		Manuel Peixoto Nunes (acting governor)	1958	1959
119		Jaime Silvério Marques	18 September 1959	1962
—		Eduardo Luís de Sousa Gentil Beça (acting governor)	1962	
120		António Lopes dos Santos	17 April 1962	25 November 1966
121		José Manuel de Sousa e Faro Nobre de Carvalho	25 November 1966	19 November 1974
122		José Eduardo Martinho Garcia Leandro	19 November 1974	27 November 1979
123		Nuno Viriato Tavares de Melo Egídio	28 November 1979	16 June 1981
124		Vasco de Almeida e Costa	16 June 1981	14 May 1986
125		Joaquim Pinto Correia	15 May 1986	9 July 1987
—		Carlos Augusto Pulido Valente Monjardino (acting governor)	1987	
126		Carlos Montez Melancia	9 July 1987	1990
—		Francisco Murteira Nabo (acting governor)	1990	1991
127		Vasco Joaquim Rocha Vieira	23 April 1991	19 December 1999

== See also ==
- History of Macau
- Portuguese Macau
