= Mesa Laboratory =

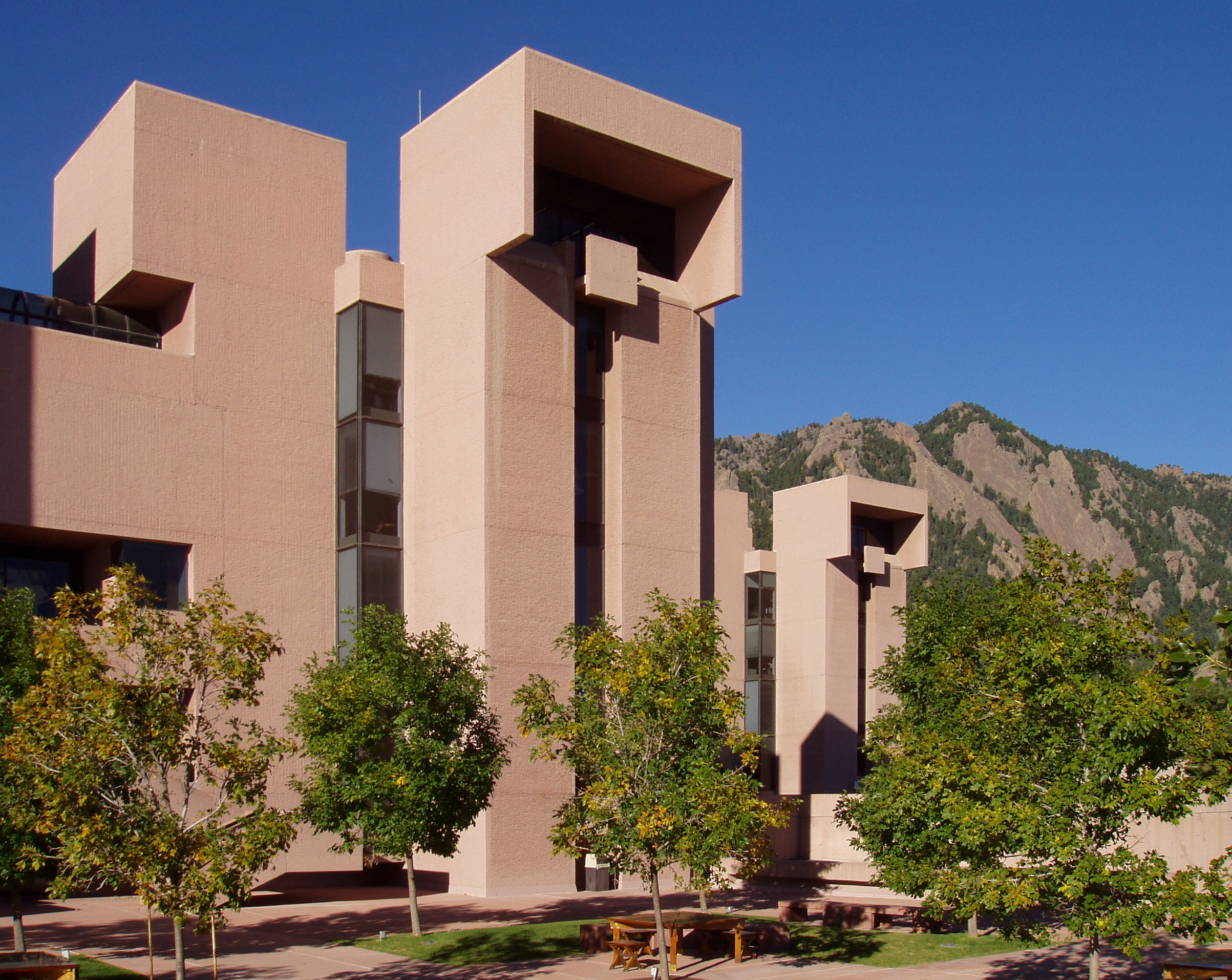
- Interactive map of the Mesa Laboratory area
- Alternative names: National Center for Atmospheric Research

General information
- Type: Research laboratory
- Architectural style: Modern
- Location: Boulder, Colorado, 1850 Table Mesa Drive
- Coordinates: 39.97777°N 105.274966°W
- Construction started: June 1964
- Completed: February 1967
- Cost: $4,500,000 (1964)

Dimensions
- Other dimensions: 565 acres (2.29 km^{2}; 0.883 sq mi)

Technical details
- Structural system: Concrete
- Floor count: 7
- Floor area: 243,000 sq ft (22,600 m^{2})

Design and construction
- Architect: I. M. Pei
- Architecture firm: Pei Cobb Freed & Partners
- Structural engineer: Weiskopf & Pickworth
- Awards: 1967 Industrial Research: Laboratory of the Year; 1997 AIA, Colorado Chapter: 25 Year Award

The Mesa Laboratory of the National Center for Atmospheric Research is a research center located in Boulder, Colorado. The building complex was designed by modernist architect I. M. Pei in 1961 as his first project outside of city building design. It has been noted for its Anasazi-inspired architecture and use of bush-hammered concrete to blend into the surrounding area.

== Design and construction ==
In 1960 the University Corporation for Atmospheric Research (UCAR) appointed Walter Orr Roberts as the founding director of the National Center for Atmospheric Research (NCAR) and designated the Table Mesa below the Flatirons sandstone cliffs as its laboratory site. After agreeing to preserve the entire 565-acre (2.29 km^{2}) site from development, the state of Colorado purchased the land and turned it over to NCAR for the research laboratory. Pietro Belluschi, then the dean of architecture at the Massachusetts Institute of Technology advised Roberts on the selection of the architect for the center. Utilizing the deans of architecture at the UCAR constituent universities as an expert committee, they eventually selected I. M. Pei as the project's architect. Until this time, Pei had been known for his work on large-scale urban projects and for his innovative use of concrete in building and lacked a reputation in rural projects or laboratory constructions.

However, from 1962 to 1964 Pei dedicated a significant portion of his time to designing the lab. Through his revisions he moved from a single tall tower concept to a series of three 5 story towers set up in a village-like model. Also, he moved from a single stage construction to an incremental two phase approach that better suited NCAR's National Science Foundation-imposed budget constraints. Despite the budgetary constraints, Pei managed to incorporate such features as bush-hammering of the concrete finish and crows nests on top of the towers that sought to meet NCAR's goal of a complex structure.

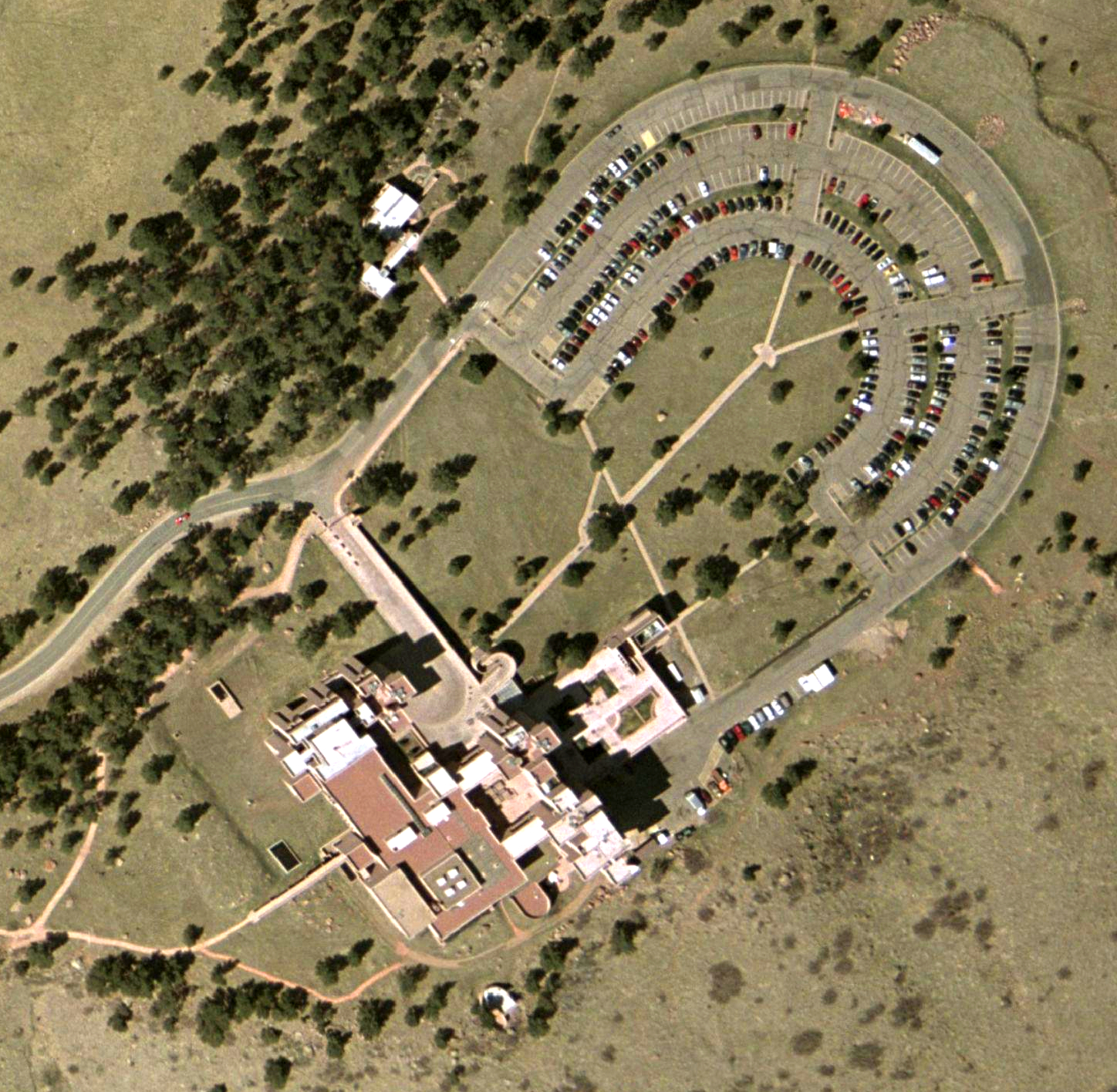
Aerial view of the lab

Pei based his design on the Anasazi cliff dwellings of Mesa Verde. He used techniques such as bush-hammering the concrete, laying out geometric shapes for the buildings, and using a local pinkish aggregate to help the complex blend in with the surrounding Flatirons hills on the Table Mesa. He also laid out the building in a maze-like fashion to encourage greater interaction among the scientists.

In January 1963 the NSF approved Pei's design, modifying it by removing the south tower and conference center to meet the budget constraints. In April 1964 the Martin K. Eby Construction Company broke ground on the lab, with an estimated cost of $23.50 per square foot, well within the limit set of $25. The building was completed in 1966 and dedicated in 1967. Despite problems with leaky roofs and personnel flow, the building was considered a success in the scientific and architectural communities and, as of 2009, remains the primary NCAR laboratory.

In 1969 Pei designed the complementary Fleischmann Building on the same site to serve as the administrative headquarters of UCAR. The main building was expanded underground in 1977 to make room for the expanded supercomputer studies and in 1980 an above-ground annex provided additional space. In 2008, Pei donated a 68 by 98-inch (2,500 mm) model of the Mesa site from the 1960s to the laboratory for a history display.

== Reaction ==
The lab won the 1967 Laboratory of the Year award by Industrial Research Magazine and the 1997 American Institute of Architects: Colorado Chapter's 25 Year Award. The latter award is given for buildings that continue to serve their original function and have withstood the "test of time" over a 25- to 35-year period. The center was also named Best Research Center by Go! magazine in 2007.

== Appearances in popular culture ==
- The Mesa Laboratory appeared prominently towards the end of the 1973 Woody Allen cult classic film Sleeper, wherein it also serves as the location of a laboratory.
- It appears in the 1996 film The Arrival.
- The 2017 video game Horizon Zero Dawn used the building as the location of a bandit camp in its post-apocalyptic Colorado.
- The building appears as the exterior of a research laboratory in the 2024 film Elevation.
