= I. M. Pei =

Chinese-American architect (1917–2019)

I. M. Pei FAIA RIBA
- 貝聿銘
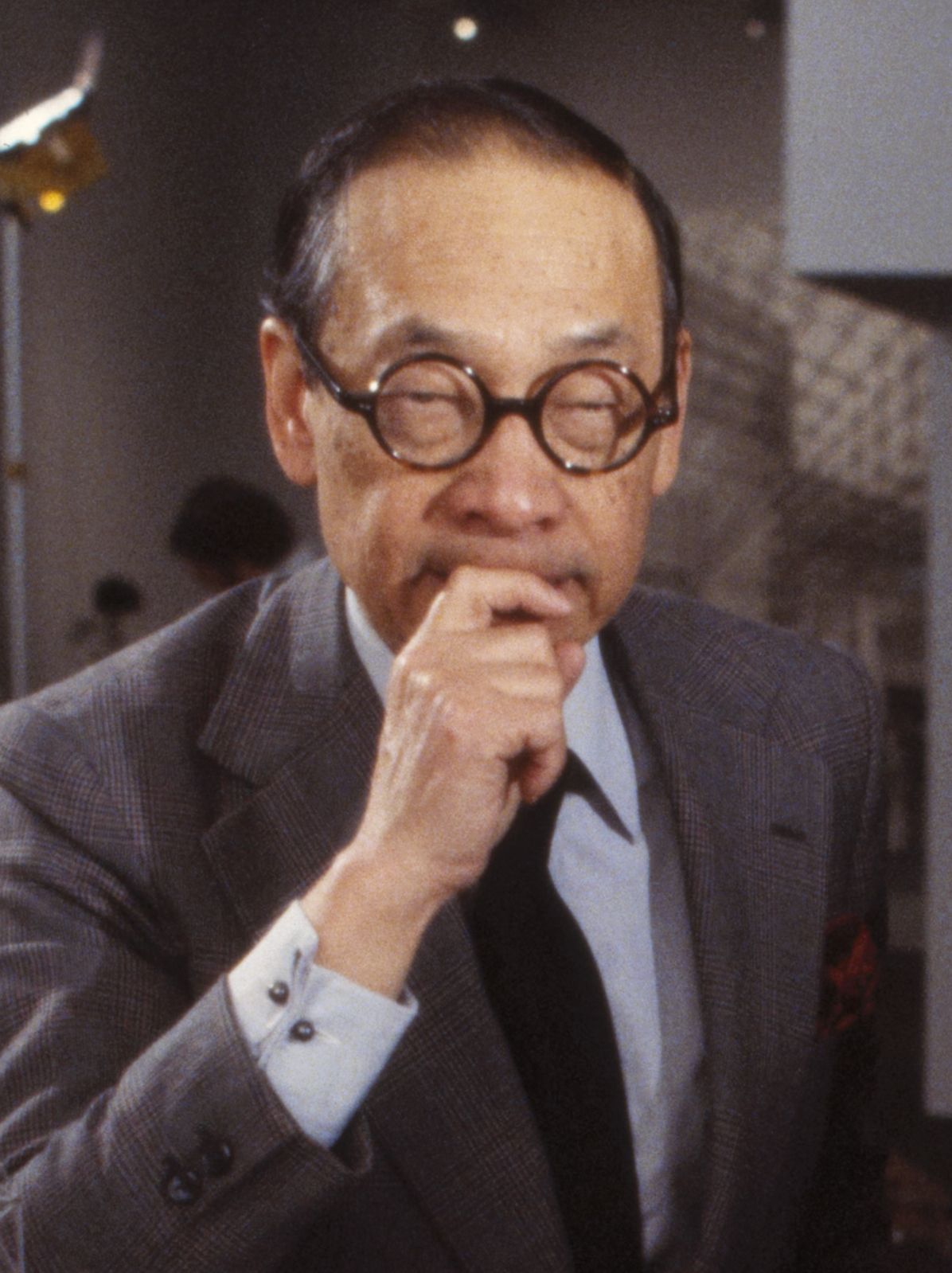
- Pei in 1980
- Born: April 26, 1917; Guangzhou, Guangdong, Republic of China
- Died: May 16, 2019 (aged 102); New York City, U.S.
- Education: University of Pennsylvania; Massachusetts Institute of Technology (BArch); Harvard University (MArch)
- Occupation: Architect
- Spouse: Eileen Loo (m. 1942; died 2014)
- Children: 4
- Awards: Royal Gold Medal; AIA Gold Medal; Medal of Freedom; Pritzker Prize; Praemium Imperiale
- Practice: I. M. Pei & Associates (1955–2019); I. M. Pei & Partners (1966–2019); Pei Cobb Freed & Partners (1989–2019); Pei Partnership Architects (consultant, 1992–2019)
- Buildings: John F. Kennedy Library; National Gallery of Art East Building; Grand Louvre & Louvre Pyramid; Everson Museum of Art; Bank of China Tower, Hong Kong; Museum of Islamic Art, Doha; Dallas City Hall; Indiana University Art Museum; Herbert F. Johnson Museum of Art; Rock and Roll Hall of Fame; Miho Museum; John Hancock Tower; Roosevelt Field; City View (Pittsburgh); Mesa Laboratory

Chinese name
- Traditional Chinese: 貝聿銘
- Simplified Chinese: 贝聿铭
Transcriptions
Standard Mandarin
- Hanyu Pinyin: Bèi Yùmíng
- Wade–Giles: Pei^{4} Yü^{4}-ming^{2}
- Yale Romanization: Bèi Yùmíng
- IPA: [pêɪ ŷ.mǐŋ]
Wu
- Suzhounese: Pe^{5} Yuq^{8} Min^{2}
Yue: Cantonese
- Yale Romanization: Bui Yuht Mìhng
- Jyutping: Bui3 Jyut6 Ming4
- IPA: [pūːi jỳːt mɪ̏ŋ]

Ieoh Ming Pei (/ˌjoʊ mɪŋ ˈpeɪ/ YOH ming PAY; Chinese: 貝聿銘; pinyin: Bèi Yùmíng; April 26, 1917 – May 16, 2019) was a Chinese-American architect.

Born in Guangzhou into a Chinese family, Pei drew inspiration at an early age from the garden villas at Suzhou, the traditional retreat of the scholar-gentry to which his family belonged. In 1935, he moved to the United States and enrolled in the University of Pennsylvania's architecture school, but quickly transferred to the Massachusetts Institute of Technology. Unhappy with the focus on Beaux-Arts architecture at both schools, he spent his free time researching emerging architects, especially Le Corbusier.

After graduating from MIT, Pei enrolled in the Harvard Graduate School of Design (GSD) where he befriended faculty members Walter Gropius and Marcel Breuer, both of whom had formerly taught at the Bauhaus. Beginning in 1948, Pei worked as an in-house architect for New York City real estate developer William Zeckendorf. In 1955, he established an independent design firm, I. M. Pei & Associates. In 1966, the firm was reorganized as I. M. Pei & Partners, and in 1989 reorganized as Pei Cobb Freed & Partners. Pei retired from full-time practice in 1990. In his retirement, he worked as an architectural consultant primarily with his sons' architectural firm Pei Partnership Architects.

Pei's first major recognition came with the Mesa Laboratory at the National Center for Atmospheric Research in Colorado (designed in 1961, and completed in 1967). His new stature led to his selection as chief architect for the John F. Kennedy Library in Massachusetts. He went on to design Dallas City Hall and the East Building of the National Gallery of Art. He returned to China for the first time in 1975 to design a hotel at Fragrant Hills and, fifteen years later, designed Bank of China Tower, Hong Kong. In the early 1980s, Pei was the focus of controversy when he designed a glass-and-steel pyramid for the Louvre in Paris. He designed the Morton H. Meyerson Symphony Center in Dallas, the Miho Museum in Japan, the Suzhou Museum in Suzhou, the Museum of Islamic Art in Qatar, and the Grand Duke Jean Museum of Modern Art in Luxembourg.

Pei won prizes and awards in the field of architecture, including the AIA Gold Medal in 1979, the first Praemium Imperiale for Architecture in 1989, and the Lifetime Achievement Award from the Cooper-Hewitt, National Design Museum, in 2003. In 1983, he won the Pritzker Prize, which is sometimes referred to as the Nobel Prize of architecture.

== Childhood ==
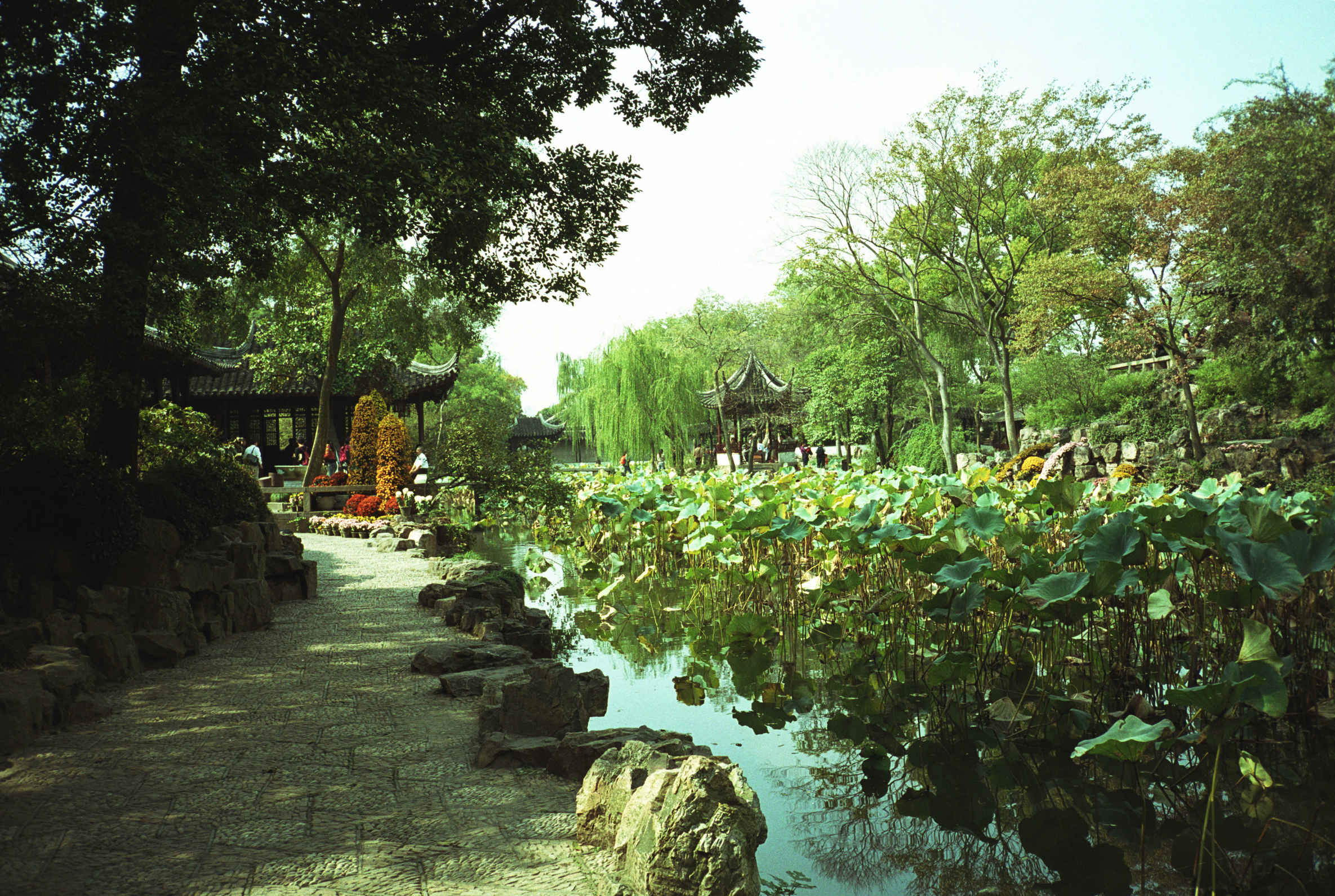
As a child, Pei found the Shizilin Garden in Suzhou to be "an ideal playground".

I. M. Pei's ancestry traces back to the Ming dynasty, when his family moved from Anhui to Suzhou. The family made their wealth in medicinal herbs, then joined the ranks of the scholar-gentry. Pei Ieoh Ming was born on April 26, 1917, to Tsuyee and Lien Kwun, and the family moved to Hong Kong one year later. It eventually included five children. As a boy, Pei was very close to his mother, a devout Buddhist, who was recognized for her skills as a flautist. She invited him, but not his brothers or sisters, to join her on meditation retreats. His relationship with his father was less intimate. Their interactions were respectful but distant.

Pei's ancestors' success meant that the family lived in the upper echelons of society, but Pei said his father was "not cultivated in the ways of the arts". The younger Pei, drawn more to music and other cultural forms than to his father's domain of banking, explored art on his own. "I have cultivated myself," he said later.

Pei studied in St. Paul's College in Hong Kong as a child. When Pei was 10, his father received a promotion and relocated with his family to Shanghai. Pei attended St. John's Middle School, the secondary school of St. John's University that was run by Anglican missionaries. Academic discipline was rigorous; students were allowed only one half-day each month for leisure. Pei enjoyed playing billiards and watching Hollywood movies, especially those of Buster Keaton and Charlie Chaplin. He also learned rudimentary English by reading the Bible and novels by Charles Dickens.

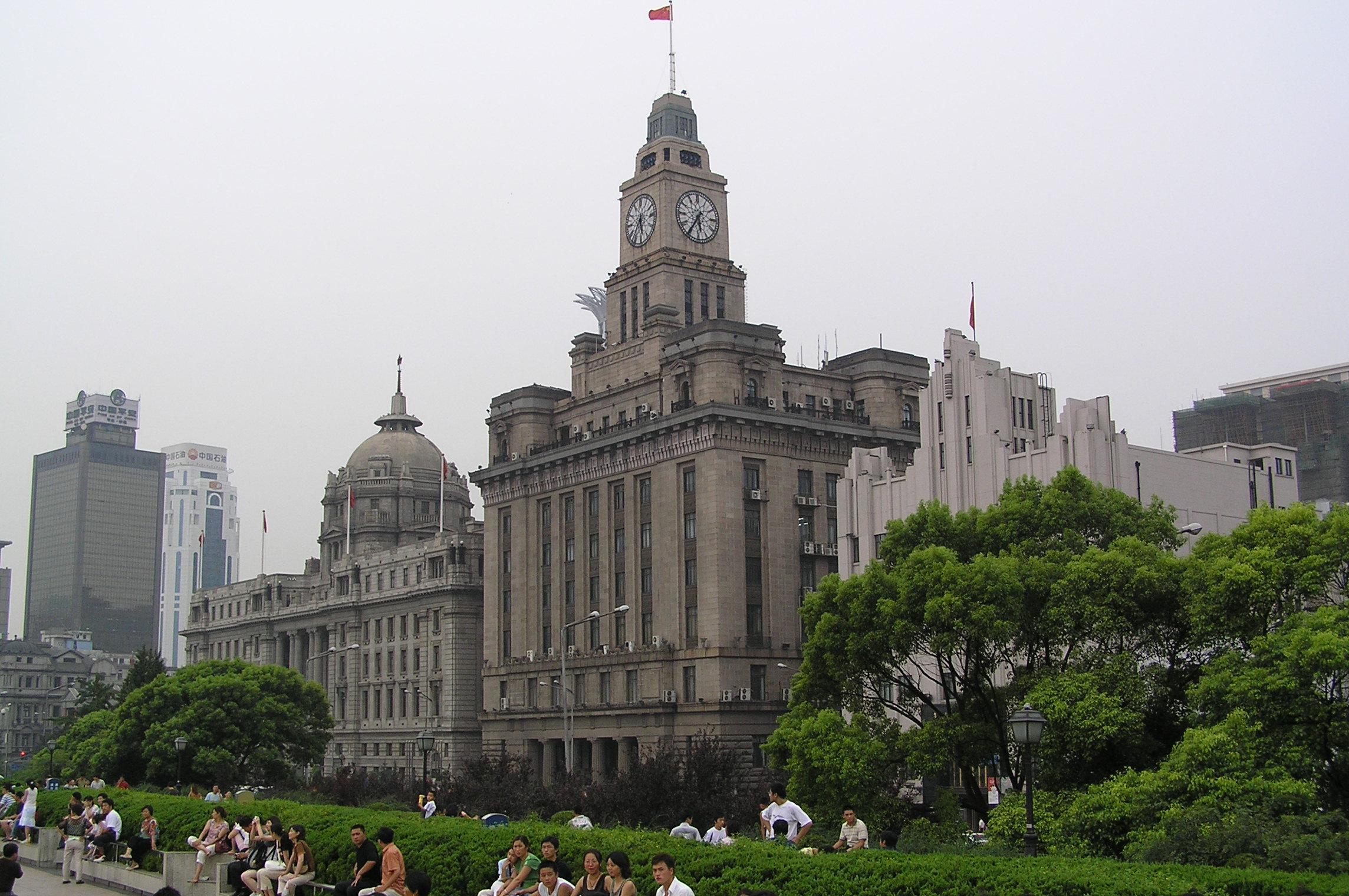
Pei describes the architecture of Shanghai's Bund waterfront area (seen here in a 2004 photo) as "very much a colonial past".

Shanghai's many international elements gave it the name "Paris of the East". The city's global architectural flavors had a profound influence on Pei, from The Bund waterfront area to the Park Hotel, built in 1934. He was also impressed by the many gardens of Suzhou, where he spent the summers with extended family and regularly visited a nearby ancestral shrine. The Shizilin Garden, built in the 14th century by a Buddhist monk and owned by Pei's uncle Bei Runsheng, was especially influential. He spoke later of his fondness for the garden's blending of natural and human-built structures.

Soon after the move to Shanghai, Pei's mother developed cancer. She was prescribed opium for pain and assigned the task of preparing her pipe to Pei. She died shortly after his thirteenth birthday, and he was profoundly upset. The children were sent to live with extended family, as their father became more consumed by his work. Pei said: "My father began living his own separate life pretty soon after that." His father later married a woman named Aileen, who moved to New York later in her life.

== Education and formative years ==
As Pei neared the end of his secondary education, he decided to attend university. He was accepted by a number of schools, but enrolled at the University of Pennsylvania. Pei's choice had two roots. While studying in Shanghai, he had closely examined the catalogs for various institutions of higher learning around the world. The architectural program at the University of Pennsylvania stood out to him. The other major factor was Hollywood. Pei was fascinated by the representations of college life in the films of Bing Crosby, which differed tremendously from the academic atmosphere in China. "College life in the U.S. seemed to me to be mostly fun and games", he said in 2000. "Since I was too young to be serious, I wanted to be part of it ... You could get a feeling for it in Bing Crosby's movies. College life in America seemed very exciting to me. It's not real, we know that. Nevertheless, at that time it was very attractive to me." Pei added that "Crosby's films in particular had a tremendous influence on my choosing the United States instead of England to pursue my education."

In 1935, Pei boarded a boat and sailed to San Francisco, then traveled by train to Philadelphia. What he found once he arrived differed vastly from his expectations. Professors at the University of Pennsylvania based their teaching in the Beaux-Arts style, rooted in the classical traditions of ancient Greece and Rome. Pei was more intrigued by modern architecture, and also felt intimidated by the high level of drafting proficiency shown by other students. He decided to abandon architecture and transferred to the engineering program at Massachusetts Institute of Technology (MIT). Once he arrived, however, the dean of the architecture school commented on his eye for design and convinced Pei to return to his original major.

MIT's architecture faculty was also focused on the Beaux-Arts school, and Pei found himself uninspired by the work. In the library he found three books by the Swiss-French architect Le Corbusier. Pei was inspired by the innovative designs of the new International Style, characterized by simplified form and the use of glass and steel materials. Le Corbusier visited MIT in November 1935, an occasion which powerfully affected Pei: "The two days with Le Corbusier, or 'Corbu' as we used to call him, were probably the most important days in my architectural education." Pei was also influenced by the work of U.S. architect Frank Lloyd Wright. In 1938 he drove to Spring Green, Wisconsin, to visit Wright's famous Taliesin building. After waiting for two hours, however, he left without meeting Wright.

Although he disliked the Beaux-Arts emphasis, Pei excelled in his studies. "I certainly don't regret the time at MIT", he said later. "There I learned the science and technique of building, which is just as essential to architecture." Pei received his BArch degree in 1940; his thesis was titled "Standardized Propaganda Units for War Time and Peace Time China".

While visiting New York City in the late 1930s, Pei met a Wellesley College student named Eileen Loo. They began dating and married in the spring of 1942. She enrolled in the landscape architecture program at Harvard University, and Pei was thus introduced to members of the faculty at Harvard's Graduate School of Design (GSD). He was excited by the lively atmosphere and joined the GSD in December 1942.

Less than a month later, Pei suspended his work at Harvard to join the National Defense Research Committee, which coordinated scientific research into U.S. weapons technology during World War II. Pei's background in architecture was seen as a considerable asset; one member of the committee told him: "If you know how to build you should also know how to destroy." The fight against Germany was ending, so he focused on the Pacific War. The U.S. realized that its bombs used against the stone buildings of Europe would be ineffective against Japanese cities, mostly constructed from wood and paper; Pei was assigned to work on incendiary bombs. Pei spent two and a half years with the NDRC, but revealed few details of his work.

In 1945, Eileen gave birth to a son, T'ing Chung, and she withdrew from the landscape architecture program in order to care for him. Pei returned to Harvard in the autumn of 1945, and received a position as assistant professor of design. The GSD was developing into a hub of resistance to the Beaux-Arts orthodoxy. At the center were members of the Bauhaus, a European architectural movement that had advanced the cause of modernist design. The Nazi regime had condemned the Bauhaus school, and its leaders left Germany. Two of them, Walter Gropius and Marcel Breuer, took positions at the Harvard GSD. Their iconoclastic focus on modern architecture appealed to Pei, and he worked closely with both men.

One of Pei's design projects at the GSD was a plan for an art museum in Shanghai. He wanted to create a mood of Chinese authenticity in the architecture without using traditional materials or styles. The design was based on straight modernist structures, organized around a central courtyard garden, with other similar natural settings arranged nearby. It was very well received, with Gropius calling it "the best thing done in [my] master class." Pei received his MArch degree in 1946, and taught at Harvard for another two years.

== Career ==
=== 1948–1956: early career with Webb and Knapp ===
In the spring of 1948, Pei was recruited by New York real estate magnate William Zeckendorf to join a staff of architects for his firm of Webb and Knapp to design buildings around the country. Pei found Zeckendorf's personality the opposite of his own; his new boss was known for his loud speech and gruff demeanor. Nevertheless, they became good friends and Pei found the experience personally enriching. Zeckendorf was well connected politically, and Pei enjoyed learning about the social world of New York's city planners.

His first project for Webb and Knapp was an apartment building, which received funding from the Housing Act of 1949. Pei's design was based on a circular tower with concentric rings. The areas closest to the supporting pillar handled utilities and circulation, and the apartments themselves were located toward the outer edge. Zeckendorf loved the design and even showed it off to Le Corbusier when they met. The cost of such an unusual design was too high, however, and the building never progressed beyond the model stage.

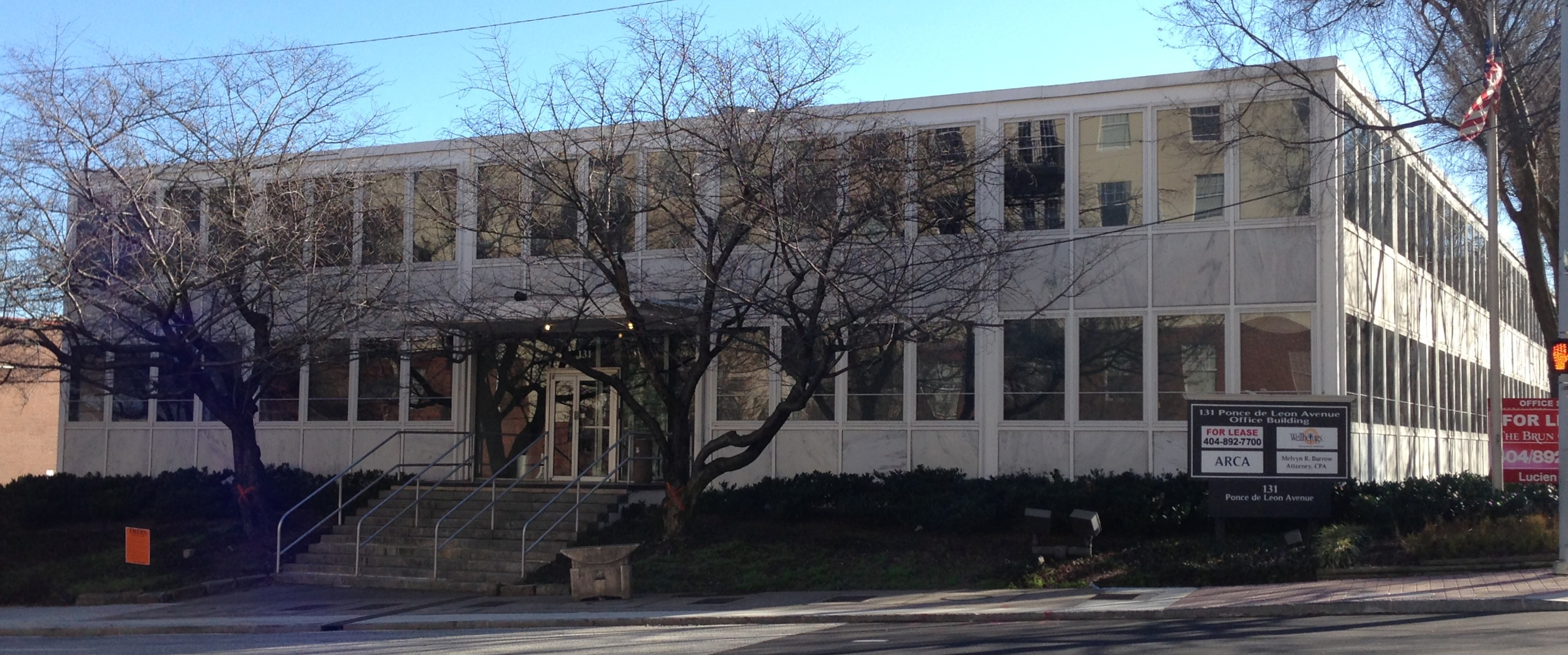
Pei's first project (1949): 131 Ponce de Leon Avenue, Atlanta

Pei finally saw his architecture come to life in 1949, when he designed a two-story corporate building for Gulf Oil in Atlanta, Georgia. The building was demolished in February 2013 although the front façade was retained as part of an apartment development. His use of marble for the exterior curtain wall brought praise from the journal Architectural Forum. Pei's designs echoed the work of Mies van der Rohe in the beginning of his career as also shown in his own weekend-house in Katonah, New York in 1952. Soon, Pei was so inundated with projects that he asked Zeckendorf for assistants, which he chose from his associates at the GSD, including Henry N. Cobb and Ulrich Franzen. They set to work on a variety of proposals, including the Roosevelt Field Shopping Mall on Long Island. The team also redesigned the Webb and Knapp office building, transforming Zeckendorf's office into a circular space with teak walls and a glass clerestory. They also installed a control panel into the desk that allowed their boss to control the lighting in his office. The project took one year and exceeded its budget, but Zeckendorf was delighted with the results.

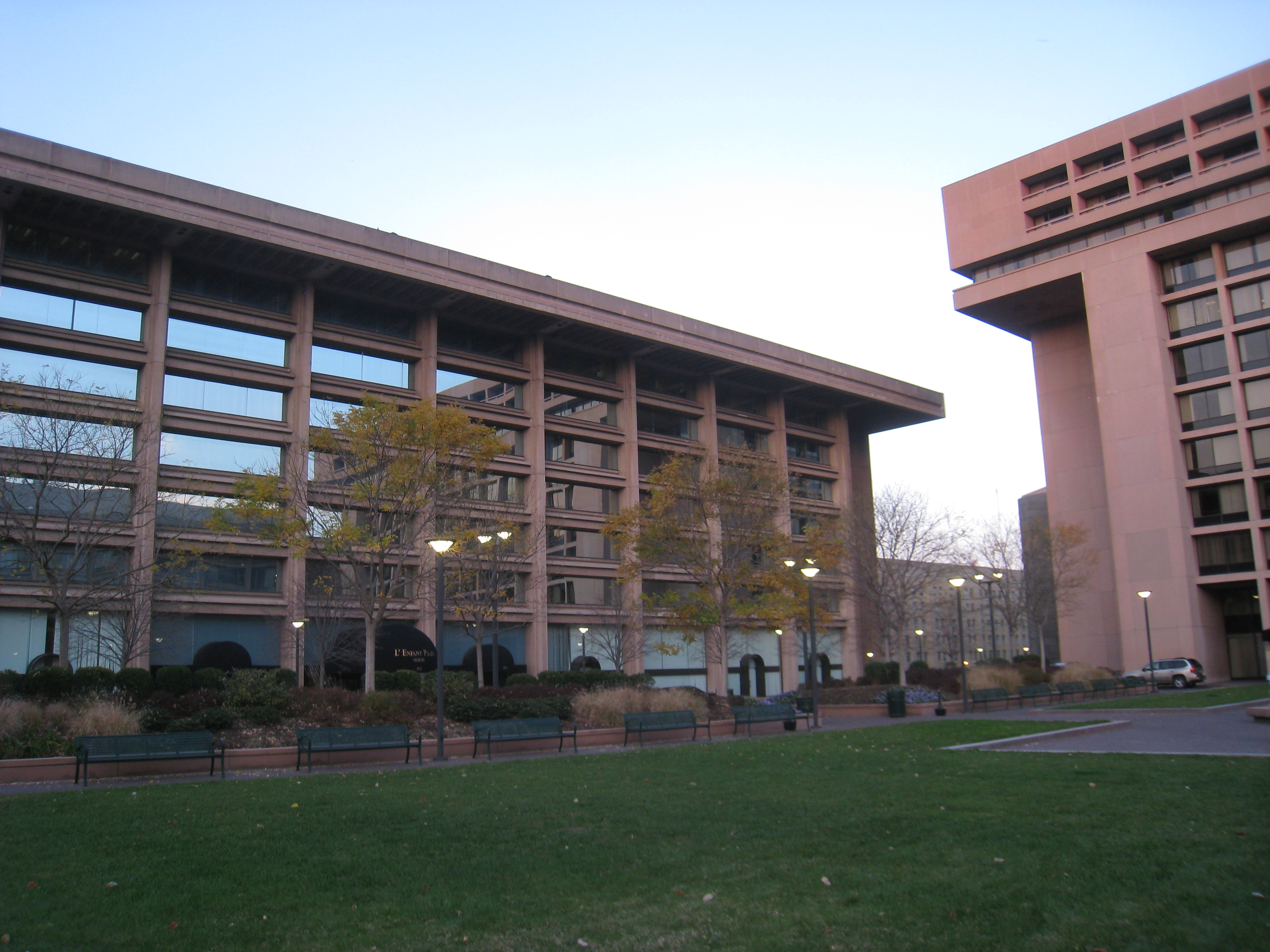
Pei wanted the open spaces and buildings of L'Enfant Plaza to be "functionally and visually related" to one another.

In 1952, Pei and his team began work on a series of projects in Denver, Colorado. The first of these was the Mile High Center, which compressed the core building into less than 25 percent of the total site; the rest is adorned with an exhibition hall and fountain-dotted plazas. One block away, Pei's team also redesigned Denver's Courthouse Square, which combined office spaces, commercial venues, and hotels. These projects helped Pei conceptualize architecture as part of the larger urban geography: "I learned the process of development, and about the city as a living organism." These lessons, he said, became essential for later projects.

Pei and his team also designed a united urban area for Washington, D.C., called L'Enfant Plaza (named for French-American architect Pierre Charles L'Enfant). Pei's associate Araldo Cossutta was the lead architect for the plaza's North Building and South Building. Vlastimil Koubek was the architect for the East Building (L'Enfant Plaza Hotel), and for the Center Building (now the United States Postal Service headquarters). The team set out with a broad vision that was praised by both The Washington Post and Washington Star (which rarely agreed on anything), but funding problems forced revisions and a significant reduction in scale.

In 1955, Pei's group took a step toward institutional independence from Webb and Knapp by establishing a new firm called I. M. Pei & Associates. (The name changed later to I. M. Pei & Partners.) They gained the freedom to work with other companies, but continued working primarily with Zeckendorf. The new firm distinguished itself through the use of detailed architectural models. They took on the Kips Bay residential area on the East Side of Manhattan, where Pei set up Kips Bay Towers, two large long towers of apartments with recessed windows (to provide shade and privacy) in a neat grid, adorned with rows of trees. Pei involved himself in the construction process at Kips Bay, even inspecting the bags of cement to check for consistency of color.

The company continued its urban focus with the Society Hill project in central Philadelphia. Pei designed the Society Hill Towers, a three-building residential block injecting cubist design into the local 18th-century milieu. As with previous projects, abundant green spaces were central to Pei's vision, which added traditional townhouses to aid the transition from classical to modern design.

From 1958 to 1963, Pei and Ray Affleck developed a key downtown block of Montreal in a phased process that involved one of Pei's most admired structures in the Commonwealth, the cruciform tower known as the Royal Bank Plaza (Place Ville Marie). According to The Canadian Encyclopedia :

its grand plaza and lower office buildings, designed by internationally famous US architect I. M. Pei, helped to set new standards for architecture in Canada in the 1960s ... The tower's smooth aluminum and glass surface and crisp unadorned geometric form demonstrate Pei's adherence to the mainstream of 20th-century modern design.

Although those projects were satisfying, Pei wanted to establish an independent name for himself. In 1959, he was approached by MIT to design a building for its Earth science program. The Green Building continued the grid design of Kips Bay and Society Hill. The pedestrian walkway on the ground floor, however, was prone to sudden gusts of wind, which embarrassed Pei. "Here I was from MIT," he said, "and I didn't know about wind-tunnel effects." At the same time, he co-designed the Luce Memorial Chapel at Tunghai University in Taichung, Taiwan. The soaring structure, commissioned by the same organization that had run his middle school in Shanghai, broke severely from the cubist grid patterns of his urban projects.

The challenge of coordinating those projects took an artistic toll on Pei. He found himself responsible for acquiring new building contracts and supervising the plans for them. As a result, he felt disconnected from the actual creative work. "Design is something you have to put your hand to," he said. "While my people had the luxury of doing one job at a time, I had to keep track of the whole enterprise." Pei's dissatisfaction reached its peak at a time when financial problems began plaguing Zeckendorf's firm. I. M. Pei and Associates officially broke from Webb and Knapp in 1960, which benefited Pei creatively but pained him personally. He had developed a close friendship with Zeckendorf, and both men were sad to part ways.

=== NCAR and related projects ===
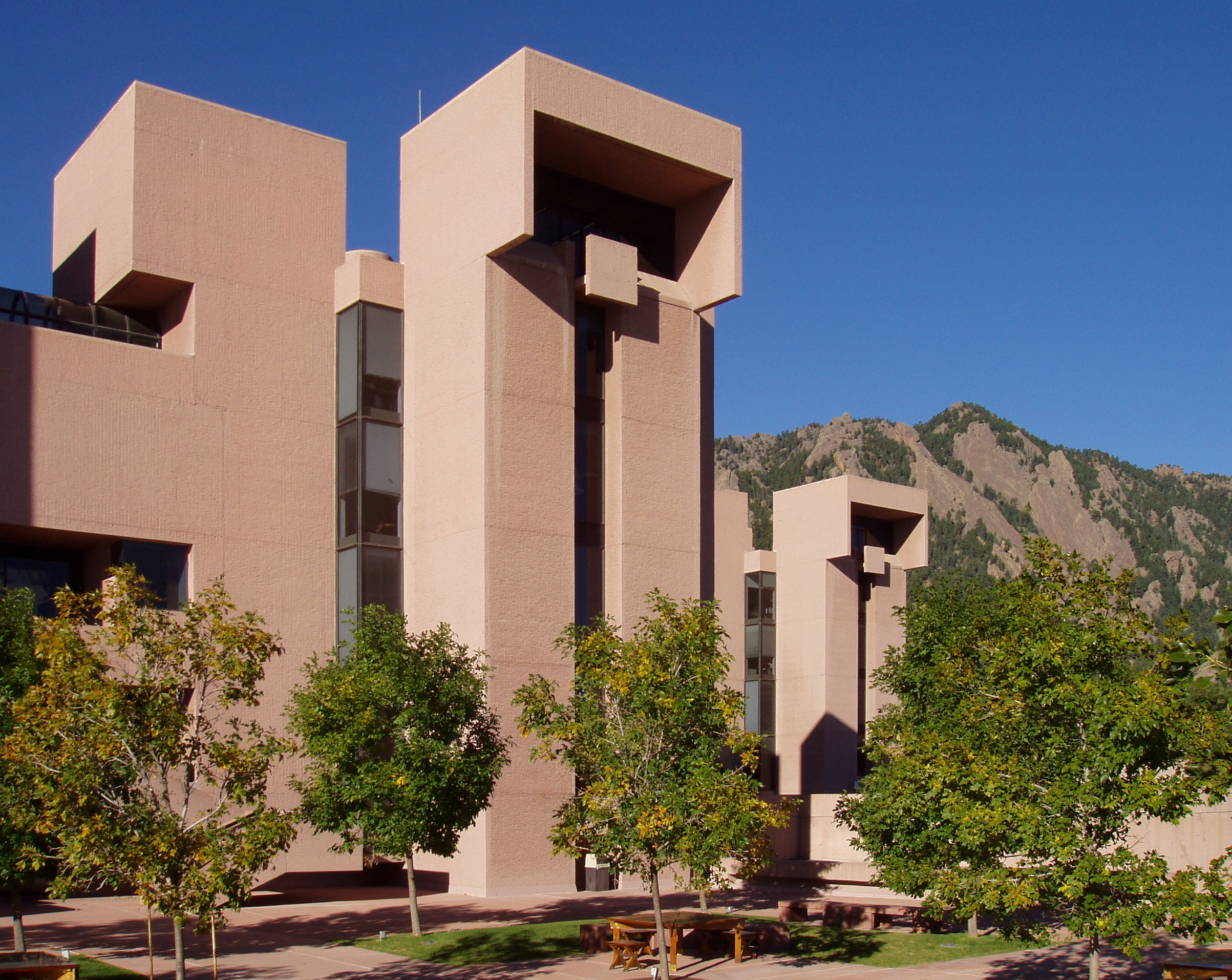
Pei said he wanted the Mesa Laboratory of the National Center for Atmospheric Research to look "as if it were carved out of the mountain".

Pei was able to return to hands-on design when he was approached in 1961 by Walter Orr Roberts to design the new Mesa Laboratory for the National Center for Atmospheric Research outside Boulder, Colorado. The project differed from Pei's earlier urban work because it rested in an open area in the foothills of the Rocky Mountains. He drove around the region with his wife, visiting assorted buildings and surveying the natural environs. He was impressed by the United States Air Force Academy in Colorado Springs, but felt it was "detached from nature".

The conceptualization stages were important for Pei, presenting a need and an opportunity to break from the Bauhaus tradition. He later recalled the long periods of time he spent in the area: "I recalled the places I had seen with my mother when I was a little boy—the mountaintop Buddhist retreats. There in the Colorado mountains, I tried to listen to the silence again—just as my mother had taught me. The investigation of the place became a kind of religious experience for me." Pei also drew inspiration from the Mesa Verde cliff dwellings of the Ancestral Puebloans; he wanted the buildings to exist in harmony with their natural surroundings. To this end, he called for a rock-treatment process that could color the buildings to match the nearby mountains. He also set the complex back on the mesa overlooking the city, and designed the approaching road to be long, winding, and indirect.

Roberts disliked Pei's initial designs, referring to them as "just a bunch of towers". Roberts intended his comments as typical of scientific experimentation, rather than artistic critique, but Pei was frustrated. His second attempt, however, fitted Roberts' vision perfectly: a spaced-out series of clustered buildings, joined by lower structures and complemented by two underground levels. The complex used many elements of cubist design, and the walkways were arranged to increase the probability of casual encounters among colleagues.

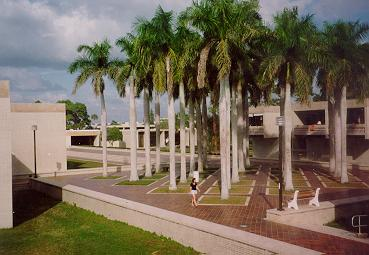
As with NCAR, Pei combined elements of cubism and natural harmony when designing the dormitories at New College of Florida in the mid-1960s.

Once the laboratory was built, several problems with its construction became apparent. Leaks in the roof caused difficulties for researchers, and the shifting of clay soil beneath the building caused cracks which were expensive to repair. Still, both architect and project manager were pleased with the final result. Pei referred to the NCAR complex as his "breakout building", and he remained a friend of Roberts until the scientist died in March 1990.

The success of NCAR brought renewed attention to Pei's design acumen. He was recruited to work on a variety of projects, including the S. I. Newhouse School of Public Communications at Syracuse University, the Everson Museum of Art in Syracuse, New York, the Sundrome terminal at John F. Kennedy International Airport in New York City, and dormitories at New College of Florida.

=== Kennedy Library ===
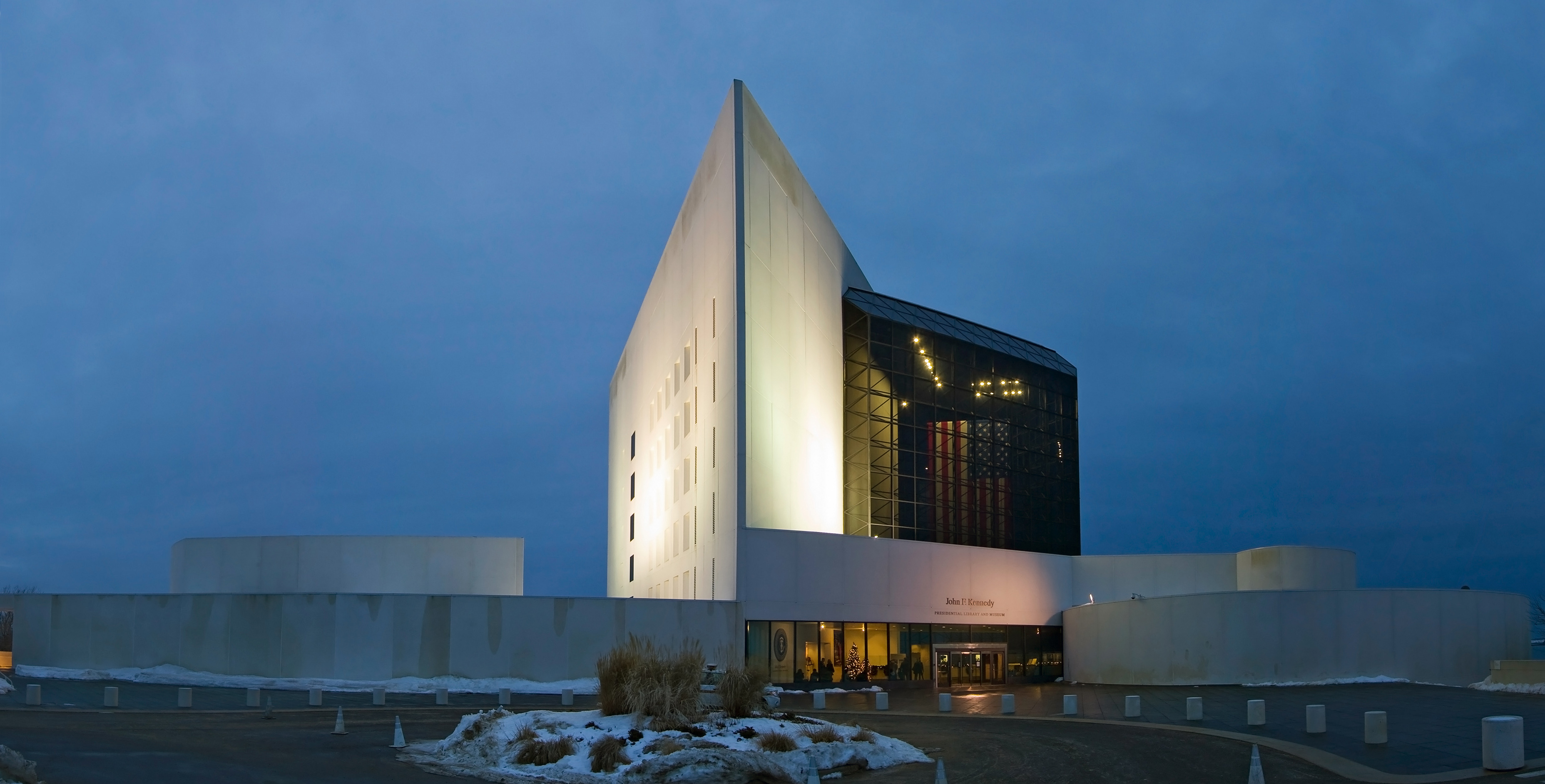
Pei considered the John F. Kennedy Library "the most important commission" in his life.

After President John F. Kennedy was assassinated in November 1963, his family and friends discussed constructing a library that would serve as a fitting memorial. A committee was formed to advise Kennedy's widow Jacqueline, who would make the final decision. The group deliberated for months and considered many famous architects. Eventually, Kennedy chose Pei to design the library, based on two considerations. First, she appreciated the variety of ideas he had used for earlier projects. "He didn't seem to have just one way to solve a problem," she said. "He seemed to approach each commission thinking only of it and then develop a way to make something beautiful." Ultimately, however, Kennedy made her choice based on her personal connection with Pei. Calling it "really an emotional decision", she explained: "He was so full of promise, like Jack; they were born in the same year. I decided it would be fun to take a great leap with him."

The project was plagued with problems from the outset. President Kennedy had begun considering the structure of his library soon after taking office, and he wanted to include archives from his administration, a museum of personal items, and a political science institute. After the assassination, the list expanded to include a fitting memorial tribute to the slain president. The variety of necessary inclusions complicated the design process and caused significant delays.

Pei's first proposed design included a large glass pyramid that would fill the interior with sunlight, meant to represent the optimism and hope that Kennedy's administration had symbolized for so many in the United States. Mrs. Kennedy liked the design, but resistance began in Cambridge, the first proposed site for the building, as soon as the project was announced. Many community members worried that the library would become a tourist attraction, causing particular problems with traffic congestion. Others worried that the design would clash with the architectural feel of nearby Harvard Square. By the mid-1970s, Pei tried proposing a new design, but the library's opponents resisted every effort. These events pained Pei, who had sent all three of his sons to Harvard, and although he rarely discussed his frustration, it was evident to his wife. "I could tell how tired he was by the way he opened the door at the end of the day," she said. "His footsteps were dragging. It was very hard for I. M. to see that so many people didn't want the building."

Finally the project moved to Columbia Point, near the University of Massachusetts Boston. The new site was less than ideal; it was located on an old landfill, and just over a large sewage pipe. Pei's architectural team added more fill to cover the pipe and developed an elaborate ventilation system to conquer the odor. A new design was unveiled, combining a large square glass-enclosed atrium with a triangular tower and a circular walkway.

The John F. Kennedy Presidential Library and Museum was dedicated on October 20, 1979. Critics generally liked the finished building, but the architect himself was unsatisfied. The years of conflict and compromise had changed the nature of the design, and Pei felt that the final result lacked its original passion. "I wanted to give something very special to the memory of President Kennedy," he said in 2000. "It could and should have been a great project." Pei's work on the Kennedy project boosted his reputation as an architect of note.

=== "Pei Plan" in Oklahoma City ===
The Pei Plan was a failed urban redevelopment initiative designed for downtown Oklahoma City, Oklahoma, in 1964. The plan called for the demolition of hundreds of old downtown structures in favor of renewed parking, office building, and retail developments, in addition to public projects such as the Myriad Convention Center and the Myriad Botanical Gardens. It was the dominant template for downtown development in Oklahoma City from its inception through the 1970s. The plan generated mixed results and opinion, largely succeeding in re-developing office building and parking infrastructure but failing to attract its anticipated retail and residential development. Significant public resentment also developed as a result of the destruction of multiple historic structures. As a result, Oklahoma City's leadership avoided large-scale urban planning for downtown throughout the 1980s and early 1990s, until the passage of the Metropolitan Area Projects (MAPS) initiative in 1993.

=== Providence's Cathedral Square ===
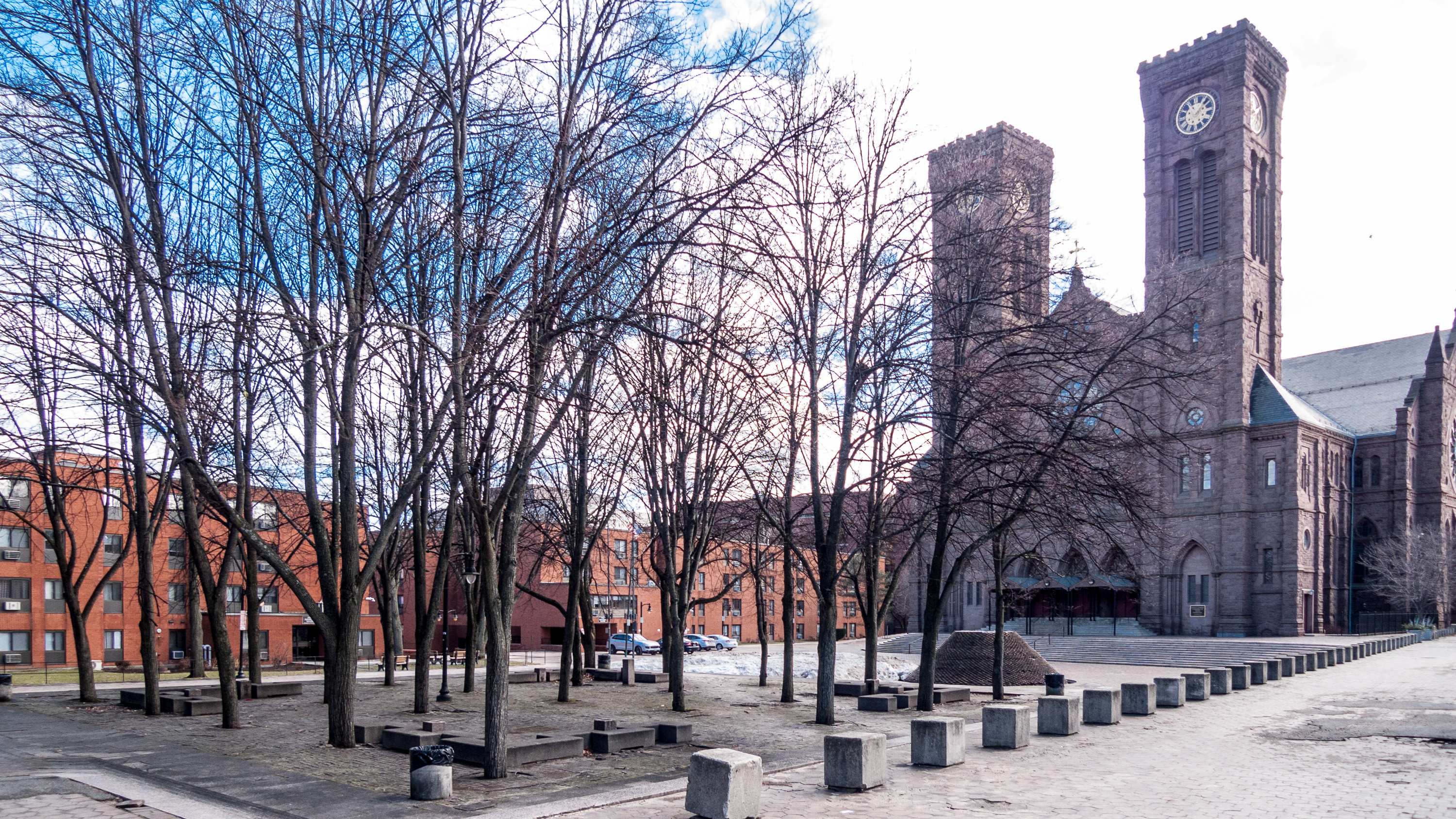
Providence's Cathedral Square, modeled after the Greek Agora marketplace

Another city which turned to Pei for urban renewal during this time was Providence, Rhode Island. In the late 1960s, Providence hired Pei to redesign Cathedral Square, a once-bustling civic center which had become neglected and empty, as part of an ambitious larger plan to redesign downtown. Pei's new plaza, modeled after the Greek Agora marketplace, opened in 1972. The city ran out of money before Pei's vision could be fully realized. Also, recent construction of a low-income housing complex and Interstate 95 had changed the neighborhood's character permanently. In 1974, The Providence Evening Bulletin called Pei's new plaza a "conspicuous failure". By 2016, media reports characterized the plaza as a neglected, little-visited "hidden gem".

=== Augusta, Georgia ===
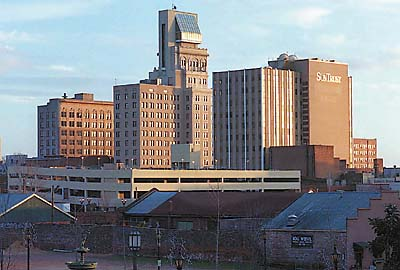
The distinctive modern pyramid shaped penthouse, designed by Pei, that was added to the top of the historic Lamar Building in 1976

In 1974, the city of Augusta, Georgia turned to Pei and his firm for downtown revitalization. The Chamber of Commerce building and Bicentennial Park were completed from his plan. In 1976, Pei designed a distinctive modern penthouse that was added to the roof of architect William Lee Stoddart's historic Lamar Building, designed in 1916. In 1980, Pei and his company designed the Augusta Civic Center, now known as the James Brown Arena.

=== Dallas City Hall ===
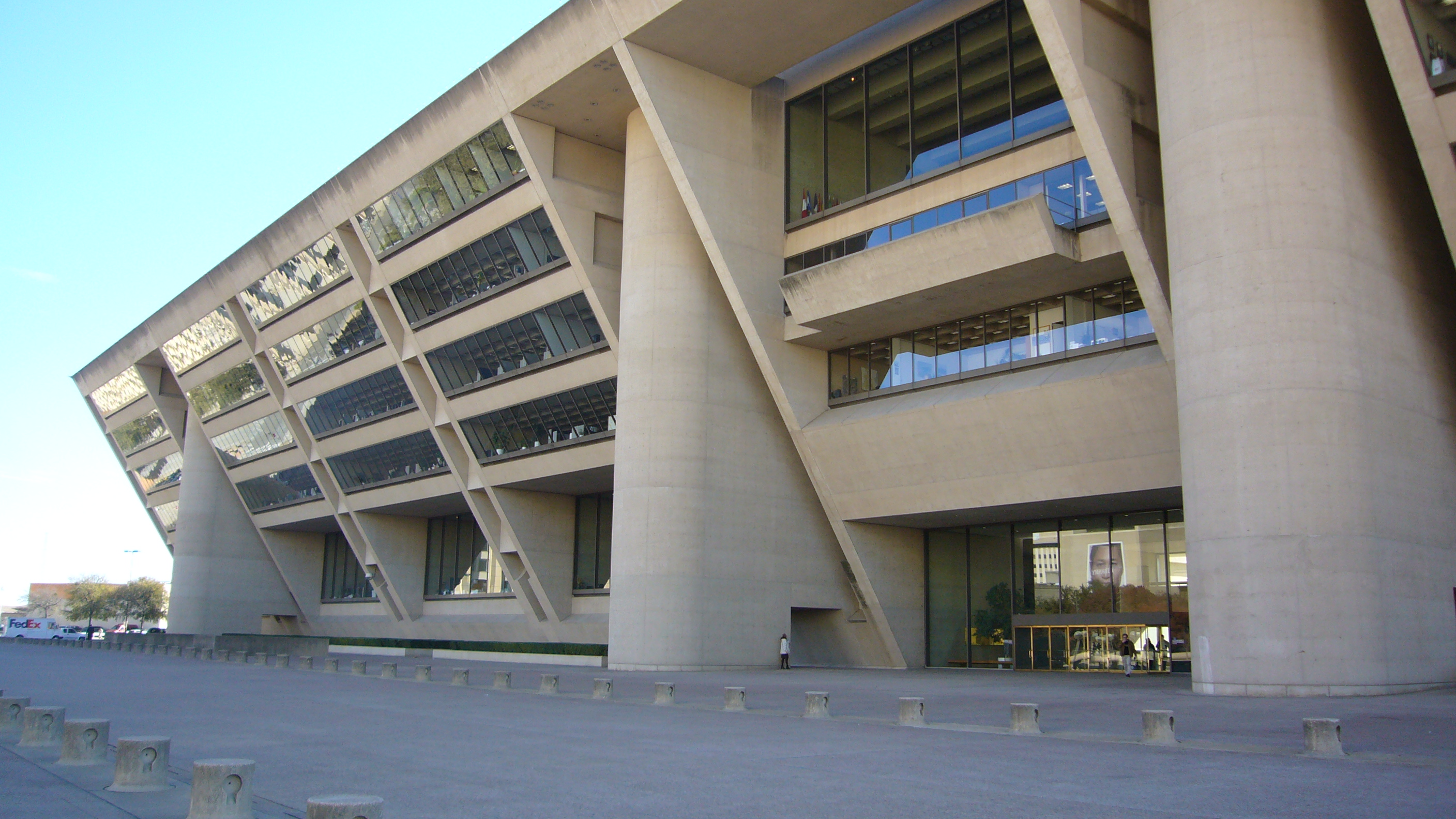
Pei wanted his design for Dallas City Hall to "convey an image of the people".

Kennedy's assassination also led indirectly to another commission for Pei's firm. In 1964 the acting mayor of Dallas, Erik Jonsson, began working to change the community's image. Dallas was known and disliked as the city where the president had been killed, but Jonsson began a program designed to initiate a community renewal. One of the goals was a new city hall, which could be a "symbol of the people". Jonsson, a co-founder of Texas Instruments, learned about Pei from his associate Cecil Howard Green, who had recruited the architect for MIT's Earth Sciences building.

Pei's approach to the new Dallas City Hall mirrored those of other projects; he surveyed the surrounding area and worked to make the building fit. In the case of Dallas, he spent days meeting with residents of the city and was impressed by their civic pride. He also found that the skyscrapers of the downtown business district dominated the skyline, and sought to create a building that could face the tall buildings and represent the importance of the public sector. He spoke of creating "a public-private dialogue with the commercial high-rises".

Working with his associate Theodore Musho, Pei developed a design centered on a building with a top much wider than the bottom; the facade leans at an angle of 34 degrees, which shades the building from the Texas sun. A plaza stretches out before the building, and a series of support columns holds it up. It was influenced by Le Corbusier's High Court building in Chandigarh, India; Pei sought to use the significant overhang to unify the building and plaza. The project cost much more than initially expected, and took 11 years to complete. Revenue was secured in part by including a subterranean parking garage. The interior of the city hall is large and spacious; windows in the ceiling above the eighth floor fill the main space with light.

The city of Dallas received the building well, and a local television news crew found unanimous approval of the new city hall when it officially opened to the public in 1978. Pei himself considered the project a success, even as he worried about the arrangement of its elements. He said: "It's perhaps stronger than I would have liked; it's got more strength than finesse." He felt that his relative lack of experience left him without the necessary design tools to refine his vision, but the community liked the city hall enough to invite him back. Over the years he went on to design five additional buildings in the Dallas area.

In October 2025, city leaders began discussing the future of the Dallas city hall building, including an estimated $100 million in estimated deferred maintenance and repairs needed, some of which are serious enough to threaten the building's structural integrity. Among the considerations is a plan to demolish the building and make way for a new arena for the Dallas Mavericks.

=== Hancock Tower, Boston ===
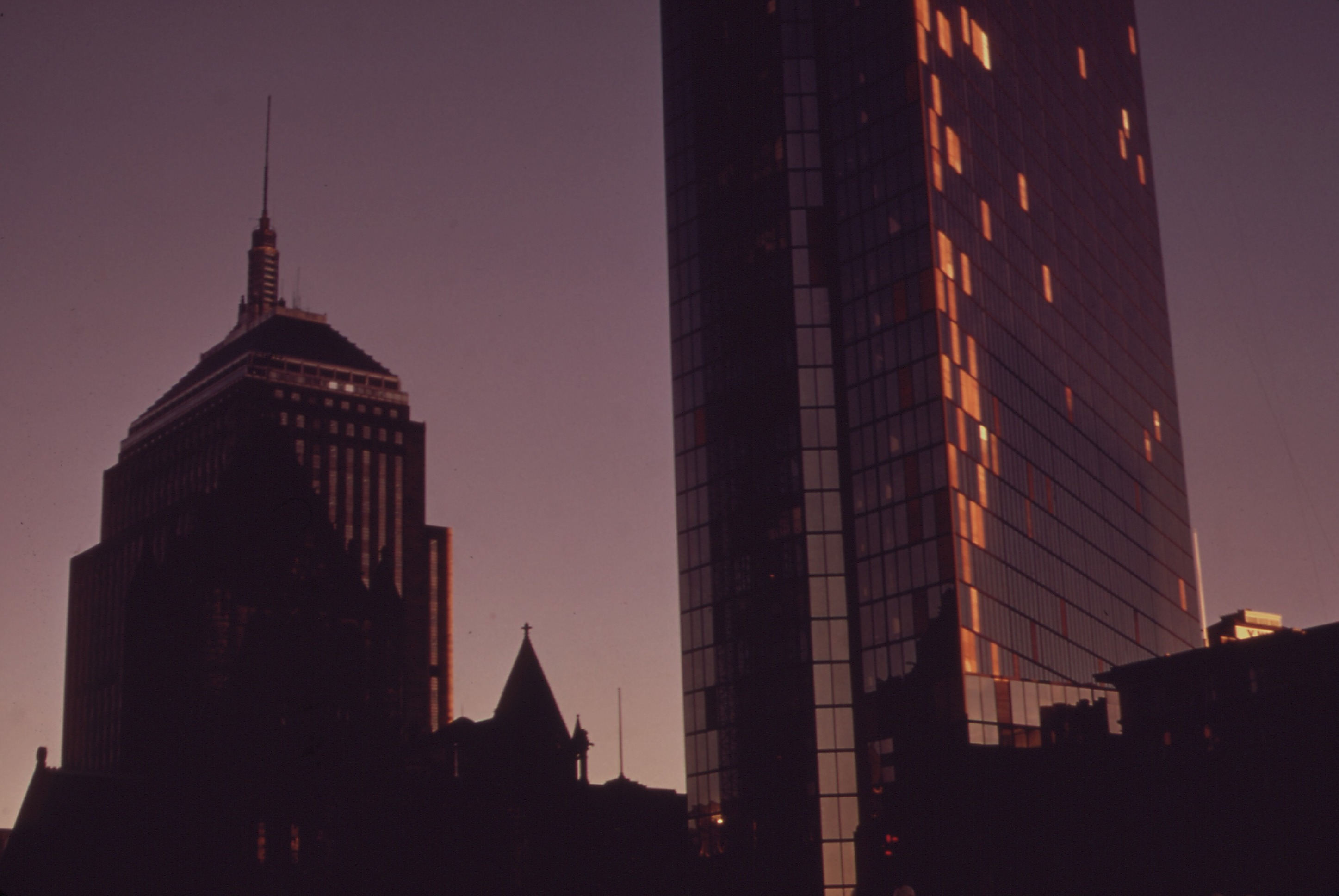
The disastrous failure of windows on the Hancock Tower required replacing them with plywood; some called it "the world's tallest wood building".

While Pei and Musho were coordinating the Dallas project, their associate Henry Cobb had taken the helm for a commission in Boston. John Hancock Insurance chairman Robert Slater hired I. M. Pei & Partners to design a building that could overshadow the Prudential Tower, erected by their rival.

After the firm's first plan was discarded due to a need for more office space, Cobb developed a new plan around a towering parallelogram, slanted away from the Trinity Church and accented by a wedge cut into each narrow side. To minimize the visual impact, the building was covered in large reflective glass panels; Cobb said this would make the building a "background and foil" to the older structures around it. When the Hancock Tower was finished in 1976, it was the tallest building in New England.

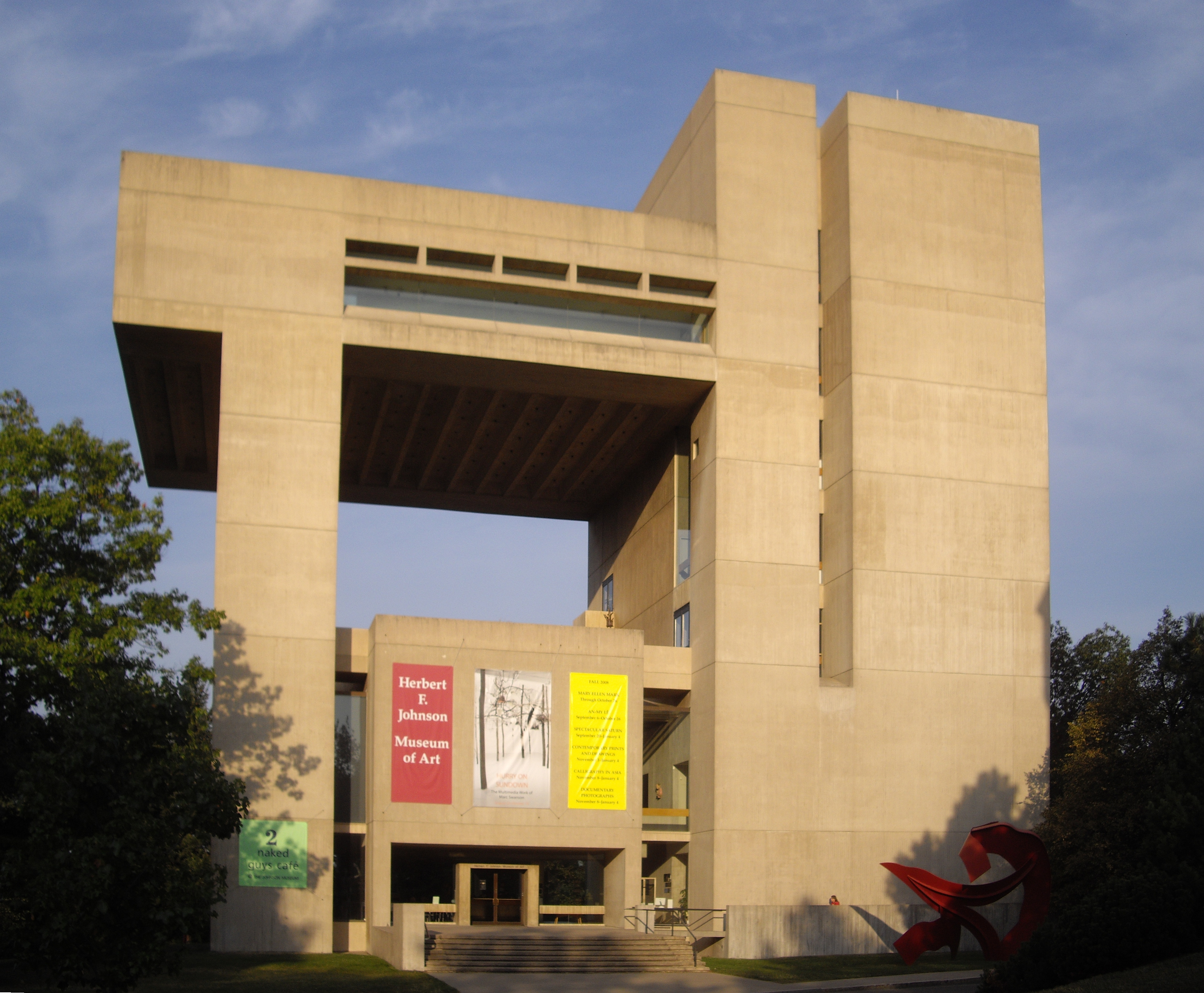
Herbert F. Johnson Museum of Art, Cornell University

Serious issues of execution became evident in the tower almost immediately. Many glass panels fractured in a windstorm during construction in 1973. Some detached and fell to the ground, causing no injuries but sparking concern among Boston residents. The entire tower was reglazed with smaller panels, significantly increasing costs. Hancock sued the glass manufacturers, Libbey-Owens-Ford, as well as I. M. Pei & Partners, for submitting plans that were "not good and workmanlike". LOF countersued Hancock for defamation, accusing Pei's firm of poor use of their materials; I. M. Pei & Partners sued LOF in return. All three companies settled out of court in 1981.

The project became an albatross for Pei's firm. Pei himself refused to discuss it for many years. The pace of new commissions slowed and the firm's architects began looking overseas for opportunities. Cobb worked in Australia and Pei took on jobs in Singapore, Iran, and Kuwait. Although it was a difficult time for everyone involved, Pei later reflected with patience on the experience. "Going through this trial toughened us," he said. "It helped to cement us as partners; we did not give up on each other."

=== National Gallery East Building, Washington, D.C. ===
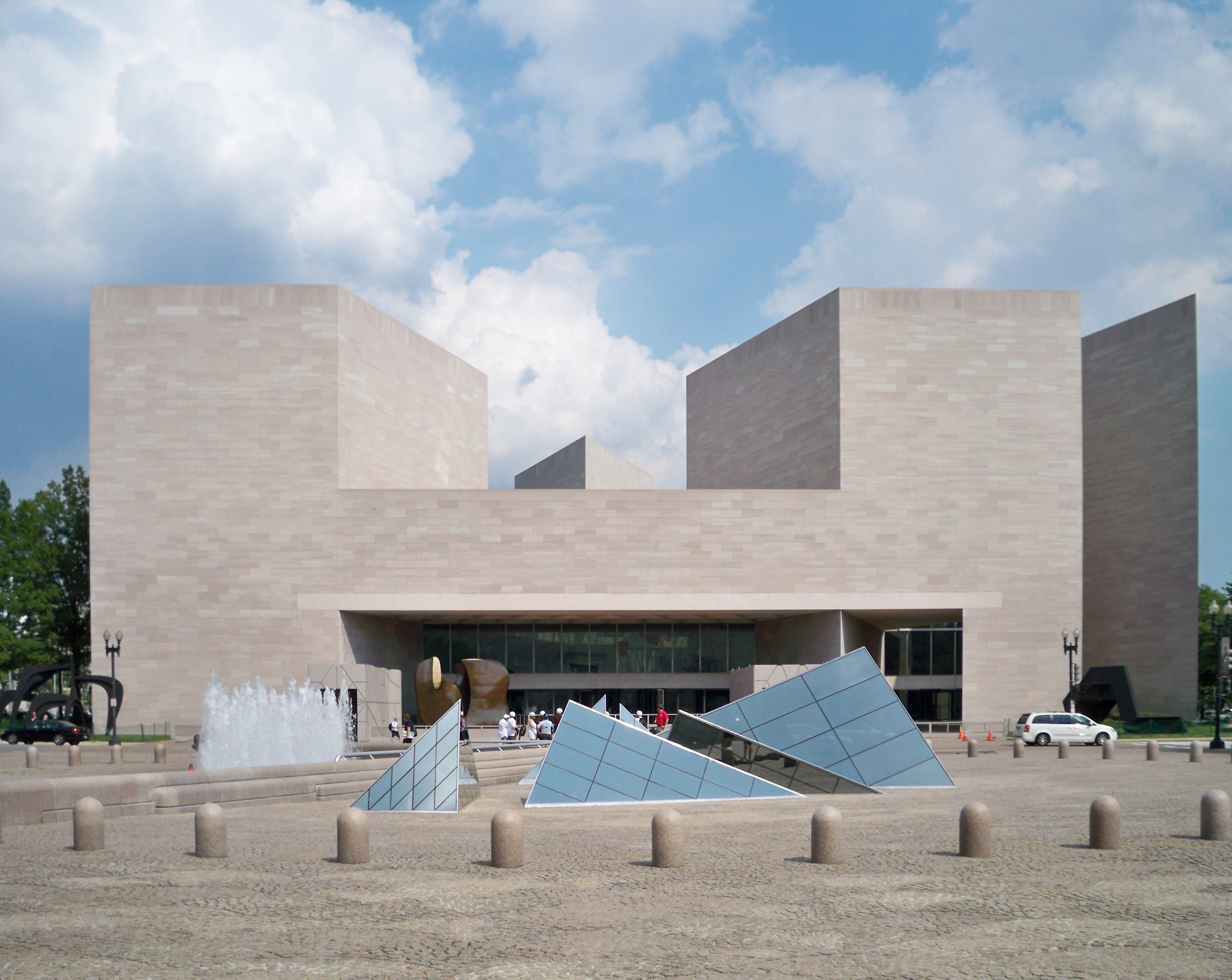
Time magazine headlined its review of Pei's design for the East Building "Masterpiece on the Mall".

In the mid-1960s, directors of the National Gallery of Art in Washington, D.C., declared the need for a new building. Paul Mellon, a primary benefactor of the gallery and a member of its building committee, set to work with his assistant J. Carter Brown (who became gallery director in 1969) to find an architect. The new structure would be located to the east of the original building, and tasked with two functions: offer a large space for public appreciation of various popular collections; and house office space as well as archives for scholarship and research. They likened the scope of the new facility to the Library of Alexandria. After inspecting Pei's work at the Des Moines Art Center in Iowa and the Johnson Museum at Cornell University, they offered him the commission.

Pei took to the project with vigor, and set to work with two young architects he had recently recruited to the firm, William Pedersen and Yann Weymouth. Their first obstacle was the unusual shape of the building site, a trapezoid of land at the intersection of Constitution and Pennsylvania Avenues. Inspiration struck Pei in 1968, when he scrawled a rough diagram of two triangles on a scrap of paper. The larger building would be the public gallery; the smaller would house offices and archives. This triangular shape became a singular vision for the architect. As the date for groundbreaking approached, Pedersen suggested to his boss that a slightly different approach would make construction easier. Pei simply smiled and said: "No compromises."

The growing popularity of art museums presented unique challenges to the architecture. Mellon and Pei both expected large crowds of people to visit the new building, and they planned accordingly. To this end, Pei designed a large lobby roofed with enormous skylights. Individual galleries are located along the periphery, allowing visitors to return after viewing each exhibit to the spacious main room. A large mobile sculpture by American artist Alexander Calder was later added to the lobby. Pei hoped the lobby would be exciting to the public in the same way as the central room of the Guggenheim Museum is in New York City. The modern museum, he said later, "must pay greater attention to its educational responsibility, especially to the young".

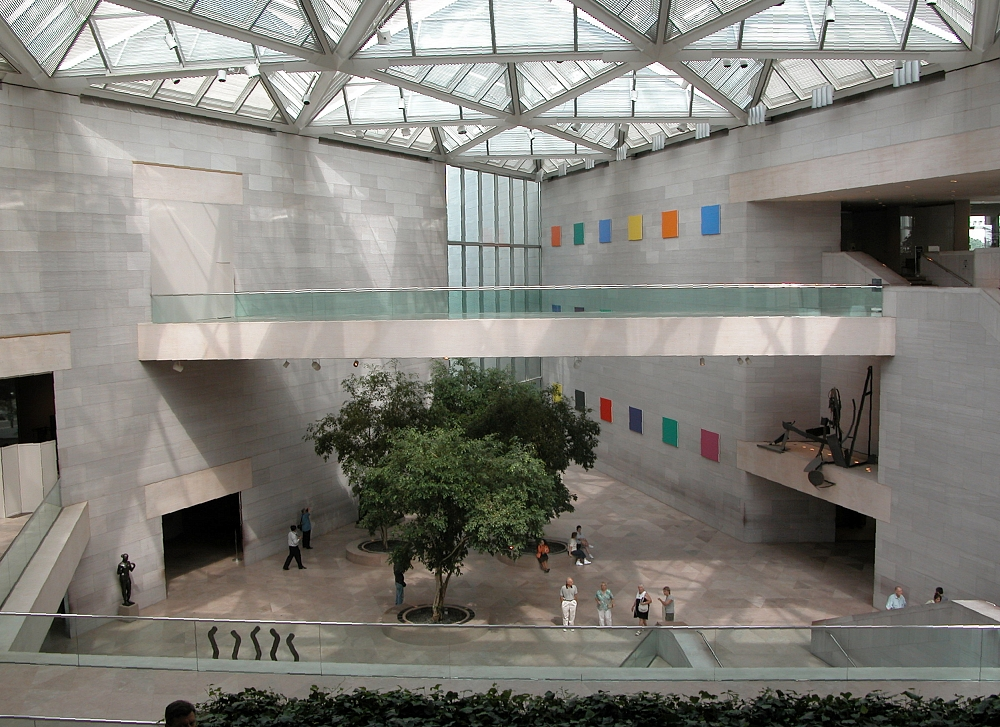
Critic Richard Hennessy complained in Artforum about the East Building's "shocking fun-house atmosphere".

Materials for the building's exterior were chosen with careful precision. To match the look and texture of the original gallery's marble walls, builders re-opened the quarry in Knoxville, Tennessee, from which the first batch of stone had been harvested. The project even found and hired Malcolm Rice, a quarry supervisor who had overseen the original 1941 gallery project. The marble was cut into three-inch-thick blocks and arranged over the concrete foundation, with darker blocks at the bottom and lighter blocks on top.

The East Building was honored on May 30, 1978, two days before its public unveiling, with a black-tie party attended by celebrities, politicians, benefactors, and artists. When the building opened, popular opinion was enthusiastic. Large crowds visited the new museum, and critics generally voiced their approval. Ada Louise Huxtable wrote in The New York Times that Pei's building was "a palatial statement of the creative accommodation of contemporary art and architecture". The sharp angle of the smaller building has been a particular note of praise for the public; over the years it has become stained and worn from the hands of visitors.

Some critics disliked the unusual design, however, and criticized the reliance on triangles throughout the building. Others took issue with the large main lobby, particularly its attempt to lure casual visitors. In his review for Artforum, critic Richard Hennessy described a "shocking fun-house atmosphere" and "aura of ancient Roman patronage". One of the earliest and most vocal critics, however, came to appreciate the new gallery once he saw it in person. Allan Greenberg had scorned the design when it was first unveiled, but wrote later to J. Carter Brown: "I am forced to admit that you are right and I was wrong! The building is a masterpiece."

=== Fragrant Hills, China ===
After U.S. President Richard Nixon made his famous 1972 visit to China, a wave of exchanges took place between the two countries. One of these was a delegation of the American Institute of Architects in 1974, which Pei joined. It was his first trip back to China since leaving in 1935. He was favorably received, returned the welcome with positive comments, and a series of lectures ensued. Pei noted in one lecture that since the 1950s Chinese architects had been content to imitate Western styles; he urged his audience in one lecture to search China's native traditions for inspiration.

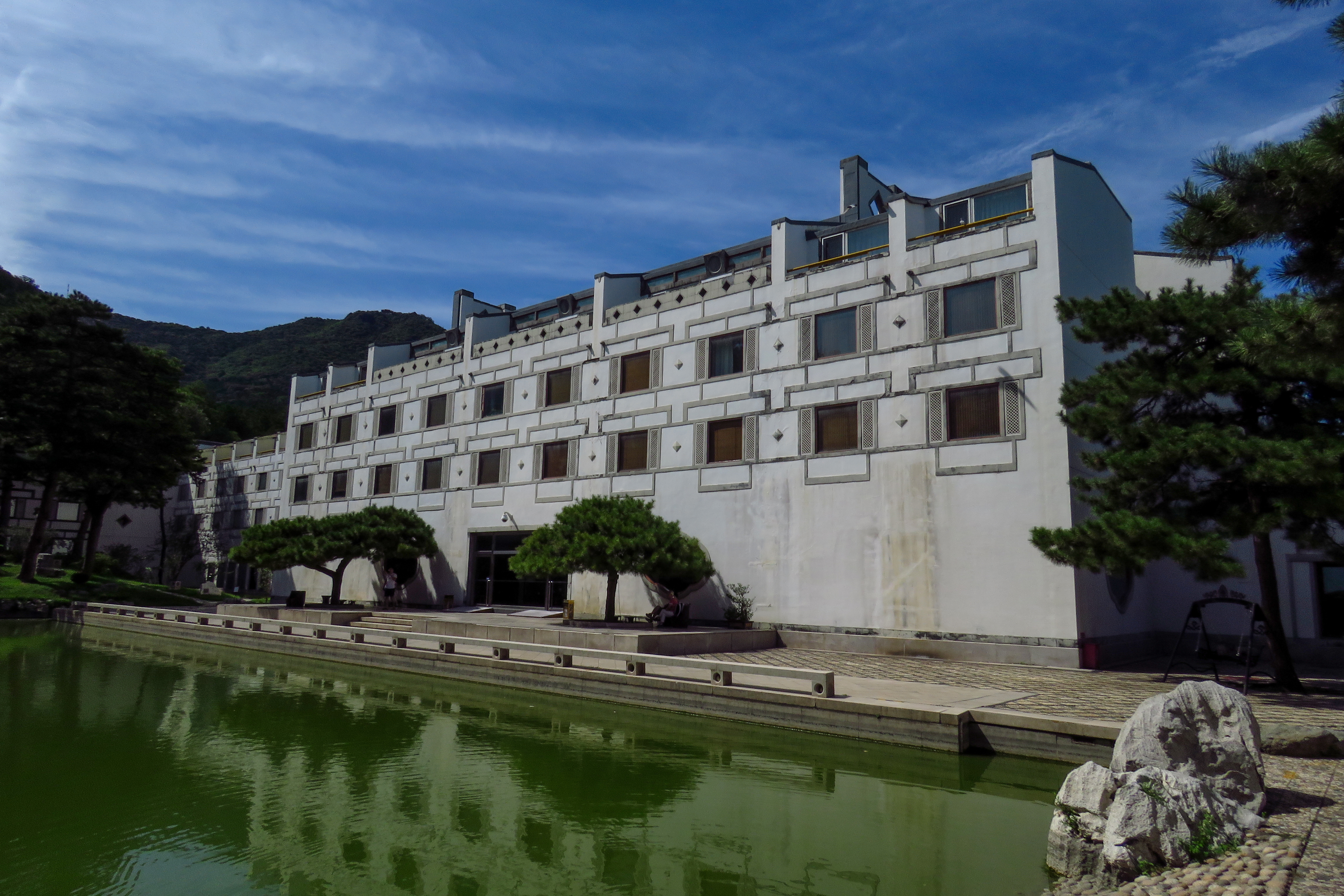
Pei was surprised by public resistance to his traditional design of the hotel at Fragrant Hills in China. "Many people thought I was being reactionary," he said.

In 1978, Pei was asked to initiate a project for his home country. After surveying a number of different locations, Pei fell in love with a valley that had once served as an imperial garden and hunting preserve known as Fragrant Hills. The site housed a decrepit hotel; Pei was invited to tear it down and build a new one. As usual, he approached the project by carefully considering the context and purpose. Likewise, he considered modernist styles inappropriate for the setting. Thus, he said, it was necessary to find "a third way".

After visiting his ancestral home in Suzhou, Pei created a design based on some simple but nuanced techniques he admired in traditional residential Chinese buildings. Among these were abundant gardens, integration with nature, and consideration of the relationship between enclosure and opening. Pei's design included a large central atrium covered by glass panels that functioned much like the large central space in his East Building of the National Gallery. Openings of various shapes in walls invited guests to view the natural scenery beyond. Younger Chinese who had hoped the building would exhibit some of Cubist flavor for which Pei had become known were disappointed, but the new hotel found more favor with government officials and architects.

The hotel, with 325 guest rooms and a four-story central atrium, was designed to fit perfectly into its natural habitat. The trees in the area were of special concern, and particular care was taken to cut down as few as possible. He worked with an expert from Suzhou to preserve and renovate a water maze from the original hotel, one of only five in the country. Pei was also meticulous about the arrangement of items in the garden behind the hotel; he even insisted on transporting 230 short tons (210 t) of rocks from a location in southwest China to suit the natural aesthetic. An associate of Pei's said later that he never saw the architect so involved in a project.

During construction, a series of mistakes collided with the nation's lack of technology to strain relations between architects and builders. Whereas 200 or so workers might have been used for a similar building in the US, the Fragrant Hill project employed over 3,000 workers. This was mostly because the construction company lacked the sophisticated machines used elsewhere. The problems continued for months, until Pei had an uncharacteristically emotional moment during a meeting with Chinese officials. He later explained that his actions included "shouting and pounding the table" in frustration. The design staff noticed a difference in the manner of work among the crew after the meeting. As the opening neared, however, Pei found the hotel still needed work. He began scrubbing floors with his wife and ordered his children to make beds and vacuum floors. The project's difficulties took an emotional and physical strain on the Pei family.

The Fragrant Hill Hotel opened on October 17, 1982, but quickly fell into disrepair. A member of Pei's staff returned for a visit several years later and confirmed the dilapidated condition of the hotel. He and Pei attributed this to the country's general unfamiliarity with deluxe buildings. The Chinese architectural community at the time gave the structure little attention, as their interest at the time centered on the work of American postmodernists such as Michael Graves.

=== Javits Center, New York ===
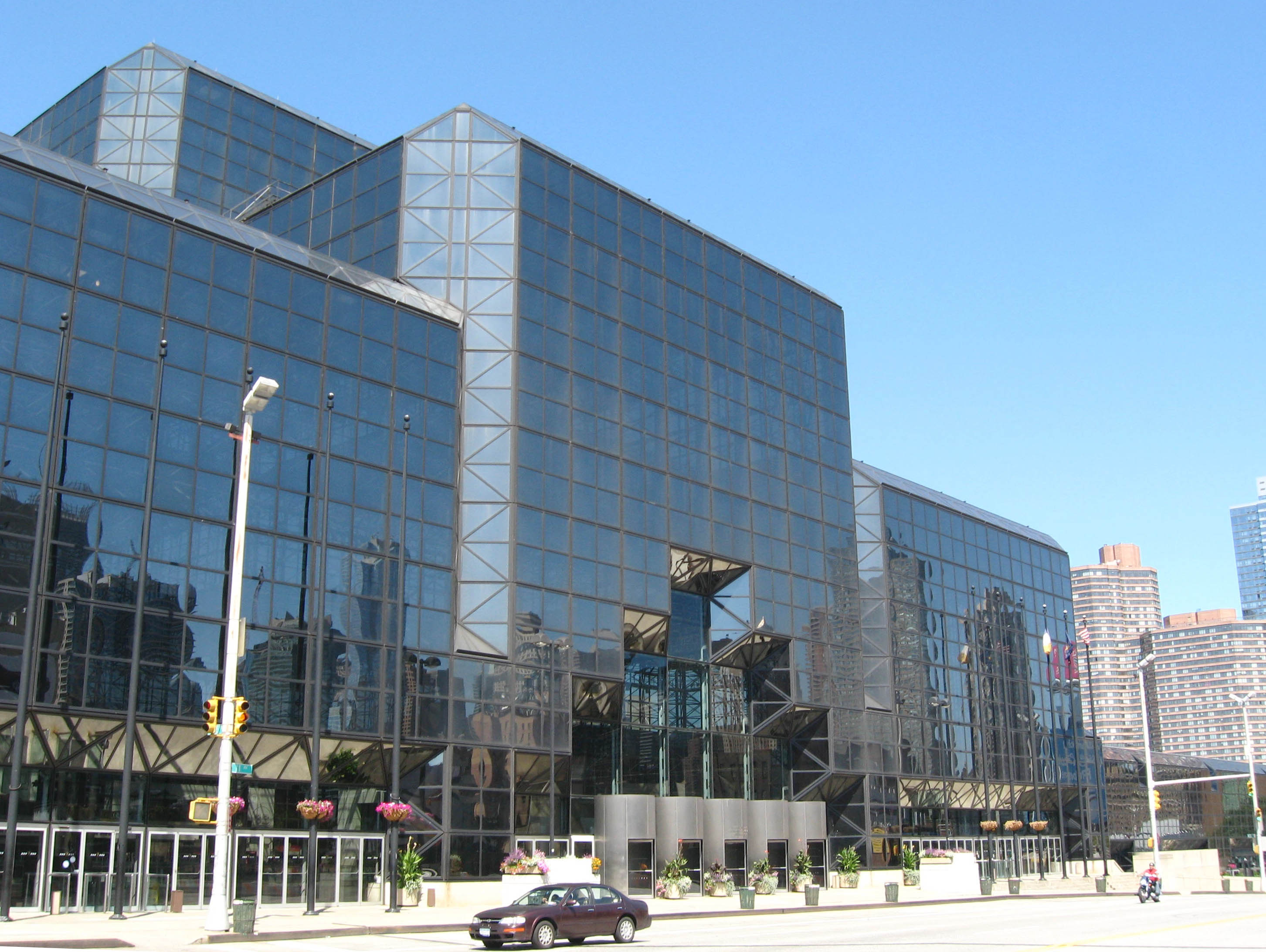
Pei said of the Javits Center: "The complications exceeded even my expectations."

As the Fragrant Hill project neared completion, Pei began work on the Javits Center in New York City, for which his associate James Freed served as lead designer. Hoping to create a vibrant community institution in what was then a run-down neighborhood on Manhattan's west side, Freed developed a glass-coated structure with an intricate space frame of interconnected metal rods and spheres.

The convention center was plagued from the start by budget problems and construction blunders. City regulations forbid a general contractor having final authority over the project, so architects and program manager Richard Kahan had to coordinate the wide array of builders, plumbers, electricians, and other workers. The forged steel globes to be used in the space frame came to the site with hairline cracks and other defects: 12,000 were rejected. These and other problems led to media comparisons with the disastrous Hancock Tower. One New York City official blamed Kahan for the difficulties, indicating that the building's architectural flourishes were responsible for delays and financial crises. The Javits Center opened on April 3, 1986, to a generally positive reception.

=== Grand Louvre, Paris ===
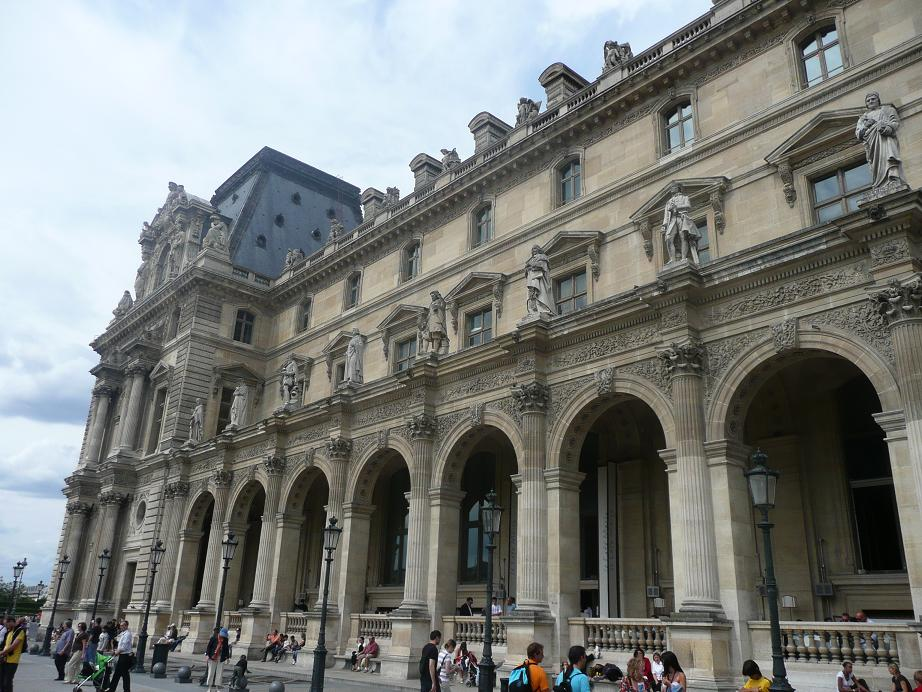
Pei was acutely aware, as he said, that "the history of Paris was embedded in the stones of the Louvre."

When François Mitterrand was elected President of France in 1981, he laid out an ambitious plan for a variety of construction projects. One of these was the renovation of the Louvre. Mitterrand appointed a civil servant named Émile Biasini to oversee it. After visiting museums in Europe and the United States, including the U.S. National Gallery, he asked Pei to join the team. The architect made three secretive trips to Paris, to determine the feasibility of the project; only one museum employee knew why he was there. Pei finally agreed that a new construction project was not only possible, but necessary for the future of the museum. He thus became the first foreign architect to work on the Louvre.

The heart of the new design included not only a renovation of the Cour Napoléon in the midst of the buildings, but also a transformation of the interiors. Pei proposed a central entrance, not unlike the lobby of the National Gallery East Building, which would link the three major wings around the central space. Below would be a complex of additional floors for research, storage, and maintenance purposes. At the center of the courtyard he designed a glass and steel pyramid, first proposed with the Kennedy Library, to serve as entrance and anteroom skylight. It was mirrored by an inverted pyramid to the west, to reflect sunlight into the complex. These designs were partly an homage to the fastidious geometry of the French landscape architect André Le Nôtre. Pei also found the pyramid shape best suited for stable transparency, and considered it "most compatible with the architecture of the Louvre, especially with the faceted planes of its roofs".

Biasini and Mitterrand liked the plans, but the scope of the renovation displeased Louvre administrator André Chabaud. He resigned from his post, complaining that the project was "unfeasible" and posed "architectural risks". Some sections of the French public also reacted harshly to the design, mostly because of the proposed pyramid. One critic called it a "gigantic, ruinous gadget"; another charged Mitterrand with "despotism" for inflicting Paris with the "atrocity". Pei estimated that 90 percent of Parisians opposed his design. "I received many angry glances in the streets of Paris," he said. Some condemnations carried nationalistic overtones. One opponent wrote: "I am surprised that one would go looking for a Chinese architect in America to deal with the historic heart of the capital of France."

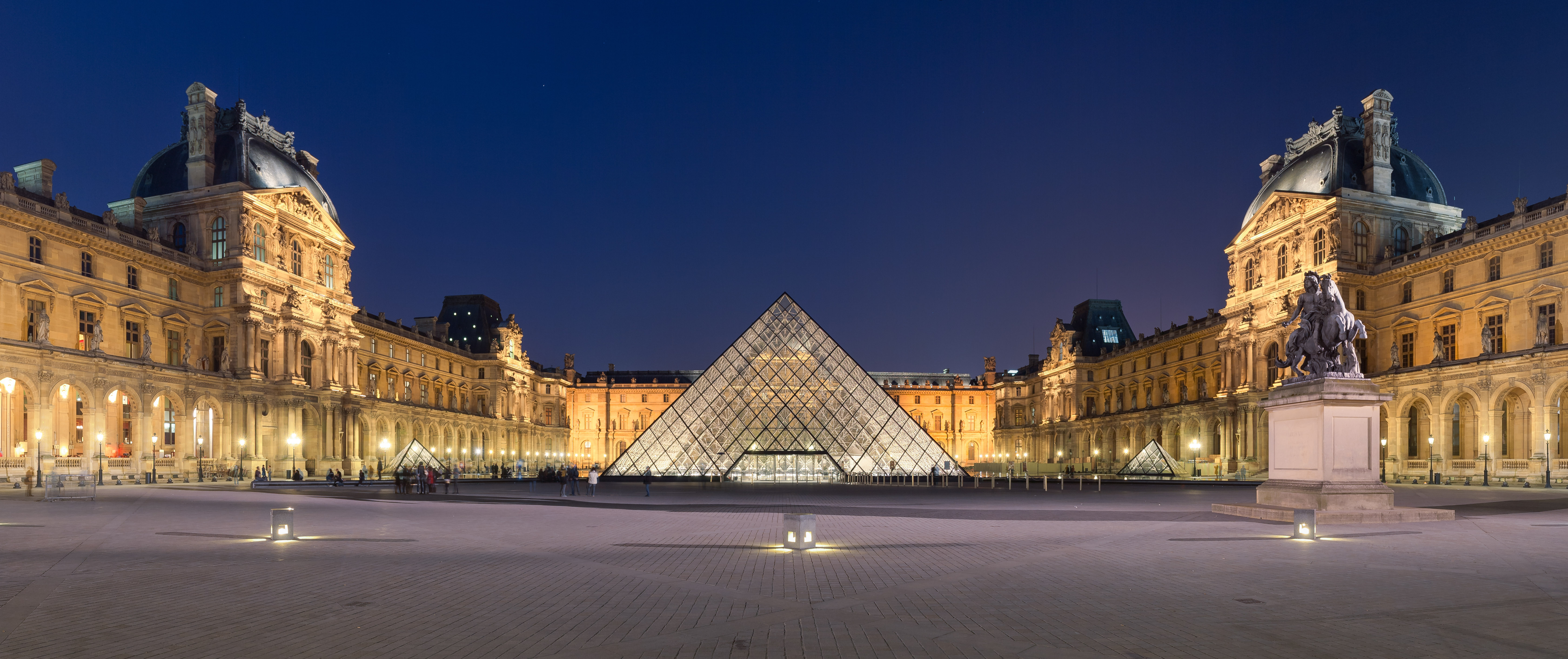
Pei decided that a pyramid was "most compatible" with the other structures at the Louvre, complementing their roofs' faceted planes.

Soon, however, Pei and his team won the support of several key cultural icons, including the conductor Pierre Boulez and Claude Pompidou, widow of former French President Georges Pompidou, after whom the similarly controversial Centre Georges Pompidou was named. In an attempt to soothe public ire, Pei took a suggestion from then-mayor of Paris Jacques Chirac and placed a full-sized cable model of the pyramid in the courtyard. During the four days of its exhibition, an estimated 60,000 people visited the site. Some critics eased their opposition after witnessing the proposed scale of the pyramid.

Pei demanded a method of glass production that resulted in clear panes. The pyramid was constructed at the same time as the subterranean levels below, which caused difficulties during the building stages. As they worked, construction teams came upon an abandoned set of rooms containing 25,000 historical items; these were incorporated into the rest of the structure to add a new exhibition zone.

The new Cour Napoléon was opened to the public on October 14, 1988, and the Pyramid entrance was opened the following March. By this time, public opposition had softened; a poll found a 56 percent approval rating for the pyramid, with 23 percent still opposed. The newspaper Le Figaro had vehemently criticized Pei's design, but later celebrated the tenth anniversary of its magazine supplement at the pyramid. Prince Charles of Britain surveyed the new site with curiosity, and declared it "marvelous, very exciting". A writer in Le Quotidien de Paris wrote: "The much-feared pyramid has become adorable."

The experience was exhausting for Pei, but also rewarding. "After the Louvre," he said later, "I thought no project would be too difficult." The pyramid achieved further widespread international recognition for its central role in the plot at the denouement of The Da Vinci Code by Dan Brown and its appearance in the final scene of the subsequent screen adaptation. The Louvre Pyramid became Pei's most famous structure.

=== Meyerson Symphony Center, Dallas ===
The opening of the Louvre Pyramid coincided with four other projects on which Pei had been working, prompting architecture critic Paul Goldberger to declare 1989 "the year of Pei" in The New York Times. It was also the year in which Pei's firm changed its name to Pei Cobb Freed & Partners, to reflect the increasing stature and prominence of his associates. At the age of 72, Pei had begun thinking about retirement, but continued working long hours to see his designs come to light.

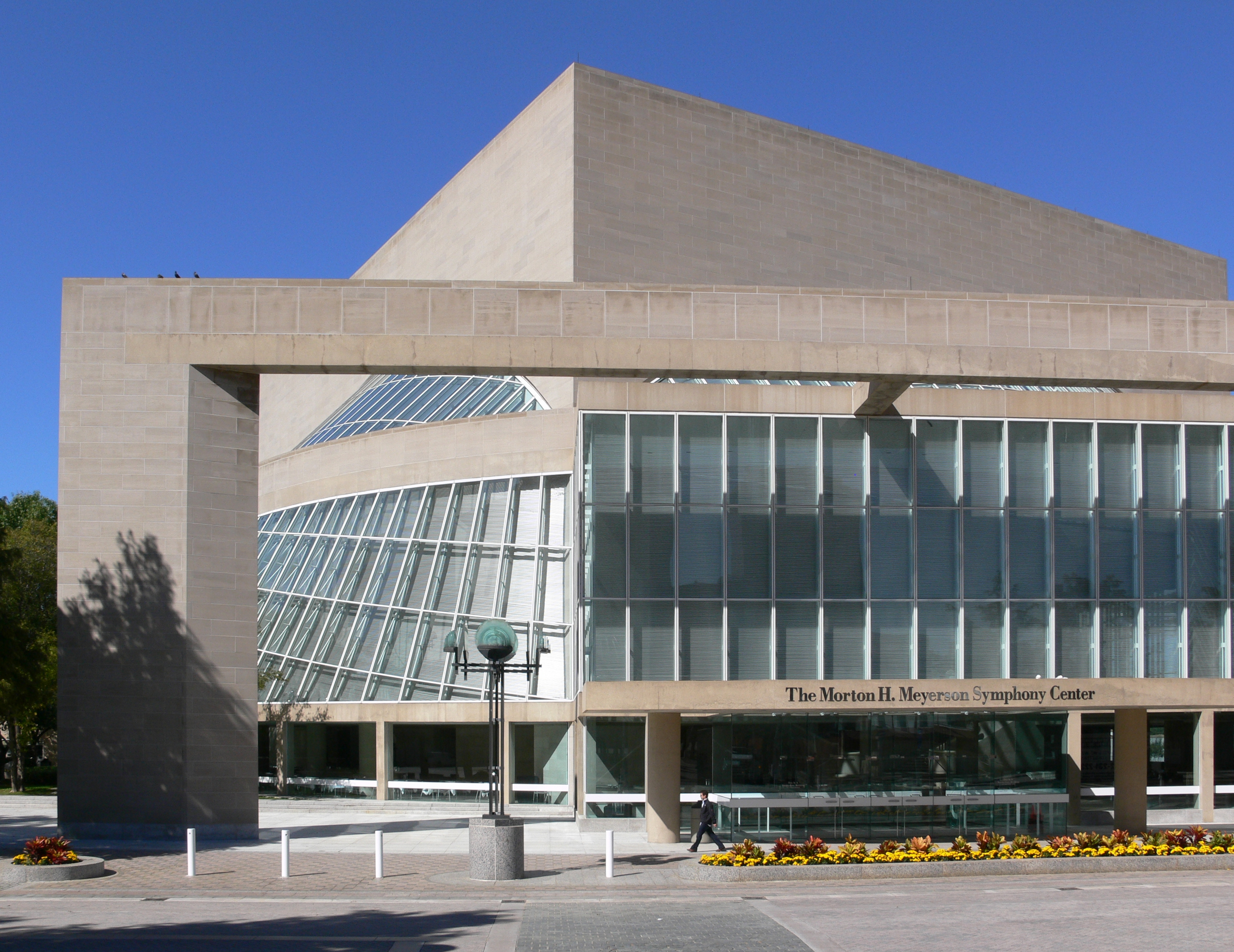
Although he usually designed entirely by hand, Pei used a computer to "confirm the spaces" for the Morton H. Meyerson Symphony Center in Dallas.

One of the projects took Pei back to Dallas, Texas, to design the Morton H. Meyerson Symphony Center. The success of city's performing artists, particularly the Dallas Symphony Orchestra then led by conductor Eduardo Mata, led to interest by city leaders in creating a modern center for musical arts that could rival the best halls in Europe. The organizing committee contacted 45 architects, but at first Pei did not respond, thinking that his work on the Dallas City Hall had left a negative impression. One of his colleagues from that project, however, insisted that he meet with the committee. He did and, although it would be his first concert hall, the committee voted unanimously to offer him the commission. As one member put it: "We were convinced that we would get the world's greatest architect putting his best foot forward."

Because its main purpose was the presentation of live music, the hall needed a design focused on acoustics first, then public access and exterior aesthetics. To this end, a professional sound technician was hired to design the interior. He proposed a shoebox auditorium, used in the acclaimed designs of top European symphony halls such as the Amsterdam Concertgebouw and Vienna Musikverein. Pei drew inspiration for his adjustments from the designs of the German architect Johann Balthasar Neumann, especially the Basilica of the Fourteen Holy Helpers. He also sought to incorporate some of the panache of the Paris Opéra designed by Charles Garnier.

Pei's design placed the rigid shoebox at an angle to the surrounding street grid, connected at the north end to a long rectangular office building, and cut through the middle with an assortment of circles and cones. The design attempted to reproduce with modern features the acoustic and visual functions of traditional elements like filigree. The project was risky: its goals were ambitious and any unforeseen acoustic flaws would be virtually impossible to remedy after the hall's completion. Pei admitted that he did not completely know how everything would come together. "I can imagine only 60 percent of the space in this building," he said during the early stages. "The rest will be as surprising to me as to everyone else." As the project developed, costs rose steadily and some sponsors considered withdrawing their support. Billionaire tycoon Ross Perot made a donation of US$10 million, on the condition that it be named in honor of Morton H. Meyerson, the longtime patron of the arts in Dallas.

The building opened and immediately garnered widespread praise, especially for its acoustics. After attending a week of performances in the hall, a music critic for The New York Times wrote an enthusiastic account of the experience and congratulated the architects. One of Pei's associates told him during a party before the opening that the symphony hall was "a very mature building"; he smiled and replied: "Ah, but did I have to wait this long?"

=== Bank of China, Hong Kong ===
A new offer had arrived for Pei from the Chinese government in 1982. With an eye toward the handover of Hong Kong from the British in 1997, authorities in China sought Pei's aid on a new tower for the local branch of the Bank of China. The Chinese government was preparing for a new wave of engagement with the outside world and sought a tower to represent modernity and economic strength. Given the elder Pei's history with the bank before the Communist takeover, government officials visited the 89-year-old man in New York to gain approval for his son's involvement. Pei then spoke with his father at length about the proposal. Although the architect remained pained by his experience with Fragrant Hills, he agreed to accept the commission.

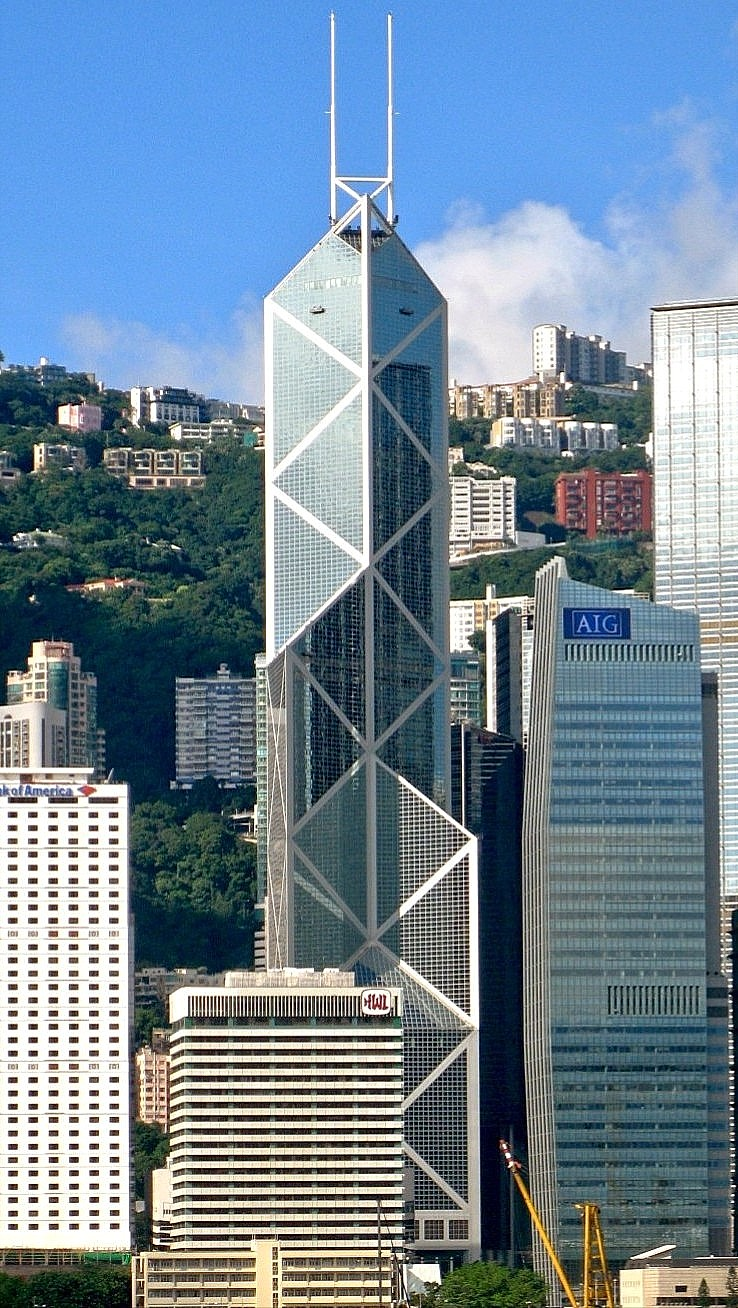
The trunk of the Bank of China Tower resembles growing bamboo, a symbol of vitality in Chinese culture.

The proposed site in Hong Kong's Central District was less than ideal; a tangle of highways lined it on three sides. The area had also been home to a headquarters for Japanese military police during World War II, and was notorious for prisoner torture. The small parcel of land made a tall tower necessary, and Pei had usually shied away from such projects; in Hong Kong especially, the skyscrapers lacked any real architectural character. Lacking inspiration and unsure of how to approach the building, Pei took a weekend vacation to the family home in Katonah, New York. There he found himself experimenting with a bundle of sticks until he happened upon a cascading sequence.

Pei felt that his design for the Bank of China Tower needed to reflect "the aspirations of the Chinese people". The design that he developed for the skyscraper was not only unique in appearance, but also sound enough to pass the city's rigorous standards for wind-resistance. The building is composed of four triangular shafts rising up from a square base, supported by a visible truss structure that distributes stress to the four corners of the base. Using the reflective glass that had become something of a trademark for him, Pei organized the facade around diagonal bracing in a union of structure and form that reiterates the triangle motif established in the plan. At the top, he designed the roofs at sloping angles to match the rising aesthetic of the building. Some influential advocates of feng shui in Hong Kong and China criticized the design, and Pei and government officials responded with token adjustments.

As the tower neared completion, Pei was shocked to witness the government's massacre of unarmed civilians at the Tiananmen Square protests of 1989. He wrote an opinion piece for The New York Times titled "China Won't Ever Be the Same", in which he said that the killings "tore the heart out of a generation that carries the hope for the future of the country". The massacre deeply disturbed his entire family, and he wrote that "China is besmirched."

=== 1990–2019: museum projects ===
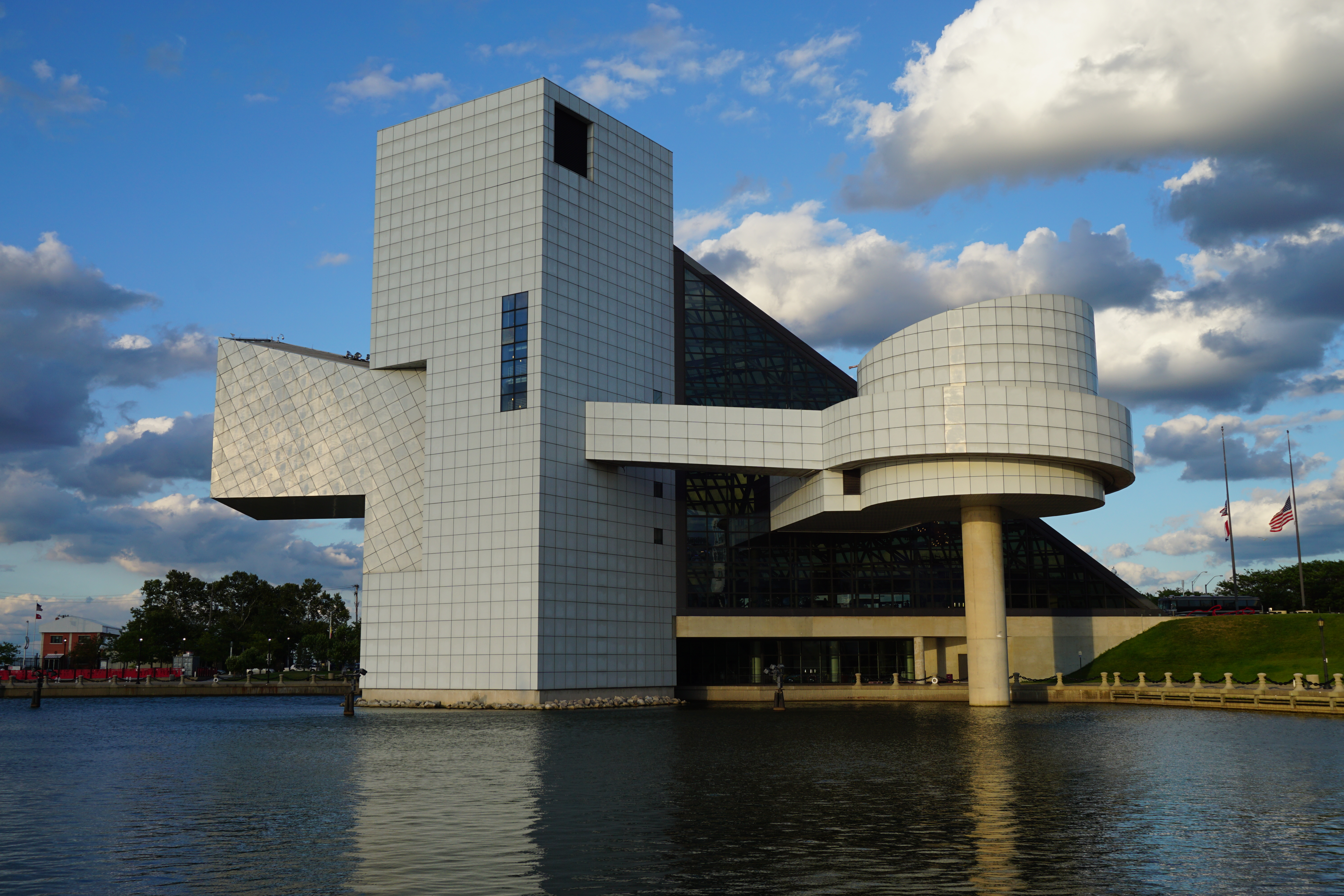
One staff member sympathized with Pei's frustrations with the lack of organization at the Rock and Roll Hall of Fame, admitting that he was "operating in a vacuum".

As the 1990s began, Pei transitioned into a role of decreased involvement with his firm. The staff had begun to shrink, and Pei wanted to dedicate himself to smaller projects allowing for more creativity. Before he made this change, however, he set to work on his last major project as active partner: the Rock and Roll Hall of Fame in Cleveland, Ohio. Considering his work on such bastions of high culture as the Louvre and U.S. National Gallery, some critics were surprised by his association with what many considered a tribute to low culture. The sponsors of the hall, however, sought Pei for specifically this reason; they wanted the building to have an aura of respectability from the beginning. Pei accepted the commission in part because of the unique challenge it presented.

Using a glass wall for the entrance, similar in appearance to his Louvre pyramid, Pei coated the exterior of the main building in white metal, and placed a large cylinder on a narrow perch to serve as a performance space. The combination of off-centered wraparounds and angled walls was, Pei said, designed to provide "a sense of tumultuous youthful energy, rebelling, flailing about".

The building opened in 1995, and was received with moderate praise. The New York Times called it "a fine building", but Pei was among those who felt disappointed with the results. The museum's early beginnings in New York combined with an unclear mission created a fuzzy understanding among project leaders for precisely what was needed. Although the city of Cleveland benefited greatly from the new tourist attraction, Pei was unhappy with it.

At the same time, Pei designed a new museum for Luxembourg, the Musée d'art moderne Grand-Duc Jean, commonly known as the Mudam. Drawing from the original shape of the Fort Thüngen walls where the museum was located, Pei planned to remove a portion of the original foundation. Public resistance to the historical loss forced a revision of his plan, however, and the project was nearly abandoned. The size of the building was halved, and it was set back from the original wall segments to preserve the foundation. Pei was disappointed with the alterations, but remained involved in the building process even during construction.

In 1995, Pei was hired to design an extension to the Deutsches Historisches Museum, or German Historical Museum in Berlin. Returning to the challenge of the East Building of the U.S. National Gallery, Pei worked to combine a modernist approach with a classical main structure. He described the glass cylinder addition as a "beacon", and topped it with a glass roof to allow plentiful sunlight inside. Pei had difficulty working with German government officials on the project; their utilitarian approach clashed with his passion for aesthetics. "They thought I was nothing but trouble", he said.

Pei also worked at this time on two projects for a new Japanese religious movement called Shinji Shumeikai. He was approached by the movement's spiritual leader, Kaishu Koyama, who impressed the architect with her sincerity and willingness to give him significant artistic freedom. One of the buildings was a bell tower, designed to resemble the bachi used when playing traditional instruments like the shamisen. Pei was unfamiliar with the movement's beliefs, but explored them in order to represent something meaningful in the tower. As he said: "It was a search for the sort of expression that is not at all technical."

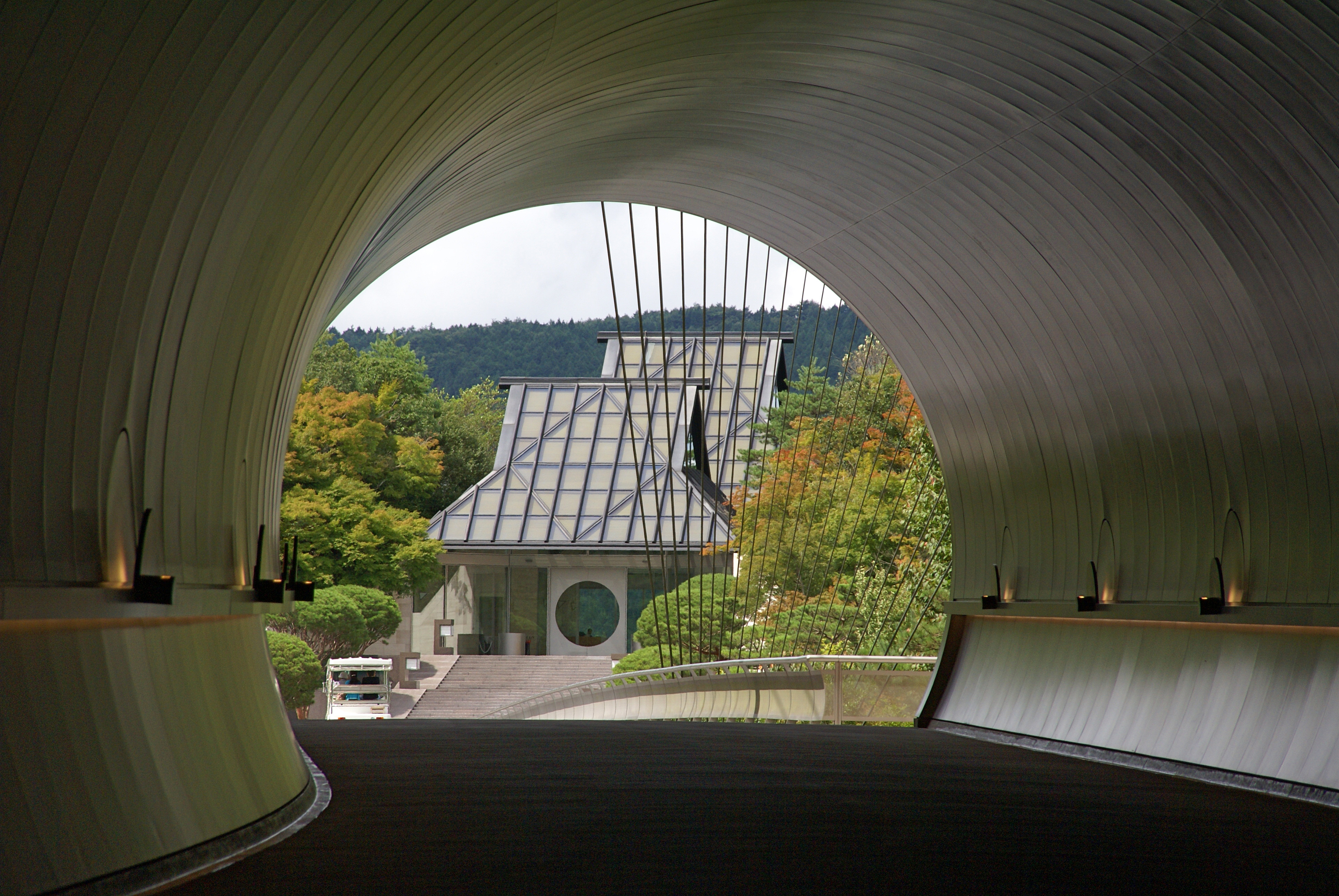
Pei's tunnel through a mountain leading to the Miho Museum was partly inspired by a story from fourth-century Chinese poet Tao Yuanming.

The experience was rewarding for Pei, and he agreed immediately to work with the group again. The new project was the Miho Museum, to display Koyama's collection of tea ceremony artifacts. Pei visited the site in Shiga Prefecture, and during their conversations convinced Koyama to expand her collection. She conducted a global search and acquired more than 300 items showcasing the history of the Silk Road.

One major challenge was the approach to the museum. The Japanese team proposed a winding road up the mountain, not unlike the approach to the NCAR building in Colorado. Instead, Pei ordered a hole cut through a nearby mountain, connected to a major road via a bridge suspended from ninety-six steel cables and supported by a post set into the mountain. The museum itself was built into the mountain, with 80 percent of the building underground.

When designing the exterior, Pei borrowed from the tradition of Japanese temples, particularly those found in nearby Kyoto. He created a concise spaceframe wrapped into French limestone and covered with a glass roof. Pei also oversaw specific decorative details, including a bench in the entrance lobby, carved from a 350-year-old keyaki tree. Because of Koyama's considerable wealth, money was rarely considered an obstacle; estimates at the time of completion put the cost of the project at US$350 million.

During the first decade of the 2000s, Pei designed a variety of buildings, including the Suzhou Museum near his childhood home. He also designed the Museum of Islamic Art in Doha, Qatar, at the request of the Al-Thani Family. Although it was originally planned for the corniche road along Doha Bay, Pei convinced the project coordinators to build a new island to provide the needed space. He then spent six months touring the region and surveying mosques in Spain, Syria, and Tunisia. He was especially impressed with the elegant simplicity of the Mosque of Ibn Tulun in Cairo.

Once again, Pei sought to combine new design elements with the classical aesthetic most appropriate for the location of the building. The sand-colored rectangular boxes rotate evenly to create a subtle movement, with small arched windows at regular intervals into the limestone exterior. Inside, galleries are arranged around a massive atrium, lit from above. The museum's coordinators were pleased with the project; its official website describes its "true splendour unveiled in the sunlight," and speaks of "the shades of colour and the interplay of shadows paying tribute to the essence of Islamic architecture".

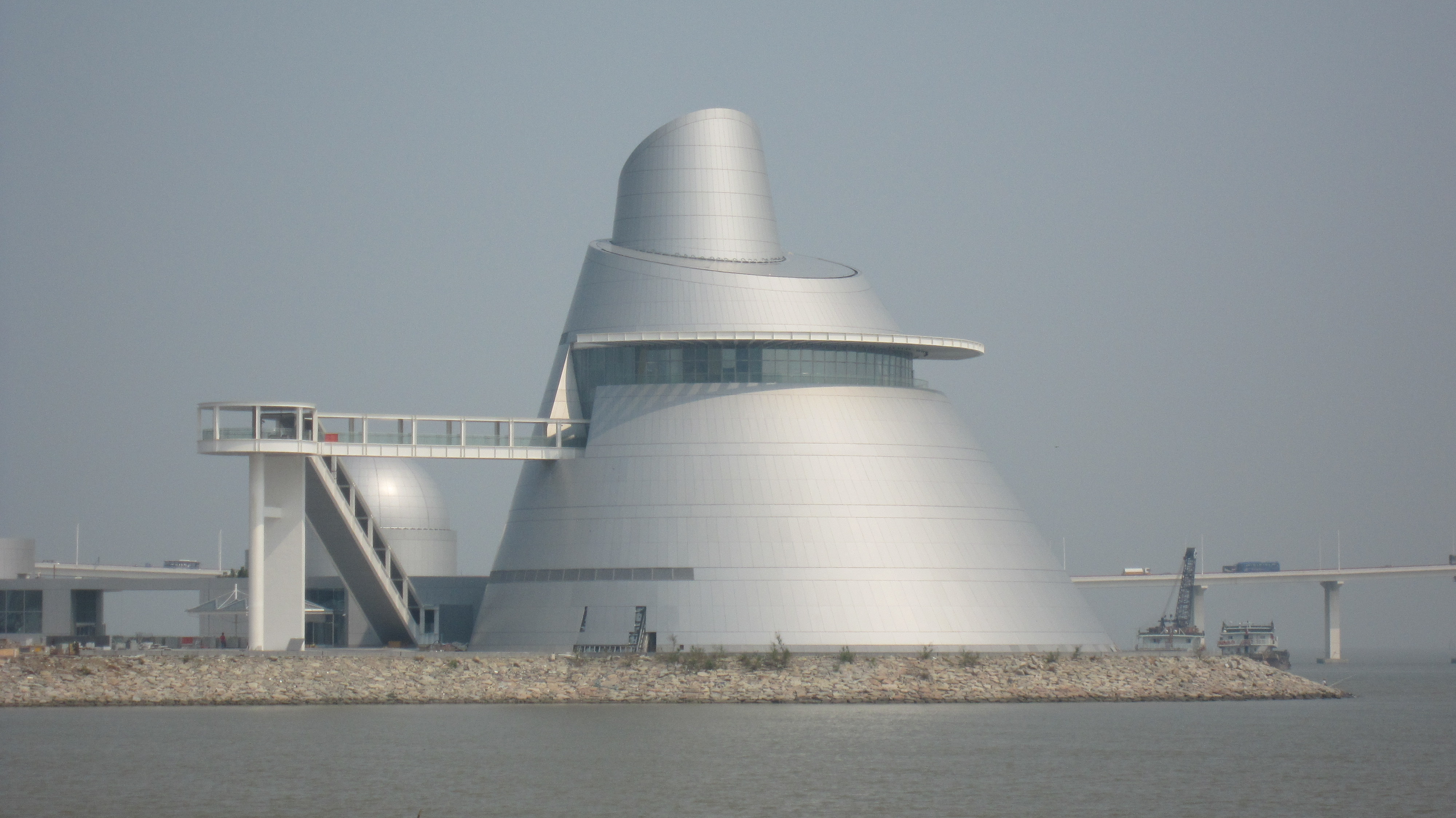
The Macao Science Center in Macau, designed by Pei Partnership Architects in association with I. M. Pei.

The Macao Science Center in Macau was designed by Pei Partnership Architects in association with I. M. Pei. The project to build the science center was conceived in 2001 and construction started in 2006. The center was completed in 2009 and opened by the Chinese President Hu Jintao. The main part of the building is a distinctive conical shape with a spiral walkway and large atrium inside, similar to that of the Solomon R. Guggenheim Museum in New York City. Galleries lead off the walkway, mainly consisting of interactive exhibits aimed at science education. The building is in a prominent position by the sea and is now a Macau landmark.

Pei's career ended with his death in May 2019, at 102 years of age.

== Style and method ==
Pei's style was described as thoroughly modernist, with significant cubist themes. He was known for combining traditional architectural principles with progressive designs based on simple geometric patterns—circles, squares, and triangles are common elements of his work in both plan and elevation. As one critic wrote: "Pei has been aptly described as combining a classical sense of form with a contemporary mastery of method." In 2000, biographer Carter Wiseman called Pei "the most distinguished member of his Late-Modernist generation still in practice". At the same time, Pei himself rejected simple dichotomies of architectural trends. He once said:

The talk about modernism versus post-modernism is unimportant. It's a side issue. An individual building, the style in which it is going to be designed and built, is not that important. The important thing, really, is the community. How does it affect life?

Pei's work is celebrated throughout the world of architecture. His colleague John Portman once told him: "Just once, I'd like to do something like the East Building." But this originality did not always bring large financial reward; as Pei replied to the successful architect: "Just once, I'd like to make the kind of money you do." His concepts, moreover, were too individualized and dependent on context to have given rise to a particular school of design. Pei referred to his own "analytical approach" when explaining the lack of a "Pei School".

"For me," he said, "the important distinction is between a stylistic approach to the design; and an analytical approach giving the process of due consideration to time, place, and purpose ... My analytical approach requires a full understanding of the three essential elements ... to arrive at an ideal balance among them."

== Awards and honors ==
In the words of his biographer, Pei won "every award of any consequence in his art", including the Arnold Brunner Award from the National Institute of Arts and Letters (1963), the Gold Medal for Architecture from the American Academy of Arts and Letters (1979), the AIA Gold Medal (1979), the first Praemium Imperiale for Architecture from the Japan Art Association (1989), the Lifetime Achievement Award from the Cooper-Hewitt, National Design Museum, the 1998 Edward MacDowell Medal in the Arts, and the 2010 Royal Gold Medal from the Royal Institute of British Architects. In 1983 he was awarded the Pritzker Prize, sometimes referred to as the Nobel Prize of architecture. In its citation, the jury said: "Ieoh Ming Pei has given this century some of its most beautiful interior spaces and exterior forms ... His versatility and skill in the use of materials approach the level of poetry." The prize was accompanied by a US$100,000 award, which Pei used to create a scholarship for Chinese students to study architecture in the U.S., on the condition that they return to China to work. In 1986, he was one of twelve recipients of the Medal of Liberty. When he was awarded the 2003 Henry C. Turner Prize by the National Building Museum, museum board chair Carolyn Brody praised his impact on construction innovation: "His magnificent designs have challenged engineers to devise innovative structural solutions, and his exacting expectations for construction quality have encouraged contractors to achieve high standards." In December 1992, Pei was awarded the Presidential Medal of Freedom by President George H. W. Bush. In 1996, Pei became the first person to be elected a foreign member of the Chinese Academy of Engineering. Pei was also an elected member of the American Academy of Arts and Sciences and the American Philosophical Society.

== Personal life ==
Pei's wife, Eileen Loo, died on June 20, 2014. Together they had three sons, T'ing Chung (1945–2003), Chien Chung (1946–2023; known as Didi), and Li Chung (b. 1949; known as Sandi); and a daughter, Liane (b. 1960). T'ing Chung was an urban planner and alumnus of his father's alma mater MIT and Harvard. Chieng Chung and Li Chung, who are both Harvard Graduate School of Design alumni, founded and run Pei Partnership Architects. Liane is a lawyer.

Pei was considered an influential representative of Chinese Americans. At the recommendation of Henry Kissinger, he founded the Committee of 100, an organization of prominent Chinese Americans which advocates for closer relations between the United States and Greater China, in 1989.

In 2015, Pei's home health aide, Eter Nikolaishvili, grabbed Pei's right forearm and twisted it, resulting in bruising and bleeding and necessitating hospital treatment. Pei alleged that the assault occurred when Pei threatened to call the police about Nikolaishvili. Nikolaishvili agreed to plead guilty in 2016.

Pei celebrated his 100th birthday on April 26, 2017. He died at his Sutton Place, Manhattan apartment on May 16, 2019, at the age of 102.

== See also ==
- Chinese Americans in New York City
- List of I. M. Pei projects
