= 131 Ponce de Leon Avenue =

Building in Georgia, United States

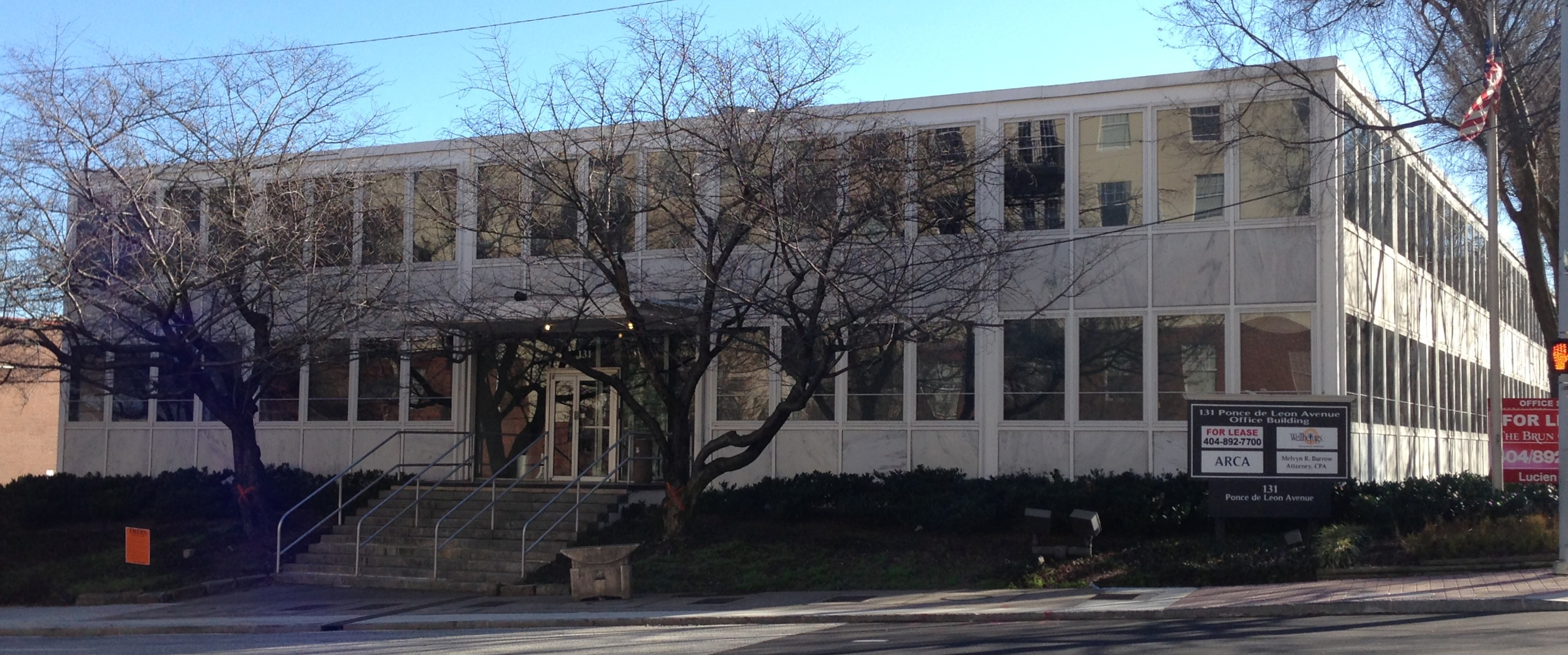
- 131 Ponce de Leon Avenue (I. M. Pei building) in January 2013, just before its demolition
- Interactive map of the 131 Ponce de Leon Avenue area
- Alternative names: Gulf Oil Building

General information
- Location: 131 Ponce de Leon Avenue, Atlanta, United States
- Coordinates: 33.772106°N 84.383047°W
- Opened: 1949
- Demolished: February 2013

Technical details
- Floor count: 2
- Floor area: 50,000 square feet

Design and construction
- Architect: I. M. Pei

131 Ponce de Leon Avenue, also known as the Gulf Oil Building, was a building at the southeast corner of Ponce de Leon Avenue and Juniper Street in Midtown Atlanta, Georgia, U.S. The site is occupied by a mixed-use development of the same name, which incorporates portions of the Pei building's façade, with 321 apartments and 8,600 square feet (800 m^{2}) of retail space.

The building was architect I. M. Pei's first project, built in 1949, a 50,000-square-foot (4,600 m^{2}) two-story "box that invoked the lean rectilinearity of Mies van der Rohe".

The mixed-use development incorporates the entire block bounded by Ponce de Leon Avenue, North Avenue, Piedmont Avenue and Juniper Street, except for St. Paul's church. A joint venture between real estate investment company Sereo Group Inc. and developer Faison Enterprises bought the 2.5-acre (10,000 m^{2}) site in 2012.

In 2008, the block had been proposed for redevelopment as the "Fountain on Ponce" complex, but that project did not go through.

The building was demolished in February 2013, but the Atlanta Preservation Center stated that its understanding that a portion of the façade was to be "resurrected as a shell" and incorporated into the new complex. The demolition involved taking apart the building piece by piece. The front portion of the building was then reconstructed for use as the clubhouse and offices of the mixed use development.
