= Maura Hagan =

Physicist

- Born: Maura E. Hagan
- Education: Emmanuel College, Massachusetts; Boston College
- Awards: Member of the National Academy of Sciences (2019)
- Scientific career
- Workplaces: Utah State University; National Center for Atmospheric Research
- Thesis: Solar Cycle Variability of Exospheric Temperature (1986)
- Website: physics.usu.edu/people/faculty-logan/maura-hagan

Maura Elizabeth Hagan is a professor emeritus of Physics and a former Dean of the College of Science at Utah State University. She is a Fellow of both the American Meteorological Society and the American Geophysical Union, and was elected a member of the National Academy of Sciences in 2019.

== Early life and education ==
Hagan studied physics at Emmanuel College, Massachusetts. She earned a bachelor's degree in 1975, before joining Boston College as a graduate student. She earned a master's degree in 1980 and a doctorate in 1986. Hagan worked on exospheric temperature with William L. Oliver, using measurements made at Millstone Hill between 1970 and 1980. Hagan joined the Haystack Observatory at the Massachusetts Institute of Technology as a staff member in 1986.

== Research and career ==
In 1992 Hagan was made a Senior Scientist at the National Center for Atmospheric Research (NCAR) High Altitude Observatory. She held various roles at NCAR, including acting as Director of the Advanced Study Program, deputy director and Interim Director. She developed the Global Scale Wave Model (GSWM), which describes the Rossby waves and solar tides within the Earth's atmosphere. Her model incorporated a gravity wave stress parametrisation and adaptions to the atmospheric background using Upper Atmosphere Research Satellite (UARS) climatologies. She studies several layers of the atmosphere, including the mesosphere, Ionosphere and thermosphere. She is interested in how these atmospheric layers couple together, as well as how they influence tides and Rossby waves. She also studies the downward effect of space weather.

In 2006 she was part of the team who identified the first global connection between space weather and weather on Earth. The collaboration used the IMAGE spacecraft to study plasma bands in the upper atmosphere, finding ultra bright areas that were located above thunderstorms in tropical rainforests. Atmospheric tides are global-scale waves that are excited by the heating of the lower and middle atmosphere due to the absorption of solar radiation and the latent heating of evaporation when raindrops form in tropical clouds. Hagan used her GSWM to simulate the atmospheric tides produced by thunderstorms in tropical rainforests, finding that some of these tides would deposit their energy in the Kennelly–Heaviside layer. This results in a disruption of the Kennelly–Heaviside layer plasma currents and creates bright, dense zones. Hagan was also a member of the Upper Atmosphere Research Satellite team, studying the dynamic chemical signatures of the middle atmosphere.

Hagan joined the Utah State University in September 2015.

=== Academic service ===
In 1993 Hagan was made Associate Editor of Geophysical Research Letters. She is a member of the Aspen Global Change Institute. She was appointed to the Committee on Solar Terrestrial Research in 1996. She has also served on the CEDAR Science Steering Committee. Since 2008 Hagan has worked as a Guest Lecturer at the University of Colorado Boulder. She was appointed to the National Academy of Sciences Board on Atmospheric Sciences and Climate in 2014. She is co-chair of the National Academies of Sciences, Engineering, and Medicine Committee on Solar and Space Physics. Hagan was elected Dean of the College of Science at Utah State University in 2016.

== Awards and honors ==
- 2006 NASA Group Achievement Award
- 2008 MIT Michael J. Buonsanto Memorial Lecturer
- 2008 NASA Group Achievement Award
- 2011Fellow of the American Meteorological Society
- 2011 Fellow of the American Geophysical Union
- 2012 University of Wyoming Robert A. Jenkins Memorial Lecturer
- 2013 University Corporation for Atmospheric Research Outstanding Accomplishment Award for Mentoring
- 2014 Space Physics and Aeronomy Marcel Nicolet Lecturer
- 2016 University Corporation for Atmospheric Research Science Advancement Winner
- 2018 Elected member of the National Academy of Sciences
