= 3428 Roberts =

Main-belt asteroid

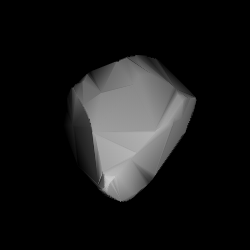
- Shape model of Roberts from its lightcurve

Discovery
- Discovered by: Indiana University (Indiana Asteroid Program)
- Discovery site: Goethe Link Obs.
- Discovery date: 1 May 1952

Designations
- Named after: Walter Orr Roberts (American astronomer)
- Alternative designations: 1952 JH · 1952 KB; 1972 YQ_{1} · 1978 JH_{2} 1980 TD_{15} · 1982 FR_{1}
- Minor planet category: main-belt · (middle); background

Orbital characteristics
- Epoch 23 March 2018 (JD 2458200.5)
- Uncertainty parameter 0
- Observation arc: 65.41 yr (23,891 d)
- Aphelion: 3.1044 AU
- Perihelion: 2.2199 AU
- Semi-major axis: 2.6621 AU
- Eccentricity: 0.1661
- Orbital period (sidereal): 4.34 yr (1,587 d)
- Mean anomaly: 102.91°
- Mean motion: 0° 13^{m} 36.84^{s} / day
- Inclination: 8.8754°
- Longitude of ascending node: 230.80°
- Argument of perihelion: 303.48°

Physical characteristics
- Mean diameter: 17.163±0.118 km; 18.47±1.31 km
- Synodic rotation period: 3.278±0.001 h
- Pole ecliptic latitude: (63.0°, 49.0°) (λ_{1}/β_{1}); (231.0°, 49.0°) (λ_{2}/β_{2})
- Geometric albedo: 0.082±0.012; 0.095±0.012
- Spectral type: C/S (assumed)
- Absolute magnitude (H): 12.00

3428 Roberts (prov. designation: 1952 JH) is a background asteroid from the central regions of the asteroid belt, approximately 17 kilometers (11 miles) in diameter. It was discovered on 1 May 1952, by Indiana University's Indiana Asteroid Program at its Goethe Link Observatory near Brooklyn, Indiana, United States. The asteroid has a short rotation period of 3.28 hours. It was named in memory of American astronomer Walter Orr Roberts.

== Orbit and classification ==
Roberts is a non-family asteroid of the main belt's background population when applying the hierarchical clustering method to its proper orbital elements. It orbits the Sun in the central asteroid belt at a distance of 2.2–3.1 AU once every 4 years and 4 months (1,587 days; semi-major axis of 2.66 AU). Its orbit has an eccentricity of 0.17 and an inclination of 9° with respect to the ecliptic. The body's observation arc begins with its official discovery observation at Goethe Link in May 1952.

== Naming ==
This minor planet was named in memory of American physicist and astronomer Walter Orr Roberts (1915–1990), founding director of the National Center for Atmospheric Research, who was one of the first astronomers to use a coronagraph for his solar observations in the 1940s. The official naming citation was published by the Minor Planet Center on 5 September 1990 (M.P.C. 16885).

== Physical characteristics ==
Roberts spectral type is unknown. The Collaborative Asteroid Lightcurve Link (CALL) generically assumed it to be either a C-type or S-type asteroid.

=== Rotation period and poles ===
In March 2008, a rotational lightcurve of Roberts was obtained from photometric observations at the Oakley Southern Sky Observatory in Australia. Lightcurve analysis gave a well-defined rotation period of 3.278 hours with a high brightness amplitude of 0.58 magnitude (U=3), indicative of an elongated shape. In 2016, a modeled lightcurves using photometric data from various sources, gave a sidereal period of 3.27835±0.00005 hours and two spin axes of (63.0°, 49.0°) and (231.0°, 49.0°) in ecliptic coordinates (λ, β).

=== Diameter and albedo ===
According to the surveys carried out by the Japanese Akari satellite and the NEOWISE mission of NASA's Wide-field Infrared Survey Explorer, Roberts measures between 17.16 and 18.47 kilometers in diameter and its surface has an albedo between 0.082 and 0.095.

CALL assumes an albedo of 0.10 – a compromise value between the stony (0.20) and carbonaceous (0.057) asteroids of the inner and outer main belt, respectively – and calculates a diameter of 16.73 kilometers based on an absolute magnitude of 12.0.
