= Carolyn Brinkworth =

Advocate of ACO in STEM, LGBTQ activist

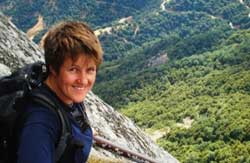
- Brinkworth in 2010
- Occupations: Access, culture, and opportunity officer

Academic background
- Education: University of Southampton: California Institute of Technology; Claremont Graduate School

Academic work
- Discipline: Astrophysics, Education
- Institutions: University Corporation for Atmospheric Research

Carolyn S. Brinkworth (born 1979) is a British-born LGBTQ community member and advocate of access to supportive workplace cultures in STEM educational institutions, based in the United States. She has a background in astrophysics and researches the effectiveness of career development seminars in encouraging students from underrepresented communities to pursue STEM professions.

== Early life and education ==
Born in Coventry, United Kingdom, Brinkworth completed an undergraduate degree in physics and astrophysics at the University of Leicester. She then started her graduate studies at the University of Southampton, assisting research on "a new high-speed camera designed to measure evolution rates in binary stars".

Brinkworth moved to the United States to attend the California Institute of Technology (Caltech) and the Jet Propulsion Laboratory working with the Spitzer Space Telescope. She completed her PhD in astrophysics at Southampton with postdoctoral research at Caltech. Her astronomy research focused primarily on studying the dusty debris rings orbiting around white dwarfs in order to give insight into the potential future of planetary systems similar to the Solar System.

She later received a master's degree in education at Claremont Graduate School, focusing on "building safer spaces for LGBT+ people in STEM departments."

== Career ==
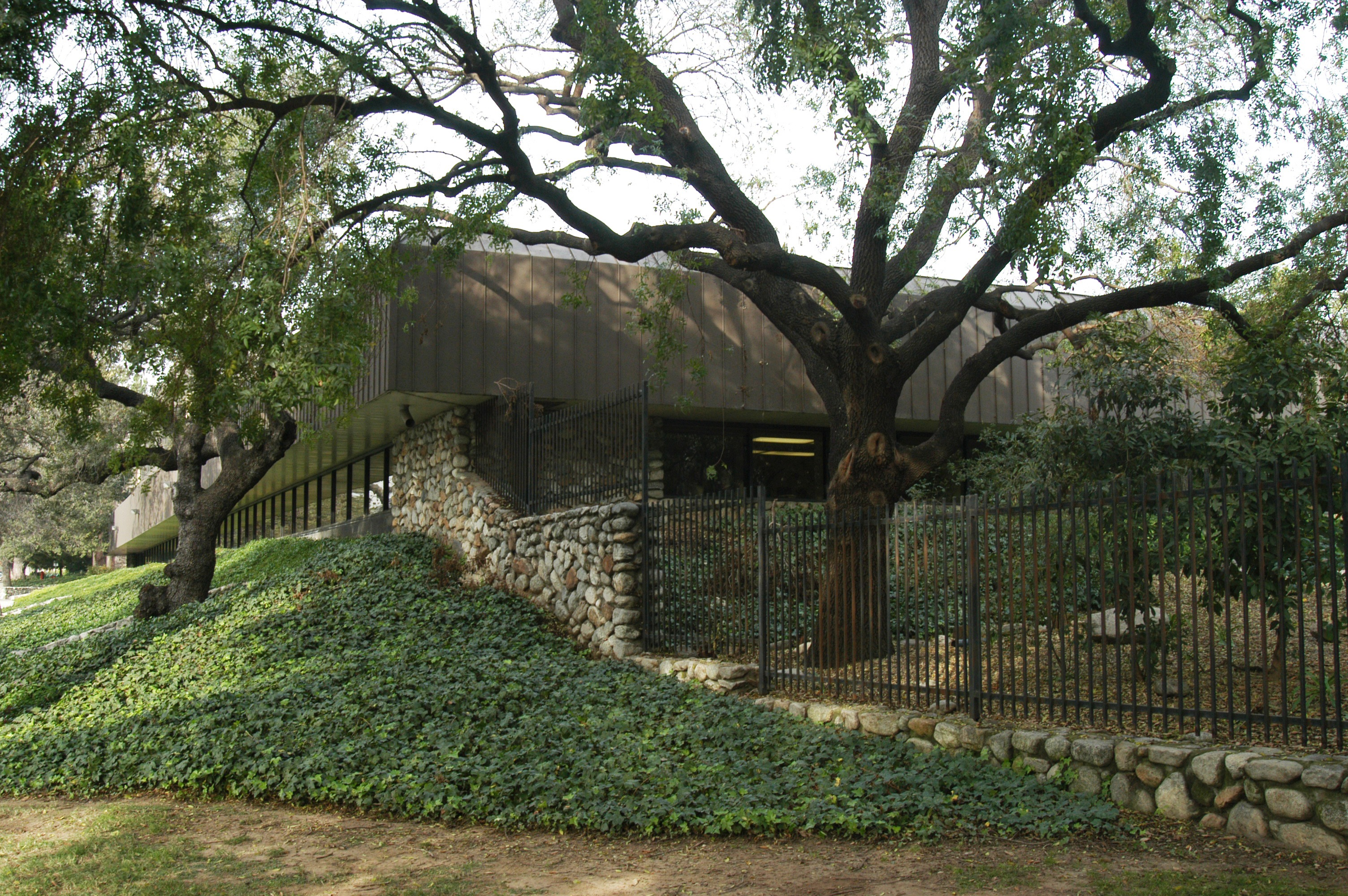
The Infrared Processing and Analysis Center at the California Institute of Technology

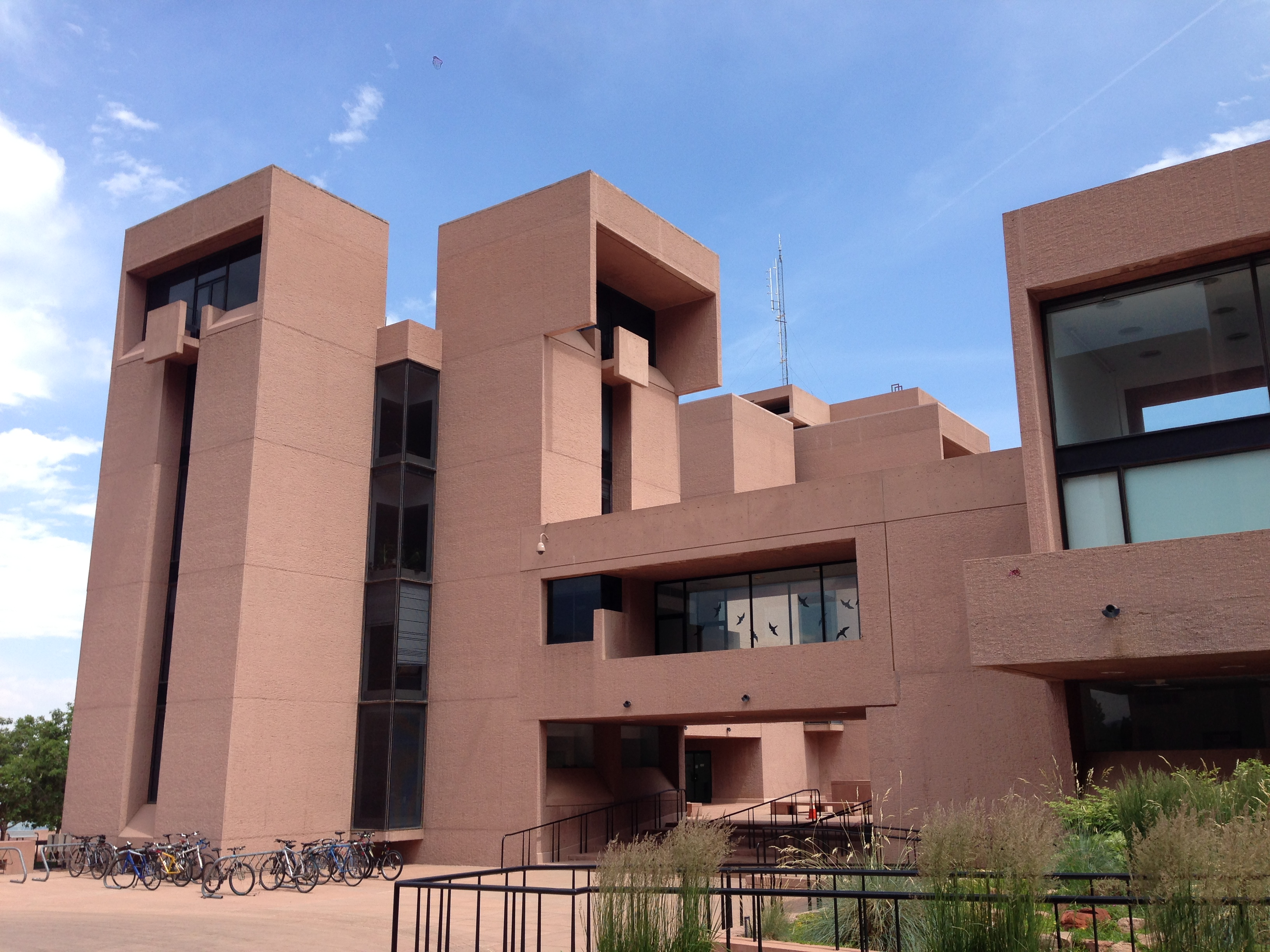
National Center for Atmospheric Research (NCAR)

Brinkworth started her career as an astronomer at the Infrared Processing and Analysis Center (IPAC), based at the California Institute of Technology.

In 2014, she joined the National Center for Atmospheric Research (NCAR) as the director of diversity, education and outreach. At NCAR and its parent organization, the University Corporation for Atmospheric Research (UCAR) in Boulder. There she introduced workforce training programs on equal access, opportunity, and bystander intervention, including UNEION, a training program to support welcoming workplace environments for all.

In 2017 Brinkworth started as the chief diversity, equity and inclusion officer at UCAR. One of the programs supported by her office is Rising Voices, a collaboration with Haskell Indian Nations University in Kansas. The program encourages dialogue between indigenous and non-indigenous communities on climate and weather-related topics.

As of 2024, Brinkworth led the Office of Access, Culture, and Opportunity, supporting equal access and opportunity for all current and prospective employees and visitors and fostering a welcoming and supportive workplace environment.

== Research ==
Brinkworth's research focus on creating welcoming and supportive spaces for STEM employees and the factors influencing public support for science and government funding for scientific research.

=== LGBTQ students in STEM ===
Her master's thesis, From Chilly Climate to Warm Reception, explored the experiences of LGBTQ students studying STEM, and emphasized the need to for higher education institutions to create inclusive environments and supports for LGBTQ individuals, particularly transgender students.

Brinkworth proposes several recommendations to address the challenges faced by this community. Some of these suggestions are LGBTQ resource centers on campus, harassment prevention and intervention, inclusive and flexible student housing options, LGBTQ accessible healthcare, policy reform, and the ongoing education of faculty, staff, and students on the impact they each can make.

=== Impact of workshops ===
Brinkworth co-authored a 2017 study, Long-term impacts of a career development workshop for undergraduates published in the Bulletin of the American Meteorological Society. The findings show participants in career development workshops had increased communication and leadership abilities. These improved abilities help students stand out in the competitive field of STEM. Their research concluded that effective communication and leadership skills are a difference between pursuing and prospering in a STEM job.

The courses additionally increase the chances of participants securing desired jobs in their chosen fields. Students are better equipped to face the challenges that typically accompany STEM jobs because of the information and tools gained through these programs. This not only benefits the individuals engaged, but it also helps to broaden participation in the STEM workforce, resulting in more equitable and inclusive environments.

In 2019, Brinkworth co-authored an article in Journal of Geoscience Education, Developing scientists as champions of diversity to transform the geosciences. The article assesses Geo Opportunities for Leadership in Diversity (GOLD) Institutes in equipping senior geoscientists with knowledge of access, opportunity, and workplace culture practices. Results showed that this was effective.

== Community service ==
In 2011, Brinkworth started a volunteer program with Learning Works, a Southern California school for in-crisis students, coordinating workshops and field trips on robotics and astronomy. She also volunteered with The Trevor Project, a crisis intervention and suicide prevention program for LGBTQ youth ages 13 to 24, speaking about LGBTQ issues in the classroom.

== Awards ==
NASA Equal Employment Opportunity Medal

Brinkworth received the 2013 NASA Equal Employment Opportunity Medal for outstanding leadership, dedication, volunteerism, mentoring, and activism for underrepresented student groups through science education workshops and programs. Her dedication to expanding the geosciences field was honorably recognized by her selection to the National Science Foundation's Geoscience Opportunities for Leadership in Diversity (GOLD) Ideas Lab in 2016.

== Selected publications ==
- Brinkworth, C. S. (2016). "The myth and reality of meritocracy." Women in astronomy review.
- Valerie Sloan, Rebecca Haacker, Tim Barnes, Carolyn Brinkworth (2017). "Long-Term Impacts of a Career Development Workshop for Undergraduates".
- Allison-Scott Pruitt, Carolyn Brinkworth, Joshua Young & Kristen Luna Aponte (2018). "5 Things We Learned About Creating a Successful Workplace Diversity Program." Harvard Business Review.
- Quardokus Fisher, K., Kaufman, E., Calagna, O., Myles, L., Brinkworth, C., Simmons, D. & Dixon, P. G. (2019). "Developing scientists as champions of diversity to transform the geosciences". Journal of Geoscience Education
