= Everette Joseph =

American atmospheric scientist

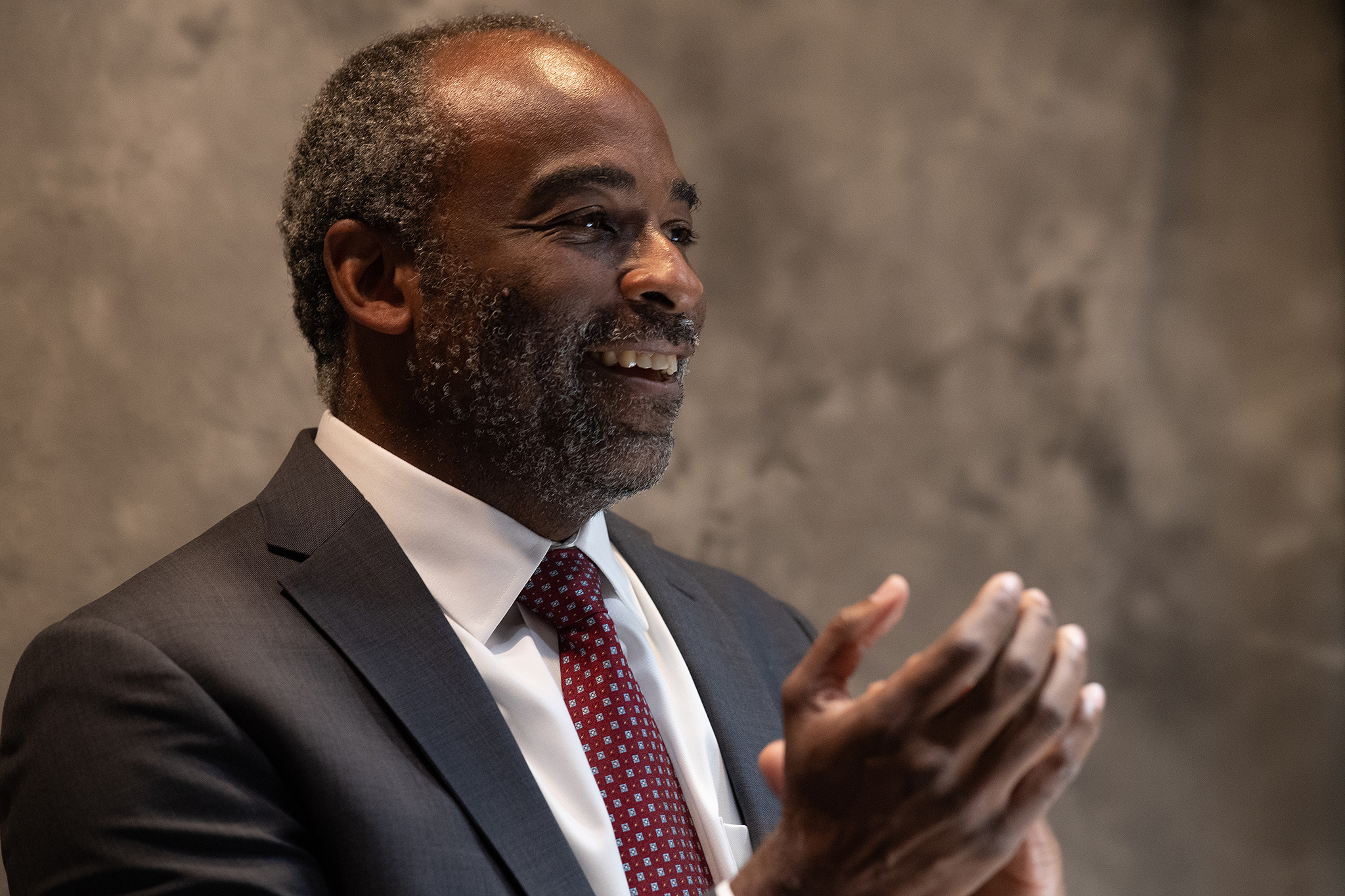
- Alma mater: State University of New York at Cortland; University at Albany
- Occupation: Atmospheric physicist
- Employer: Howard University; National Center for Atmospheric Research (2019–)

Everette Joseph is an American atmospheric scientist who has served as the director of the National Center for Atmospheric Research (NCAR) in Boulder, Colorado since 2019.

== Education and career ==
Joseph graduated from State University of New York College at Cortland with a B.S. in Physics. He earned a Ph.D. in physics from the University at Albany in 1997 with an atmospheric science emphasis. He worked as a postdoctoral research associate at the University at Albany's Atmospheric Sciences Research Center (ASRC).

Joseph directed the Howard University Program in Atmospheric Sciences (HUPAS) from 2008 to 2013 where he and his colleagues increased the number of atmospheric science minority Ph.D. graduates across the country, helping Howard to become a national leader in this effort. At Howard he also taught classes in atmospheric physics, radiation, and remote sensing. Further, he led a major program to improve the ability of space-borne satellites to monitor the atmosphere and to improve the forecasting skill of atmospheric models.

In 2014, Joseph was named director of ASRC at the University at Albany as well as SUNY Empire Innovations Professor in Atmospheric Sciences. His research there focused on improving extreme weather resilience and developing and deploying ground-based and satellite observing systems. He co-led the New York State Mesonet for advanced weather detection and the New York State Center of Excellence for the Weather Enterprise.

Joseph was named director of NCAR in December 2018 following an international search. His appointment was unanimously approved by the board of trustees for the University Corporation for Atmospheric Research (UCAR) which manages NCAR for the National Science Foundation (NSF). He began his employment at NCAR in February 2019.

Joseph has led over $90 million in research grants from the NSF, the National Oceanic and Atmospheric Administration (NOAA), the National Aeronautics and Space Administration (NASA), the Army High Performance Computing Research Center, and other agencies. His research looks at the role of aerosols and certain gases in climate and weather.

Joseph has served on a number of science boards and committees. He joined the UCAR Board of Trustees in 2011 and was elected its vice chair in 2015 and chair in 2017. He has also served on the Board on Atmospheric Sciences and Climate of the National Academy of Sciences, Engineering and Medicine (NASEM); the Steering Committee of the NASEM Decadal Survey for Earth Science and Applications from Space; the NOAA Science Advisory Board; the American Meteorological Society (AMS) Commission on the Weather, Water and Climate Enterprise; the AMS Board on Higher Education; the U.S. Department of Energy Atmospheric Radiation Measurement Climate Research Facility Science Board; and the NASA Science Mission Directorate Research and Analysis Management Operations Working Group.
