= Louis J. Battan =

American meteorologist

- Born: February 9, 1923; United States
- Died: October 29, 1986 (aged 63)
- Education: New York University (B.S., 1946); University of Chicago (M.S.; Ph.D, 1953)
- Known for: Clouds, precipitation and radar work; Thunderstorm Project; NCAR
- Awards: Clarence Leroy Meisinger Award
- Scientific career
- Fields: Atmospheric sciences
- Workplaces: University of Chicago; University of Arizona
- Thesis: Observations on the Formation of Precipitation in Convective Clouds (1953)

Louis Joseph Battan (February 9, 1923 – October 29, 1986) was an American atmospheric scientist who received his doctorate from the University of Chicago in 1953, where he was hired to work in the field of the physics of clouds and precipitation. In 1958 he was appointed professor of meteorology and associate director of the Institute of Atmospheric Physics at the University of Arizona in Tucson. He was a pioneer in cloud physics and radar meteorology.

Battan was born in the New York City and grew up in Brooklyn. He was the second of the four sons born to Annibale and Luisa Battan, devout Catholics who immigrated to the United States from the village of Vigo in the Tyrolean Alps of Austria.

== Career ==
Along with his colleague and close friend, David Atlas, Battan underwent rigorous training in radar engineering and meteorology in the U.S. Army Air Corps, at Harvard University, and the Massachusetts Institute of Technology (MIT) during World War II. He received his B.S. from New York University (NYU) in 1946 and then moved to the University of Chicago where he obtained his M.S. and a Ph.D. in 1953. During the Thunderstorm Project (1946–48), Dr. Battan used radar analysis to show precipitation initiation from coalescence in midlatitude convective clouds. He, along with Dr. Roscoe Braham Jr. and Dr. Horace R. Byers, conducted one of the first randomized experiments on cloud modification by the artificial nucleation of cumulus clouds.

After obtaining his Ph.D., he remained at Chicago until 1958. Then he became a professor in the Department of Atmospheric Sciences and Institute for Atmospheric Physics, University of Arizona, and served as its director from 1973 to 1982. There he conducted research on clouds, precipitation processes, lightning, and radar relationships. He led the development of the first 3-cm Doppler weather radar to measure vertical motion and particle sizes in thunderstorms in 1964.

He was the American Meteorological Society (AMS) president from 1966 to 1967 and served on numerous national and international committees including the U.S. President's National Advisory Committee on Oceans and Atmosphere in 1978. He was instrumental in the founding of the National Center for Atmospheric Research (NCAR), including serving as a long-time member on its Board of Trustees and many advisory capacities. He received many awards including the AMS Meisinger Award (1962), the AMS Charles Franklin Brooks Award for Outstanding Service to the Society (1971), and the AMS Second Half Century Award (1975).

== The Louis J. Battan Author's Award ==
Battan was a prolific writer whose repertoire includes one of the first textbooks on radar meteorology in 1959 and Radar Observation of the Atmosphere in 1973, which became the reference text on the subject. He authored 16 books and more than 100 articles. His contribution to meteorological education, through publications written in an accessible and informative style, has been honored by the AMS with the establishment of two annual "Louis J. Battan Author's Awards".

Recipients of the Louis J. Battan Author's Award (Adult) include: James Rodger Fleming, Professor of Science, Technology, and Society, Colby College, Waterville, Maine (2012); Chris Mooney, Contributing Editor, Science Progress & Author, Washington, DC (2009); Kerry Emanuel (2007); Charles Wohlforth (2006); John M. Nese, Glenn Schwartz (2005); Robert C. Sheets (2004); Susan Solomon (2003); Erik Larson (2002); Howard B. Bluestein (2001); Richard C. J. Somerville (2000); Zbigniew Sorbjan (1998); Jack Fishman, Robert Kalish (1997); Thomas E. Graedel, Paul J. Crutzen (1996); Edward N. Lorenz (1995); Jack Williams (1994); Robert Marc Friedman (1993); John W. Firor (1992); Stephen H. Schneider (1990); Craig F. Bohren (1989).

== Legacy ==
Dr. Battan's work and contributions to the world of meteorology:

- 1964. The nature of violent storms (La Naturaleza de las Tormentas, en español, EUDEBA). 158 pp.
- 1965. Física y siembra de nubes. Volumen 26 de Ciencia joven. EUDEBA. 159 pp.
- 1980. The unclean sky; a meteorologist looks at air pollution. 153 pp.
- Cloud physics and cloud seeding
- Radar observes the weather (El radar explora la atmósfera, en español)
- 1969. Harvesting the Clouds: Advances in Weather Modification. 148 pp.
- 1984. Fundamentals of Meteorology.
- 1983. Weather in Your Life. 230 pp. ISBN 0-7167-1437-X
- Radar meteorology
- Radar observation of the atmosphere
- Weather. Foundations of Earth Science Series. Englewood Cliffs, New Jersey: Prentice Hall. 1974. pp. 74. ISBN 0139477624.
- The Thunderstorm
- 2003. Cloud Physics: A Popular Introduction to Applied Meteorology. 160 pp.
- 1978. The Weather. Omega Ed. 144 pp.. ISBN 84-282-0436-5
