= Eric J. Barron =

American academic administrator

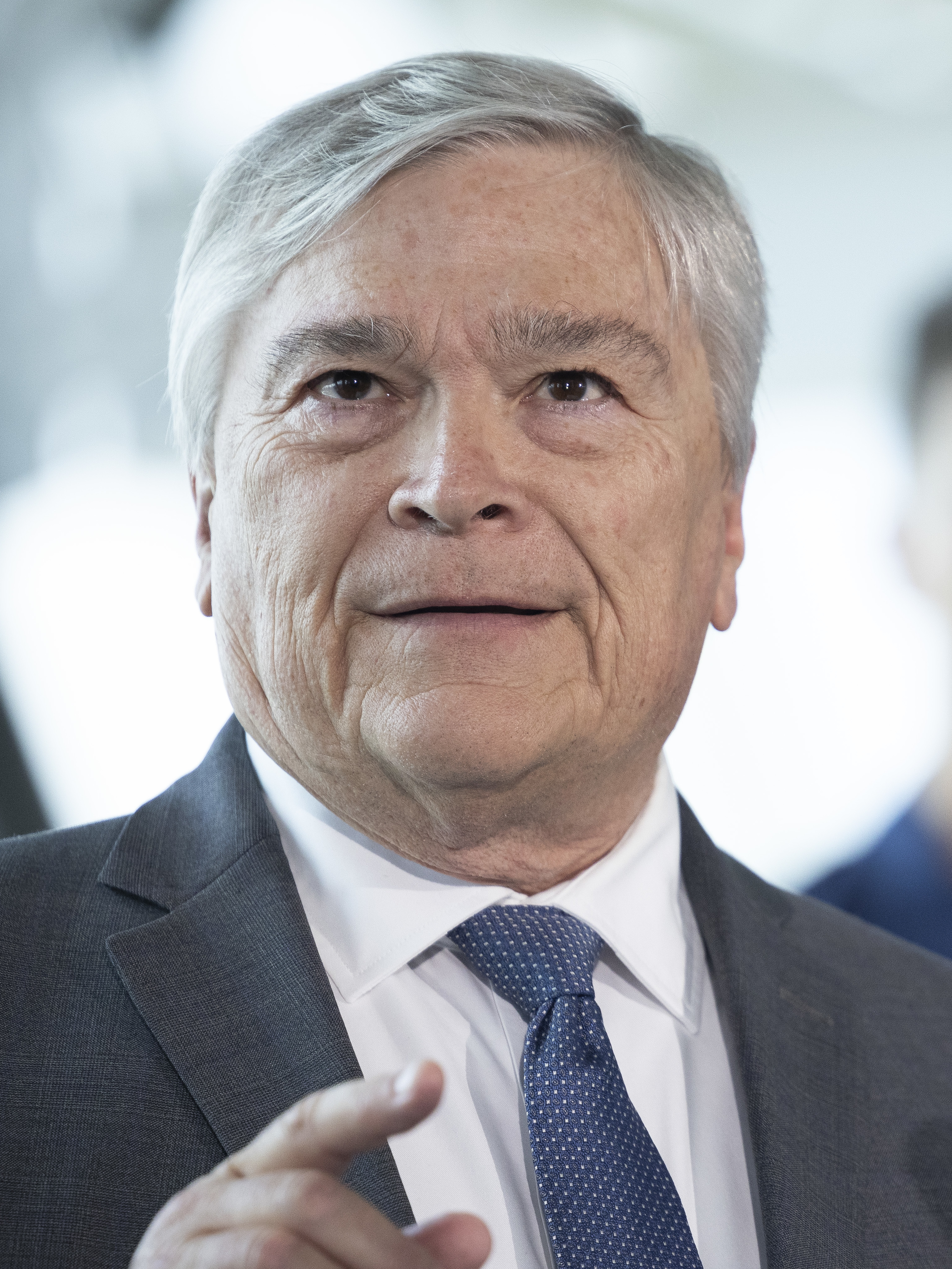
- Barron in July 2021

18th President of the Pennsylvania State University
- In office May 12, 2014 – May 9, 2022
- Preceded by: Rodney Erickson
- Succeeded by: Neeli Bendapudi

14th President of Florida State University
- In office February 1, 2010 – April 2, 2014
- Preceded by: T. K. Wetherell
- Succeeded by: John E. Thrasher

8th Director of the National Center for Atmospheric Research
- In office 2008–2010
- Preceded by: Timothy Killeen
- Succeeded by: Roger Wakimoto

Personal details
- Born: October 26, 1951 (age 75) Lafayette, Indiana, U.S.
- Children: 2
- Education: Florida State University (BS); University of Miami (MS, PhD)

Eric James Barron (born October 26, 1951) is an American academic administrator who has served as the interim president of the University Corporation for Atmospheric Research (UCAR) since May 4, 2026. He previously served as the 18th president of Pennsylvania State University from 2014 until 2022, the 14th president of Florida State University, and the 8th director of the NSF National Center for Atmospheric Research (NCAR) in Boulder, Colorado from 2008 to 2010.

== Early life and education ==
Barron was born on October 26, 1951, in Lafayette, Indiana. He graduated with a Bachelor of Science in geology from Florida State University in 1972. He then attended the University of Miami, where he obtained a Master of Science in oceanography 1976 and a Ph.D. in 1980.

== Career ==
From 1980 to 1985, Barron was employed as a post-doctoral research fellow and scientist by the National Center for Atmospheric Research (NCAR) in Boulder, Colorado. He subsequently was named an associate professor at the University of Miami, where he served from 1985 to 1986.

In 1986, Barron was named a faculty member at Pennsylvania State University in the College of Earth and Mineral Sciences, becoming the dean until leaving Penn State in 2006, to become dean of the Jackson School of Geosciences at the University of Texas at Austin. There, he held the Jackson chair in earth system science.

In 2008, Barron left the University of Texas to become director of the National Center for Atmospheric Sciences (NCAR) from 2008 to 2010, until being named president of Florida State University in December 2009.

Barron was the 14th president of FSU from February 1, 2010, until stepping down on April 2, 2014, after being named the president-elect of the Pennsylvania State University in February 2014. Following the departure of Rodney Erickson on May 12, 2014, Barron became the 18th president of Penn State.

During his term as Penn State president, he resided in Schreyer House, the official president's residence of the university. In February 2021, Barron indicated to the Penn State Board of Trustees his intent to retire at the end of his contract, in June 2022. Barron's tenure ended in May 2022, when he was succeeded by Neeli Bendapudi. During his presidency, one of Barron's focuses was attempting to transform the Greek life system at Penn State following the death of Tim Piazza.

Upon the announced resignation of University Corporation for Atmospheric Research (UCAR) president Antonio Busalacchi, the UCAR board announced on April 2, 2026, that Barron would assume the role of interim president on May 4, 2026.

Barron is a fellow of the American Association for the Advancement of Science and has been chair of numerous National Science Foundation, NASA and United States National Research Council (NRC) committees and panels, including the NRC climate research committee, the NRC board on atmospheric sciences and climate and NASA's earth observing system science executive committee.
