= Robert M. MacQueen =

American physicist

- Born: March 28, 1938; Memphis, Tennessee
- Education: Rhodes College, B.S. 1960 (Physics) Virginia Polytechnic Institute, 1960–1961 The Johns Hopkins University, Ph.D. 1968 (Atmospheric Sciences)
- Awards: NCAR Technology Award, 1973 NASA’s Medal for Exceptional Scientific Achievement, 1974.
- Scientific career
- Fields: Atmospheric sciences Physics
- Workplaces: 1961–1963 Acting assistant professor of physics, Southwestern at Memphis, Memphis, Tennessee 1964–1966 Instructor in astronomy, Goucher College, Baltimore, Maryland 1967–1973 Staff scientist (he gained senior scientist status in 1973), High Altitude Observatory, Boulder, Colorado 1977–1979 Head of the Coronal Physics Section, HAO, Boulder, Colorado 1969–1979 Lecturer, Department of Astrophysical, Planetary and Atmospheric Science, University of Colorado 1979–1988 Director of the High Altitude Observatory, Boulder, Colorado 1986–1988 Associate director of NCAR 1988–1989 Acting director of NCAR 1990–2000 Professor, Physics Department, Rhodes College, Memphis, Tennessee

Robert Moffat MacQueen (born March 28, 1938, in Memphis, Tennessee) is an American physicist. He received his B.S. from Rhodes College in physics in 1960 where he was inducted into Omicron Delta Kappa, and his PhD from Johns Hopkins University in 1968 in atmospheric sciences. In 1967, he joined the National Center for Atmospheric Research (NCAR) as a staff scientist and attained senior scientist status in 1973. He was principal investigator for the White Light Coronagraph operated by the High Altitude Observatory (HAO) aboard the crewed Skylab satellite from 1970 to 1977. In 1974, he received NASA's Exceptional Scientific Achievement Medal for his Skylab work as principal investigator of the white light coronagraph experiment that took nearly 36,000 photographs during the Apollo flight (it was one of six solar observing instruments).

== Professional experience ==
MacQueen was head of the Coronal Physics Section in HAO from 1977 to 1979, and was responsible for analyzing coronal photographs made during the Apollo 15, 16, and 17 lunar landing missions as principal investigator (1971–1973). He later served as principal investigator for several research projects, including HAO's Coronagraph/Polarimeter Experiment that was launched aboard NASA's Solar Maximum Mission spacecraft (1975–1979; 1984–1986), the Rocket Coronagraph Experiment (1975–1979), and the Coronagraph/X Ray/XUV experiment as part of the Solar Polar Mission (1978–1983). In a joint project with the Center for Astrophysics | Harvard & Smithsonian, he was one of the principal investigators for a series of solar observing rocket flights.

== Director of HAO and NCAR ==
From 1979 to 1986 MacQueen was director of HAO. He then became associate director of NCAR from 1986 to 1988, and acting director of NCAR from 1988 to 1989. While at HAO and NCAR, Dr. MacQueen published several articles on coronal streamers and transients. Dr. MacQueen was also a lecturer (1969–1979) and an adjunct professor in the Department of Astrophysical, Planetary and Atmospheric Sciences at the University of Colorado. He left NCAR in 1990 after a one-year sabbatical to head the Physics Department at Rhodes College, where he taught until 2001.

== Awards ==
MacQueen received the NCAR Technology Advancement Award in 1973 and the NASA Medal for Exceptional Scientific Achievement in 1974.
