= John W. Firor =

- Born: October 18, 1927; Athens, GA
- Died: November 5, 2007 (aged 80); Pullman, WA
- Education: B.S. (Physics) 1949, Georgia Institute of Technology Ph.D. (Physics) 1954, University of Chicago
- Scientific career
- Workplaces: Department of Terrestrial Magnetism of the Carnegie Institution of Washington NCAR University of Colorado, Boulder

John W. Firor (October 18, 1927 – November 5, 2007) was an American physicist. He was director of the High Altitude Observatory (HAO) from 1961 to 1968, and director of the National Center for Atmospheric Research (NCAR) from 1968 to 1974.

John Firor was one of the first scientists hired by NCAR, arriving in 1961 to head the High Altitude Observatory just as HAO was being absorbed into the new center. From 1974 to 1980, Firor served as executive director of NCAR, after which he managed the Advanced Study Program up to his retirement in 1996. He mentored countless numbers of young scientists, maintaining his gentle sense of humor and his keen perspective. This image shows Firor lecturing in 1968.

== Biographical information ==
Firor was born in Athens, Georgia on October 18, 1927, where his father, John William Firor, was a professor of agricultural economics and his mother, Mary Valentine Moss, was a homemaker. John was the second youngest of four children. His sister, Anne Firor Scott(b. April 24, 1921), was a historian. His two brothers were Hugh Firor (March 24, 1929 - September 24, 2012 ), a medical doctor, and David (Nov 4, 1923- Oct 17, 2000), a soil and water district supervisor for the Oconee River District.

His interest in physics and astrophysics began while serving in the army, during which time he was assigned to the Los Alamos National Laboratory. After his service, he returned to college and graduated in physics from Georgia Tech in 1949. He received his Ph.D. in physics from the University of Chicago in 1954, writing his thesis on cosmic rays under John Simpson. He moved from cosmic rays to radio astronomy (particularly of the Sun) when he began work at the Carnegie Institution of Washington's Department of Terrestrial Magnetism. He was married twice, to Merle Jenkins Firor (who died in 1979) and Judith Jacobsen (who died in 2004). He had four children by his first wife: Daniel, Kay, James, and Susan. Firor died on November 5, 2007, after a long battle with Alzheimer's disease.

== Career at HAO and NCAR ==
Firor left the Carnegie Institution of Washington in 1961 to become director of the High Altitude Observatory (HAO), a position he occupied until 1968. Whilst HAO director, Firor led the development of the new Solar Physics Division (SPD) of the American Astronomical Society (AAS), and became the SPD's founding chair. In 1968, he became the director of the National Center for Atmospheric Research (NCAR), of which HAO was a scientific division. He served as NCAR director until 1974, when Francis Bretherton became director. From 1974 to 1980, Firor served as executive director of NCAR, after which he became director of NCAR's advanced study program up to his retirement in 1996.

== Scientific publications ==
Firor wrote many papers on cosmic rays, radio sources in the universe, the Sun's atmosphere, and solar flares. He also participated in HAO expeditions to observe solar eclipses in New Guinea, Brazil, and Kenya. Later in his career, Firor took a keen interest in the intersection of science and society, and he became one of the earliest and most eloquent spokespeople on the dangers of human-induced climate change, testifying before Congressional committees and addressing a broad variety of audiences. His book, Our Changing Atmosphere (1990), received the Louis J. Battan Award from the American Meteorological Society. Firor and his second wife, Judith Jacobsen, co-authored The Crowded Greenhouse (2002), on the links between climate change and population growth.
