= Richard A. Anthes =

American meteorologist

- Born: March 9, 1944 (age 82); St. Louis, Missouri
- Education: B.S., University of Wisconsin, 1966 M.S., University of Wisconsin, 1967 Ph.D., University of Wisconsin, 1970
- Awards: AMS' Clarence Leroy Meisinger Award (January, 1980) AMS' Jule G. Charney Award (January, 1987) AGU's Atmospheric Sciences Section Bjerknes Lecture (1994) China's Friendship Award (2003)
- Scientific career
- Fields: Meteorology
- Workplaces: 1962 - 1967 (summers) Student Trainee, U.S. Weather Bureau, ESSA, NOAA 1966-1968 NSF Fellow, University of Wisconsin 1968-1971 Research Meteorologist, NOAA, National Hurricane Research Laboratory 1971-1977 Assistant and associate professor, The Pennsylvania State University 1977-1978 Research Professor, Naval Postgraduate School, Monterey, California 1978-1981 Professor, The Pennsylvania State University, University Park, Pennsylvania 1981-1986 Director, Atmospheric Analysis and Prediction Division, National Center for Atmospheric Research, Boulder, Colorado 1986-1988 Director, National Center for Atmospheric Research (NCAR), Boulder, Colorado 1988-2012 President, UCAR, Boulder, Colorado
- Thesis: A diagnostic model of the tropical cyclone in isentropic coordinates. University of Wisconsin, Madison, 1970, 184 pp. (1970)
- Doctoral advisor: Donald R. Johnson

Richard A. Anthes (born March 9, 1944) was a long time president of the University Corporation for Atmospheric Research (from 1988 to 2012). The Anthes Building in Boulder, Colorado, is the first UCAR-owned building to be named for an eminent scientist – and a living one at that.” His area of study at the University of Wisconsin, Madison, focused on hurricanes and tropical cyclones. Dr. Anthes taught as a professor for ten years at Pennsylvania State University before accepting a position at the National Center for Atmospheric Research as director of the Atmospheric and Prediction Division in 1981, a position he kept until 1986 when he became director of NCAR. In 1988, he started working as president of UCAR, and retired from that position in 2012. During his presidency at UCAR, he participated or chaired over forty different national committees for agencies such as NASA, NSF, and NOAA. He also established a program aimed at increasing participation (especially of minority professionals) in the atmospheric sciences called SOARS (Significant Opportunities in Atmospheric Research and Science).

== Books ==
Dr. Anthes has published a number of books:

Anthes, R. A., 1981: Instructor's Manual to Accompany The Atmosphere. 3rd ed. Merrill Publishing Company, Columbus.

Anthes, R. A., 1981: Current Mesoscale Meteorological Research in the United States. National Academies Press, Washington.

Anthes, R. A., J. J. Cahir, A. B. Fraser, and H. A. Panofsky, 1981: The Atmosphere. 3rd ed. Merrill Publishing Company, Columbus.

Anthes, R. A., 1982: Tropical Cyclones: Their Evolution, Structure and Effects. American Meteorological Society, Boston.

Cotton, W. R., and R. A. Anthes, 1992: Storm and Cloud Dynamics. Academic Press, San Diego.

Anthes, R. A., 1996: Meteorology. 7th ed. Macmillan Publishing Company, New York.

Anthes, R. A., 1997: Toward a New National Weather Service: An Assessment of the Advanced Weather Interactive Processing System: Operational Test and Evaluation of the First System Build. National Academies Press, Washington.

Anthes, R. A., M. Garstang, R. Simpson, and J. Simpson, eds., 2003: Hurricane! Coping with disaster: Progress and challenges since Galveston, 1900. American Geophysical Union, Washington.

Anthes, R. A., 2007: Earth Science and Applications From Space: National Imperatives for the Next Decade and Beyond. National Academies Press, Washington.

== Awards and honors ==
In 2003, Dr. Anthes was the winner of China's Friendship Award, which is the highest award presented to foreigners by the People's Republic of China and he was the first atmospheric scientist ever to receive this award. He also received two awards from the American Meteorological Society: the Clarence L. Meisinger Award in January, 1980, and the Jule G. Charney Award in January 1987.
