= Walter Orr Roberts =

American astronomer (1915–1990)

- Walt Roberts, circa 1960
- Born: August 20, 1915; West Bridgewater, Massachusetts, US
- Died: March 12, 1990 (aged 74); Boulder, Colorado, US
- Education: Amherst College, B.A. 1938 (physics); Harvard University, M.A. 1940, Ph.D. 1943 (astronomy)
- Spouse: Janet Naomi Smock
- Children: David Roberts; Alan Roberts; Jonathan Roberts; Jennifer Roberts-McCarthy
- Awards: Phi Beta Kappa, 1938; Hodgkins Medal, Smithsonian Institution, 1973; International Environmental Leadership Medal, United Nations, 1982; United Nations Environment Programme, North American Leadership Medal, 1989
- Scientific career
- Fields: Astronomy
- Workplaces: High Altitude Observatory, University of Colorado, National Center for Atmospheric Research, University Corporation for Scientific Research, American Association for the Advancement of Science, Aspen Institute for Humanistic Studies

Walter Orr Roberts (August 20, 1915 – March 12, 1990) was an American astronomer and atmospheric physicist, as well as an educator, philanthropist, and builder. He founded the National Center for Atmospheric Research and took a personal research interest for many years in the study of influences of the Sun on weather and climate.

== Early life and education ==
Walter Orr Roberts was born on August 20, 1915, in West Bridgewater, Massachusetts, to Ernest Marion Roberts and Alice Elliot Orr. He was the oldest of three children. He attained a Bachelor's degree in Physics from Amherst College in 1938, and a Masters and PhD in astronomy from Harvard University in 1940 and 1943. In 1940 he married Janet Smock.

== Career ==
=== High Altitude Observatory ===
From 1940 to 1946, Roberts was superintendent of the Climax Observing Station, Harvard College Observatory, in Climax Colorado. This site was chosen by Donald H. Menzel in 1939; Menzel also supervised the construction of the observatory and residence on the mining property of the Climax Molybdenum Company. The observatory was installed with a coronagraph in 1940, which had been developed and tested at the Oakridge Station of Harvard College Observatory (it was patterned after one developed by Bernard Lyot in the 1930s in France). At the Harvard College Observatory in Climax (elevation 11,520 feet), Roberts observed and concluded that changes in the corona affected radio communications, and in fact these changes provided advance warning of communication disturbances. This became important for WWII wartime security and the observatory work was classified and overseen by the Navy during this period. In 1945, after WWII, the National Bureau of Standards contracted the observatory for reports on solar activity. In 1946, the Climax Harvard College Observatory incorporated with the University of Colorado under CU President Robert L. Stearns's tenure and was renamed the High Altitude Observatory (HAO). At that time, he became the founding director of the High Altitude Observatory (HAO), and remained the director until 1961. HAO launched an Institute of Solar-Terrestrial Relations in January 1956 for a four-year period “to study the effects of the sun on weather with the hope that from this work would come an improvement in weather or climate forecasting based on analysis of variations in the emissions from the sun.” Subsequently he was the founding president of the University Corporation for Atmospheric Research (UCAR) and first director of the National Center for Atmospheric Research (NCAR).

=== University of Colorado Boulder: UCAR and NCAR ===
In the fall of 1956, Walter Orr Roberts was named head of the newly created Department of Astro-Geophysics in the graduate school by the Regents of the University of Colorado; instruction began in the fall of 1957.

In 1960, after the University Corporation for Atmospheric Research (UCAR) incorporated, Roberts was elected its first president. Boulder was chosen as the site for NCAR, and Roberts was named its inaugural director in 1960 (while continuing to direct HAO). The National Center for Atmospheric Research (NCAR) was established by UCAR in partnership with the National Science Foundation (NSF). “The basic purposes of NCAR are: (1) to conduct fundamental research on the processes of the atmosphere on a scope beyond that yet attempted; (2) to provide, or arrange for the provision of, research facilities, to be open to all scientists, that are beyond the capacity of universities or most research groups to acquire or maintain; (3) to provide a center at which various groups in the atmospheric sciences and closely related fields may meet to define goals and plan programs.” The Colorado Legislature appropriated $250,000 to buy 500 acres beneath the Flatirons just south of Boulder (known as Table Mountain) for the new center. I.M. Pei was selected as the architect in 1961. The resulting Mesa Laboratory, NCAR's flagship building, is considered an architectural masterpiece.

Orr Roberts and I.M. Pei meet in front of NCAR in Boulder, Colorado

By 1965, as the director of both UCAR and NCAR, Walter Orr Roberts presided over five branches of NCAR: the Advanced Study Program, the Laboratory of Atmospheric Sciences or LAS (which included a Summer Visitor's program and a Scientific Computing Facility), the High Altitude Observatory (HAO), the Facilities Division (which included the Research Aviation Facility, the Scientific Balloon Facility, a Library, Machine and Electronics Shops, and Field Observing Support for the Marshall Field Site, the Low-level Sounding System, and Radar Observations), and the Administrative and Support Services Division.

In an oral interview in 1987, Roberts “discusses how he came to be NCAR's first director, the purpose for creating a national center, the process for identifying NCAR's initial priorities, the issue of competition between NCAR and university programs, the debate regarding NCAR's focus on research with practical applications, and NCAR's early facilities. Roberts reflects on characteristics of a successful research center, his ideas about administration, and the importance of interdisciplinary research and international cooperation among the scientific community.”

Walter Orr Roberts played a significant role in establishing Boulder, Colorado, as a center for scientific research. Between the 1940s and 1970s, the city attracted institutions including HAO, UCAR, NCAR, the Central Radio Propagation Laboratory (CRPL) of the National Bureau of Standards, the National Institute of Standards and Technology (NIST), JILA, LASP, IBM, Ball Aerospace, and NOAA. Roberts was credited with helping coordinate collaboration among competing scientific organizations in the region.

=== Climate change ===
In 1979, Roberts and Henry Lansford published The Climate Mandate, which discussed climatic variation and its implications. Greenhouse Glasnost, which was discussed at a 1989 Sundance Symposium on Global Climate Change, was one outcome of this international exchange. Climate and climate change remain important areas of study for NCAR scientists.

From 1974–1981, Roberts served as Director for the Program of Food, Climate, and the World's Future at the Aspen Institute for Humanistic Studies. He taught a course in world environmental problems, which was conducted by computer communications, for the Western Behavioral Sciences Institute in La Jolla, California, from 1982–1990. The Climate Club: A Collection of 299 Provocations Written by Walter Orr Roberts as They Appeared in WBSI Teleconferences Between May 1984 and February 1990 was published by the Western Behavioral Sciences Institute in 1990. For decades, Roberts argued for action to halt anthropogenic global warming. In 1984, he published The Cold and the Dark with Paul R. Ehrlich, Carl Sagan, and Donald Kennedy.

== Investigation by HUAC ==
Throughout his career, Roberts sought cooperation and exchange with international (including Soviet) scientists. Some of these professional contacts caused him to be investigated by the House Un-American Activities Committee (HUAC) beginning in 1947. After failing to obtain a security clearance in 1950, he spent a day and a half at the Pentagon where he was “accused of having a close and sympathetic association with known Communist fronts”. His lawyer advised him to write his autobiography and obtain affidavits (which included a letter from Albert Einstein) proving he didn't attend a lecture he was accused of attending. An FBI report dated 7/1/47 states “ROBERTS, scientist and Director of the Climax Observatory, Climax, Colorado entertained Russian scientists, A. SERVANY and O. MELNIKOV at Climax 2/17-20/47.” After two redacted lines, the report continues “11/29/46; ROBERTS” articles in “Denver Post” secured and forwarded to Bureau. Informant reports ROBERTS plans to visit Russia shortly. Informants describe ROBERTS as publicity seeker; brilliant scientist; firm believer in international scientific exchange, especially with Russia of all atomic information; international do-gooder. ROBERTS stated that he sees little difference in economy of U.S.S.R. and U.S. ROBERTS is Chairman of Rocky Mountain Committee on Nuclear Energy, such Committee contains persons known to be Communist and Communist sympathizers. ROBERTS listed as a speaker for Denver Council of American-Soviet Friendship.” Walter Orr Roberts was ultimately cleared by the committee and given top secret security clearance in 1950.

== Personal life ==
Roberts was an elected member of both the American Academy of Arts and Sciences and the American Philosophical Society. The minor planet 3428 Roberts is named after him.

His wife, Janet Roberts, was a Boulder City Council member. They had four children including David Roberts.

Roberts died of cancer on March 12, 1990.
