= Donald Kennedy =

American biologist

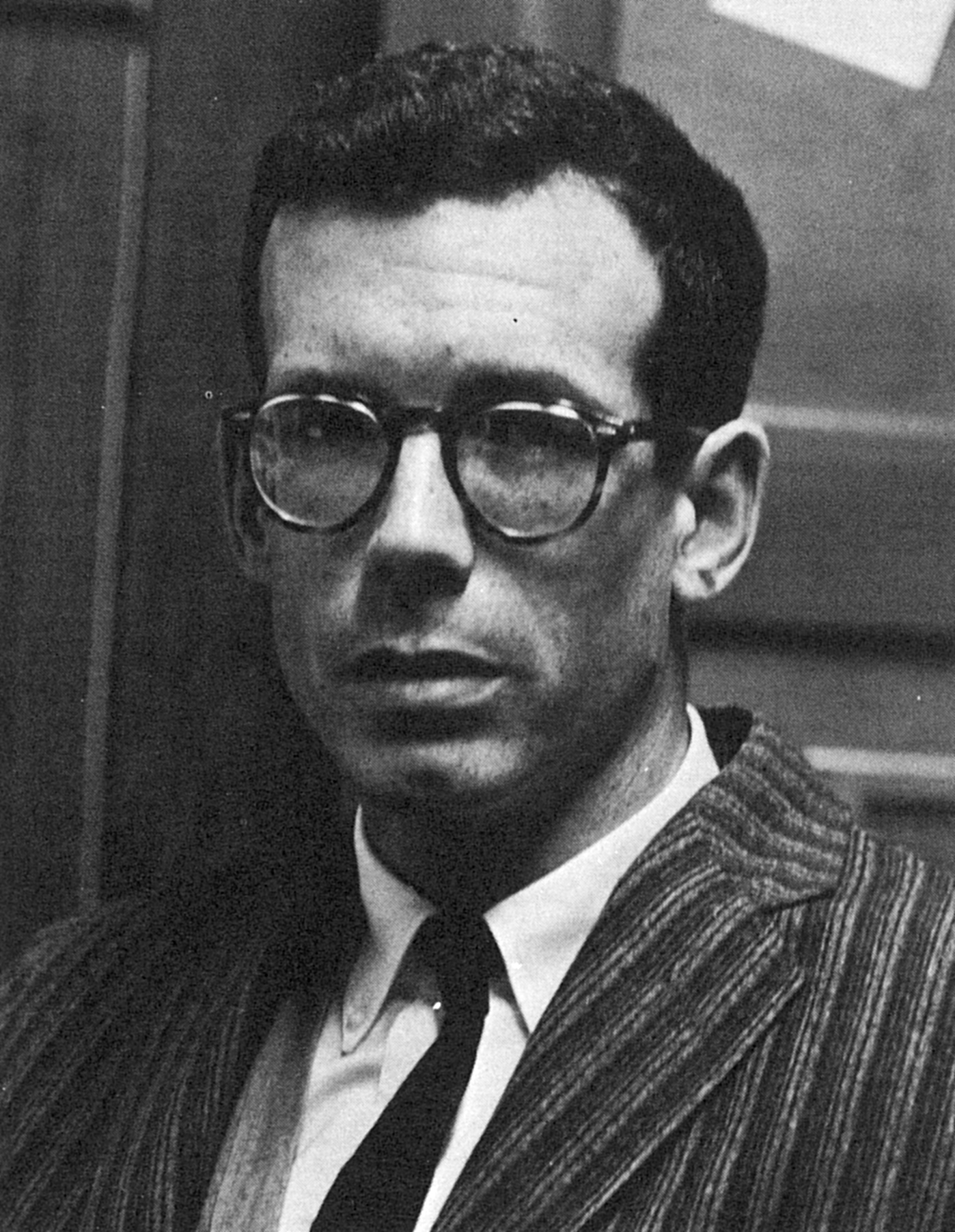
- Kennedy in 1964

8th President of Stanford University
- In office August 1, 1980 – September 1, 1992
- Preceded by: Richard Wall Lyman
- Succeeded by: Gerhard Casper

6th Provost of Stanford University
- In office 1979–1980
- Preceded by: Gerald J. Lieberman
- Succeeded by: Albert M. Hastorf

12th United States Commissioner of Food and Drugs
- In office April 4, 1977 – June 30, 1979
- President: Jimmy Carter
- Preceded by: Alexander M. Schmidt
- Succeeded by: Jere E. Goyan

Personal details
- Born: August 18, 1931 New York City, New York, U.S.
- Died: April 21, 2020 (aged 88) Redwood City, California, U.S.
- Spouses: Jeanne Dewey (divorced); Robin Hamill (m. 1987)
- Children: 4
- Education: Harvard University (AB, MS, PhD)
- Profession: Professor, journalist, scientist

Donald Kennedy (August 18, 1931 – April 21, 2020) was an American scientist, public administrator, and academic who served as the 12th United States commissioner of food and drugs from 1977 to 1979, as the eighth president of Stanford University from 1980 to 1992, and as the editor-in-chief of Science from 2000 to 2008.

He was later named president emeritus of Stanford University; Bing Professor of Environmental Science and Policy, emeritus; and senior fellow of the Freeman Spogli Institute for International Studies.

== Early life and education ==
Donald Kennedy was born on August 18, 1931, in New York City, the son of Barbara Bean and William Dorsey Kennedy. He attended Dublin School through high school and went on to attend Harvard University, where he received an A.B. degree in 1952, an M.S. degree in 1954, and a Ph.D. in 1956, all in Biology. His doctoral dissertation was titled Studies on the Frog Electroretinogram.

== Career ==
=== Teacher ===
From 1956 to 1960, Kennedy taught biology at Syracuse University, receiving tenure by 1960. His research included the patterns of neural action in crayfish, demonstrating some of the connection principles among nerve cells that impose the sequences underlying a behavioral event. Kennedy showed that some single neurons, which he termed "command" neurons, could produce a complex, fixed-action pattern of locomotory behavior.

Arriving at Stanford University as an assistant professor in 1960, Kennedy was granted tenure in 1962. In 1967 he was appointed chairman of the Department of Biology in the School of Humanities and Sciences. He was one of the founding faculty in the Program in Human Biology. Kennedy served ten years on the board of directors of the David and Lucile Packard Foundation, where he served as director from 1973 to 1977.

=== FDA Commissioner ===
For 26 months he served as Commissioner of the United States Food and Drug Administration during the Carter Administration, appointed by the Secretary of Health, Education, and Welfare, Joseph Califano, in April 1977. In the next two-plus years Kennedy and the FDA dealt with issues such as the fallout from the attempt to ban saccharin, and the risks of antibiotic resistance in humans from agricultural antibiotic use and worked on provisions of the proposed Drug Regulation Reform Act of 1978.

=== Stanford presidency ===
After stepping down from the FDA in June 1979, Kennedy returned to Stanford, where he served as provost. In 1980 he became president of Stanford University and served in that position until 1992. While president, he inaugurated overseas campuses in Kyoto, Japan, and Oxford, England, the Institute for International Studies, the Stanford Center for the Humanities, the Haas Public Service Center, and the Stanford-in-Washington campus. One of his focuses was on improving the quality of undergraduate education. In the mid-1980s, he led a $1.1 billion fundraising effort to improve the facilities of the university, and the total raised was $1.2 billion. In 1990 Kennedy hosted Mikhail Gorbachev on an international visit to Stanford. Over his tenure, Kennedy fostered the growth of the university's endowment to $2 billion, which was the fifth-largest in the United States. He also led Stanford to divest all investments in South Africa during apartheid after student protests, and changed the "Western Culture" credit requirements to "Cultures, Ideas, and Values" in an attempt to encompass non-Western cultures.

Kennedy resigned in 1992 following congressional hearings over whether the university improperly billed the government for research expense as part of the Stanford Indirect Costs Controversy, which included billing for widening his bed and for the purchase of antiques for his home. The issue was settled out of court, and led to no charges. According to The New York Times, "Stanford University and the Navy ... settled [the] fraud case involving research expenses, with the university repaying a small fraction of the Navy's original claim and the Navy saying that an investigation had found no wrongdoing by the university." Following his presidency, Kennedy wrote a memoir entitled A Place in the Sun: A Memoir.

=== Later career ===
He remained at Stanford after resigning from the presidency. In 1997 Kennedy published the book Academic Duty, which advocated for university professors to pay more attention to the teaching part of their duties, and to make an effort to connect their research with the wider public. From 2000 until 2008, he was editor-in-chief of Science, the weekly published by the American Association for the Advancement of Science. In 2010, he received Wonderfest's Carl Sagan Prize for Science Popularization. Kennedy was a fellow of the American Academy of Arts and Sciences, the American Academy for the Advancement of Science, the American Philosophical Society, and the California Academy of Sciences. According to his Stanford biography, Kennedy's research interests related to "policy on such trans-boundary environmental problems as: major land-use changes; economically-driven alterations in agricultural practice; global climate change; beyond coal; and alternative energy sources". He was president emeritus of Stanford University, Bing Professor of Environmental Science and Policy, and emeritus and senior fellow of the Freeman Spogli Institute for International Studies by courtesy.

== Personal life and death ==
Kennedy's first marriage, to Jeanne Dewey, ended in divorce. In 1987, Kennedy married Robin Hamill. Kennedy had two children from his first marriage and two stepchildren with Hamill.

Kennedy had a stroke in 2015 and in 2018 moved to Gordon Manor, a residential care home in Redwood City, California. He died there from COVID-19 on April 21, 2020, at age 88, during the COVID-19 pandemic in California.

== Bibliography ==
- Ehrlich, Paul R.; Sagan, Carl; Kennedy, Donald; Roberts, Walter Orr (1984). The Cold and the Dark: The World after Nuclear War. London: Sidgwick & Jackson. ISBN 0283991461. OCLC 848880075.
- Kennedy, Donald (1997). Academic Duty. Cambridge, Massachusetts: Harvard University Press. ISBN 0674002229. OCLC 476342946.
- Kennedy, Donald (1998). The Last of Your Springs. Stanford, California: Stanford Historical Society. ISBN 9780966424904. OCLC 39074223.
- Kennedy, Donald (2017). A Place in the Sun: A Memoir. Stanford, California: Stanford University Libraries. ISBN 9780911221619. OCLC 988256135.

Academic offices
Preceded by Gerald J. Lieberman	Provost of Stanford University; 1979–80	Succeeded by Albert M. Hastorf
Preceded by Richard W. Lyman	President of Stanford University; 1980–1992	Succeeded by Gerhard Casper
