= Mauna Loa Solar Observatory =

Observatory in Hawaii, US

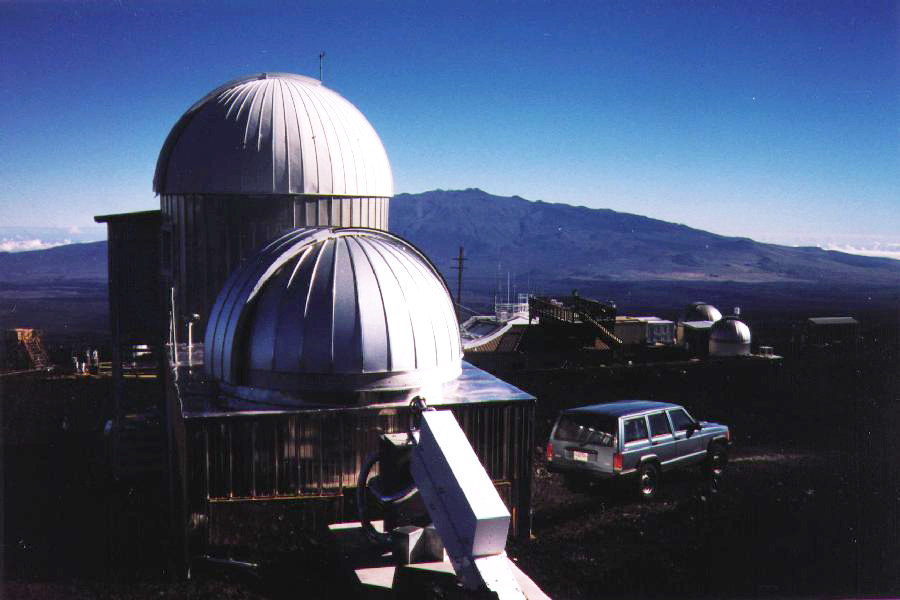
- MLSO domes on Mauna Loa
- Alternative names: ATLAS Mauna Loa
- Organization: National Center for Atmospheric Research
- Location: Mauna Loa, Hawaii
- Coordinates: 19.536°N 155.576°W
- Altitude: 3,394 meters (11,135 ft)
- Established: 1965
- Website: www2.hao.ucar.edu/mlso

Telescopes
- Upgraded Coronal Multi-channel Polarimeter: Coronagraph and polarimeter
- K-coronagraph: White-light coronagraph
- Location within Hawaii

The Mauna Loa Solar Observatory (MLSO) is a solar observatory located on the slopes of Mauna Loa on the island of Hawai'i in the U.S. state of Hawaii. Built in 1965, the MLSO is operated by the High Altitude Observatory (HAO), a laboratory within the National Center for Atmospheric Research (NCAR), and is situated on property managed by the Mauna Loa Observatory.

The MLSO is tasked with monitoring the Sun's atmosphere through observation of the chromosphere and corona. Studies of coronal mass ejections (CMEs) are also conducted at MLSO.

== Instruments ==
=== Upgraded Coronal Multi-channel Polarimeter ===
The Upgraded Coronal Multi-channel Polarimeter (UCoMP) is a 20 cm-aperture coronagraph with a polarimeter and a tunable birefringent filter. UCoMP images the Stokes parameters, doppler shift, and line width of visible and near-infrared emission lines from the solar corona. Its field of view extends above the solar limb from 1.03 to 1.95 solar radii with a spatial resolution of 3 arcseconds per pixel. UCoMP began collecting data in May 2021 and is an upgrade of the Coronal Multi-channel Polarimeter instrument. UCoMP is planned to act as a pathfinder instrument for the Coronal Solar Magnetism Observatory (COSMO) Large Coronagraph.

=== K-coronagraph ===
The COSMO K-coronagraph (K-Cor) is a 20 cm-aperture white-light coronagraph. It images the linearly polarized light from the continuous spectrum of the K-corona, which is produced by Thomson scattering of light from the photosphere by free electrons in the corona. Its field of view extends above the solar limb from 1.05 to 3 solar radii with a spatial resolution of 6 arcseconds per pixel and time cadence of 15 seconds. K-Cor went into service in September 2013, replacing the Mark-IV K-Coronameter.

=== Former instruments ===
- The Coronal Multi-channel Polarimeter (CoMP) monitored the magnetic field in the corona by recording the strength and polarization of light received from corona.
- The Precision Solar Photometric Telescope (PSPT) produces highly accurate images of the photosphere at five different wavelengths.
- The Mark-IV K-Coronameter (Mk4) produces polarization maps of the corona observed in white light.
- The Advanced Coronal Observing System (ACOS) is a set of instruments for monitoring the chromosphere on a shared mount.
- The Coronado Solarmax 60 (CS60) is a small refractor built by Meade Instruments which provides H-alpha disk and limb images.
- Chromospheric Helium-I Imaging Photometer (CHIP) observes at a wavelength which is an emission line for non-ionized helium (He I) in order to monitor the chromosphere.
- The Polarimeter for Inner Coronal Studies (PICS) produced H-alpha disk and limb digital images from 1994 to 1997. It was replaced by the CS60.
- The Digital Prominence Monitor (DPM) produced H-alpha disk and limb digital images from 1994 to 1997. It was replaced by the PICS.
- The Prominence Monitor (PMON) produced H-alpha disk and limb images on film from 1980 to 1994. It was replaced by the DPM.
- The Mark-III K-Coronameter (Mk3) operated from 1980 to 1998, and was replaced by the MK4.
- The Mark-II K-Coronameter (MK2), named the Coronal Activity Monitor, operated from 1968 to 1980. It was developed specifically for study of minute-to-minute transient coronal phenomena.
- The Mark-I K-Coronameter (MK1) was brought over from Haleakala in 1965 (where the observing program had been carried out in collaboration with the University of Hawaii), and operated on Mauna Loa until 1968.

== See also ==
- Mauna Kea Observatories
- List of solar telescopes
- List of astronomical observatories
