= The Cold and the Dark =

1984 book by Paul R. Ehrlich, Carl Sagan, Donald Kennedy and Walter Orr Roberts

The Cold and the Dark: The World after Nuclear War
- Author: Paul R. Ehrlich, Carl Sagan, Donald Kennedy, and Walter Orr Roberts
- Publisher: Norton
- Publication date: 1984
- ISBN: 978-0-393-01870-7

The Cold and the Dark: The World after Nuclear War is a 1984 book by Paul R. Ehrlich, Carl Sagan, Donald Kennedy, and Walter Orr Roberts.

== Background ==
It makes dramatic long-lasting climate predictions of the effect a nuclear winter would have on the Earth, an event that is suggested by the authors to follow both a city countervalue strike during a nuclear war, and especially following strikes on oil refineries and fuel depots.

The book was released following a highly publicised 1983 study co-authored by Sagan published in the journal Science.
