= High Altitude Observatory =

Observatory in Hawaii, US

- Organization: National Center for Atmospheric Research
- Location: Boulder, Colorado; Hawaiian Acres, Hawaii
- Coordinates: 19°32′10″N 155°34′34″W
- Established: 8 September 1940
- Website: www2.hao.ucar.edu
- Location within Hawaii

The High Altitude Observatory (HAO) is a laboratory of the US National Center for Atmospheric Research (NCAR). HAO operates the Mauna Loa Solar Observatory on Hawaii and a research institute in Boulder, Colorado.

Its staff conduct research and provide support and facilities for the solar-terrestrial physics research community. Topics covered include solar physics, the heliosphere, and the effects of space weather on Earth's magnetosphere, ionosphere, and upper atmosphere.

HAO was originally founded in 1940 as a branch of the Harvard College Observatory, was transferred to the University of Colorado in the late 1940s, before becoming part of NCAR when the latter was founded in 1960.

== Mission and vision ==
HAO's mission is to understand the behavior of the Sun and its impact on the Earth, to support, enhance, and extend the capabilities of the university community and the broader scientific community, nationally and internationally, and to foster the transfer of knowledge and technology. As articulated in its Strategic Plan for 2011–2015, HAO's vision is to: Perform world-leading science to understand fundamentally and with predictive capability the sources and nature of solar and geospace variability; Provide scientific leadership and facilities to serve the wider community in common pursuit of these science objectives, and both support and benefit from the NCAR community; Support the education and training of early-career researchers in solar-terrestrial physics and instrumentation; and Provide advocacy for solar-terrestrial physics, promoting its results, and articulating its societal importance, to the rest of NCAR, the NSF, the university community, and the public.

HAO's telescopes are located at its Mauna Loa Solar Observatory, near the summit of that volcano on the big island of Hawaii. NCAR's solar observatory shares space on the campus of NOAA's larger Mauna Loa Observatory. HAO's researchers are based at NCAR headquarters, in Boulder, Colorado.

== Eclipse expeditions ==
1952 - Khartoum, Sudan This was a joint HAO – Naval Research Laboratory expedition, which obtained 50 spectra of the eclipse features of the sun.

1958 – Pukapuka, Cook Islands in the Pacific This was a joint HAO – Sacramento Peak expedition that was unable to obtain a single photo due to rainstorms.

1959 – Fuertaventura, Canary Islands of Spain A joint HAO – Sacramento Peak expedition

1962 – Lae, New Guinea

1963 – Alaska and Canada

1965 – Bellingshausen Island, South Pacific

1966 – Pulacayo, Bolivia

This photograph of the Sun's outer atmosphere, or corona, was taken by a research team from the National Center for Atmospheric Research's High Altitude Observatory during a total solar eclipse on 12 November 1966, at Pulacayo, Bolivia. It was taken with a special camera designed by Gordon Newkirk of NCAR.

1970 - San Carlos Youtepec, Mexico

This photograph of the Sun's outer atmosphere, or corona, was taken by a research team from the National Center for Atmospheric Research's High Altitude Observatory during a total solar eclipse on 7 March 1970. It was taken at an altitude of 8,800 feet (2,700 meters) on a remote mountain site in southern Mexico with a special camera designed by Gordon Newkirk of NCAR.

1972 – Cap Chat, Canada

1973 – Loiengalani, Kenya

This color-enhanced photograph of the Sun's outer atmosphere, or corona, was made by a research team from the National Center for Atmospheric Research's High Altitude Observatory during a total solar eclipse on 30 June 1973 at Loiyengalani, Kenya. It was taken with a special camera designed by Gordon Newkirk of NCAR.

1980 – Palem, India HAO in collaboration with Southwestern at Memphis College, Tennessee

1981 – Tarma, Siberia, USSR HAO in collaboration with the Astronomical Council of the Academy of Sciences of the USSR, Moscow

1983 – Tanjung Kodok, Indonesia

1988 - Mindanao, Philippines In Provocation No. 214, Dr. Roberts discusses the High Altitude Observatory (HAO) expedition to the Philippines to observe the eclipse of March 18. HAO expedition staff included Dick Fisher, Kristy Rock, Mike McGrath, and Lee Lacey.

1991 - Mauna Loa, Hawaii HAO in collaboration with Rhodes College, Tennessee

1994 - Putre, Chile

1998 – Curaçao, Dutch Antilles

2012 – Palm Cove, Queensland, Australia

2017 - Preparing for the 2017 Eclipse

== History ==
Walter Orr Roberts was a graduate student under Donald Menzel at Harvard, and helped him set up a solar telescope at the Oak Ridge Station of Harvard College Observatory. In 1939, Menzel located a site for a western station in the Colorado mountains. In his unpublished memoirs, Menzel writes: “I returned the following summer, supervised the building of the observatory and an observer’s residence [on the mining property of Climax Molybdenum Company at Climax, Colorado], and started the installation of the equipment.

“This branch of the Harvard College Observatory informally opened on 8 September 1940 at Climax, Colorado (elevation 11,520 ft.). Its sole purpose was to study the sun, using the first coronagraph in the western hemisphere.”

Walter Roberts and his wife arrived in the summer of 1940, and remained at the observatory for 7 years (throughout WWII and beyond). Menzel continues: “In the summer of 1940, however, Walter and I quickly solved the problems of our coronagraph. After I left, he soon had it working properly. He obtained daily records of the spectrum of the corona, which furnished us with a valuable index of solar activity.

At Climax, Walter Roberts quickly proved observationally what most astronomers had previously suspected, that the corona itself rotated with the same period as the solar surface, in something over twenty-five days. He initiated a study of the fine structure of the solar atmosphere, determining the behavior of what he called “spicules,” a phenomenon that I had myself briefly discussed while at Lick Observatory. These studies formed the basis for his doctorate thesis submitted for the degree a year or two later.”

Work at the observatory was classified during WWII because of its value in predicting radio disturbances from the study of the corona. "The wartime work of the observatory was done under the auspices of the Navy, although overall direction remained in the hands of Harvard.” Post WWII, The National Bureau of Standards contracted the observatory for reports on solar activity. In 1946, CU Boulder became a joint sponsor with Harvard of the observatory, while the Central Radio Propagation Laboratory (CRPL) of the NSB funded HAO's operational costs. The headquarters of HAO was moved to Boulder in 1947. Private philanthropy provided most of the budget until the Sputnik crisis in 1957, after which federal government funding greatly increased.

== Directors ==
The founding director of the High Altitude Observatory was Walter Orr Roberts. The current director is Holly R. Gilbert. A list of all HAO directors since the founding of the observatory is given below.

HAO Director	Dates in office
Walter Orr Roberts	1940 - 1960
John W. Firor	1961 - 1968
Gordon A. Newkirk	1968 - 1979
Robert M. MacQueen	1980 - 1986
Peter A. Gilman	1987 - 1989
Thomas E. Holtzer	1990 - 1995
Michael T. F. Knölker	1995 - 2009
Michael J. Thompson	2010 - 2014
Scott W. McIntosh	2014 - 2019
Holly R. Gilbert	2020 -

== See also ==
- List of astronomical observatories
