= Antonio Busalacchi Jr. =

American academic

- Education: B.S, Florida State University, 1977; M.S, Florida State University, 1980; Ph.D., Florida State University, 1982
- Occupation: Oceanographer

Antonio Busalacchi Jr. is the president of the Boulder, Colorado-based University Corporation for Atmospheric Research (UCAR) since 2016.

Prior to joining UCAR, Busalacchi was a professor in the Department of Atmospheric and Oceanic Science, director of the Earth System Science Interdisciplinary Center (ESSIC) and Chair of the Council on the Environment (ConE) at the University of Maryland. He has served as chair of the Joint Scientific Committee of the World Climate Research Programme. and co-chair of the National Research Council's Decadal Survey for Earth Science and Applications from Space. He has also served as a head scientist of a division of the National Aeronautics and Space Administration.

In 2016, Busalacchi was elected as a member into the National Academy of Engineering for the understanding of tropical oceans in coupled climate systems via remotely sensed observations and for international leadership of climate prediction/projection research. In 2023, he was made an honorary member and fellow of the International Union of Geodesy and Geophysics.
