= University Corporation for Atmospheric Research =

US nonprofit higher education consortium

The University Corporation for Atmospheric Research (UCAR) is a US nonprofit consortium of more than 100 colleges and universities providing research and training in the atmospheric and related sciences. UCAR manages the National Center for Atmospheric Research (NCAR) and provides additional services to strengthen and support research and education through its community programs. Its headquarters, in Boulder, Colorado, include NCAR's Mesa Laboratory, designed by I.M. Pei.

== History ==
UCAR was established in 1959 by faculty from 14 universities to support the atmospheric sciences.

In 1960, the group's first major action, in partnership with the National Science Foundation, was to establish NCAR. Since then, UCAR has managed NCAR on behalf of NSF to address pressing scientific and societal needs involving the atmosphere and its interactions with the oceans, land, and Sun—what is now called Earth system science.

== Community programs ==
UCAR's role in supporting and complementing the work of academia has grown to include new research, service, and education efforts, including:

- COMET Program - offers professional training on site and online in meteorology, weather hazards, hydrology, oceanography, emergency management, and environmental science
- COSMIC Program - supports satellite and ground-based observations and research using GPS technology for meteorology, climate, and ionospheric studies
- GLOBE Program - provides hands-on, school-based learning and collaboration with a global network of students, scientists, and educators
- Joint Office for Science Support - supports community research, conference, and field projects
- National Science Digital Library Resource Center and Digital Learning Sciences - supports and sustains community digital education projects
- Unidata Program - provides streaming observational data to university classrooms and researchers around the world
- Visiting Scientist Programs - places postdoctoral fellows and visiting scientists at partner institutions

The organization hosts numerous workshops, community meetings, and opportunities for collaboration throughout the year.

== Governance and funding ==
As of 2016, UCAR comprises 129 member colleges and universities and 52 international affiliates. The organization has a total of 1,390 staff, including 877 at NCAR and 282 engaged in community programs. Total expenditures for fiscal year 2024 were approximately $311 million.

UCAR and NCAR are headquartered in Boulder, Colorado, spread across four campuses. Ancillary activities take place in Cheyenne, Wyoming, Washington, D.C., and in about 15 other states.

Walter Orr Roberts was UCAR's first president. Antonio J. Busalacchi Jr. served as UCAR's president from August 2016 to May 2026, before stepping down and being succeeded by current interim president Eric J. Barron.

== List of members ==
- Appalachian State University
- Arizona State University
- Brown University
- California Institute of Technology
- Central Michigan University
- Clemson University
- Coastal Carolina University
- College at Brockport
- College of Charleston
- Colorado State University
- Columbia University
- Cornell University
- Dartmouth College
- Drexel University
- Duke University
- Embry-Riddle Aeronautical University
- Florida Institute of Technology
- Florida State University
- George Mason University
- Georgia Institute of Technology
- Hampton University
- Harvard University
- Howard University
- Indiana University
- Iowa State University
- Jackson State University
- Johns Hopkins University
- Louisiana State University
- Massachusetts Institute of Technology
- McGill University
- Metropolitan State University of Denver
- Michigan State University
- Michigan Technological University
- Millersville University
- Mississippi State University
- Naval Postgraduate School
- Desert Research Institute
- New Mexico Institute of Mining & Technology
- New York University
- North Carolina A&T University
- North Carolina State University
- Northern Vermont University-Lyndon
- Old Dominion University
- Oregon State University
- Pennsylvania State University
- Plymouth State University
- Princeton University
- Purdue University
- Rice University
- Rutgers University
- San Diego State University
- St. Cloud State University
- Saint Louis University
- San Francisco State University
- San José State University
- Scripps Institute, University of California, San Diego
- South Dakota School of Mines & Technology
- Stanford University
- University at Albany
- SUNY Oswego
- Stony Brook University
- Texas A&M University
- Texas A&M University, Corpus Christi
- Texas State University
- Texas Tech University
- United States Naval Academy
- Universidad Metropolitana
- University of Alabama
- University of Alabama in Huntsville
- University of Alaska, Fairbanks
- University of Arizona
- University of British Columbia
- University of California, Berkeley
- University of California, Davis
- University of California, Irvine
- University of California, Los Angeles
- University of Chicago
- University of Colorado
- University of Connecticut
- University of Delaware
- University of Denver
- University of Georgia
- University of Hawaiʻi at Mānoa
- University of Houston
- University of Illinois at Urbana-Champaign
- University of Iowa
- University of Kansas
- University of Louisiana at Monroe
- University of Maine
- University of Maryland, Baltimore County
- University of Maryland, College Park
- University of Massachusetts Amherst
- University of Massachusetts Lowell
- University of Miami
- University of Michigan
- University of Minnesota, Twin Cities
- University of Missouri
- University of Nebraska–Lincoln
- University of New Hampshire
- University of North Carolina at Asheville
- University of North Dakota
- University of Northern Colorado
- University of Oklahoma
- University of Rhode Island
- University of Saskatchewan
- University of Texas at Arlington
- University of Texas at Austin
- University of Texas at El Paso
- University of Toronto
- University of Utah
- University of Virginia
- University of Washington
- University of Wisconsin-Madison
- University of Wisconsin-Milwaukee
- University of Wyoming
- Utah State University
- Valparaiso University
- Washington State University
- Western Illinois University
- Woods Hole Oceanographic Institution
- Yale University
- York University

== UCAR Presidents ==
A list of all UCAR presidents is given below.

UCAR President	Dates in office
Walter Orr Roberts	1960 - 1974
Francis P. Bretherton	1974 - 1980
Robert White	1980 - 1983
Clifford Murino	1983 - 1988
Richard A. Anthes	1988 - 2012
Thomas Bogdan	2012 - 2015
Michael Thompson (interim)	2015 - 2016
Antonio J. Busalacchi	2016 -

In addition to NSF sponsorship, funding includes grants from and contracts with the National Oceanic and Atmospheric Administration (NOAA), National Aeronautics and Space Administration (NASA), the Department of Defense (DOD), Federal Aviation Administration (FAA), Department of Energy (DOE), Environmental Protection Agency (EPA), and other agencies and organizations.

== See also ==
- Carolyn Brinkworth, ACO officer for UCAR
