= National Center for Atmospheric Research =

US federally funded research and development center

NCAR National Center for Atmospheric Research

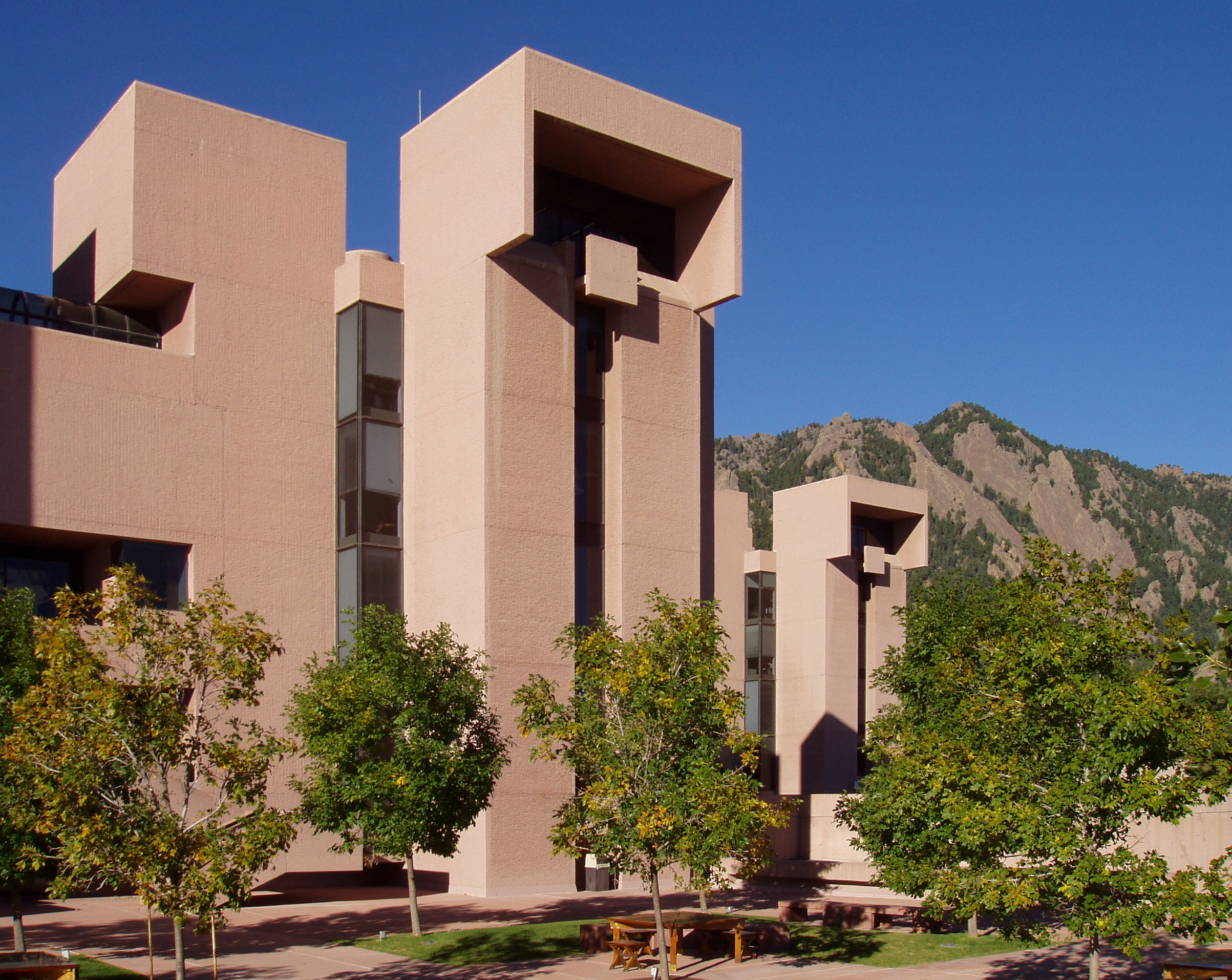
- NCAR Mesa Laboratory, Boulder, Colorado
- Established: 1960
- Director: Gretchen Mullendore (interim)
- Staff: Nearly 1,400
- Location: Boulder, Colorado, United States; 39.97815°N 105.27492°W
- Website: ncar.ucar.edu

The National Center for Atmospheric Research (NCAR /ˈɛnkɑːr/) is a federally funded research and development center headquartered in Boulder, Colorado, United States. Founded in 1960, NCAR is sponsored by the National Science Foundation (NSF) and managed by the University Corporation for Atmospheric Research (UCAR).

NCAR's laboratories focus on topics within Earth system science, such as climate science, meteorology, atmospheric chemistry, the Sun and space weather, and environmental and societal impacts of weather and climate. Its laboratories provide the scientific community with specialized instrumentation, research aircraft, supercomputers, atmospheric models, and datasets for conducting research in Earth system science.

NCAR manages multiple facilities, including the Mesa Laboratory headquarters in Boulder, Colorado; the NCAR-Wyoming Supercomputing Center in Cheyenne, Wyoming; and the Mauna Loa Solar Observatory on the island of Hawai'i in the state of Hawaii.

In December 2025, Office of Management and Budget Director Russ Vought announced the planned closure of NCAR, alleging climate alarmism.

== Tools and technologies ==
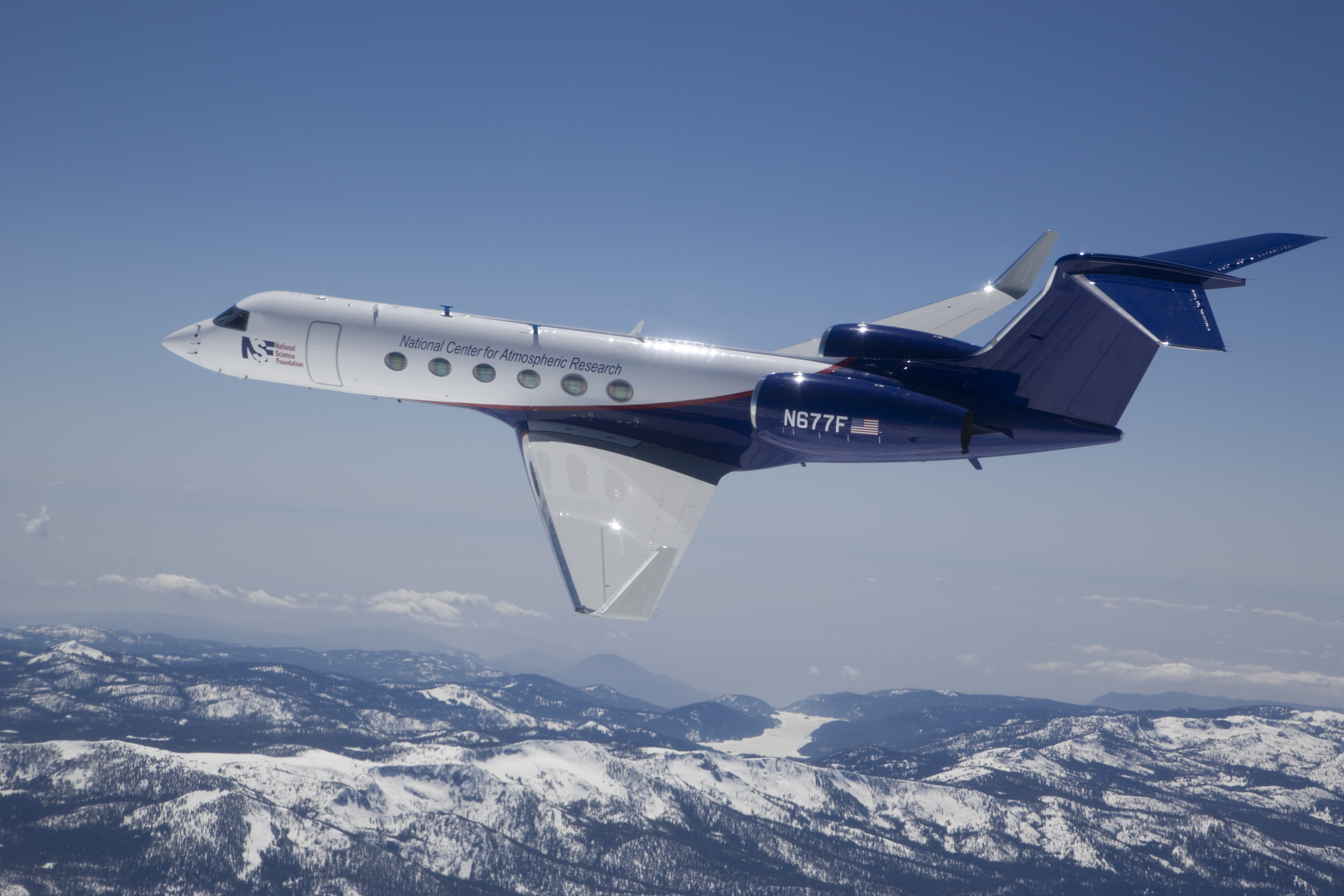
NSF/NCAR Gulfstream V research aircraft

NCAR was instrumental in developing lidar, light radar, now a key archaeological tool, as well as providing a broad array of tools and technologies to the scientific community for studying Earth's atmosphere, including,

- Specialized instruments to measure atmospheric processes
- Research aircraft
- High-performance computing and cyberinfrastructure, including supercomputers
- Mauna Loa Solar Observatory
- Cooperative field campaigns
- Atmospheric models of weather, chemical, solar, and climate processes, including cooperatively developed models such as:
  - Community Earth System Model (CESM)
  - Weather Research and Forecasting model (WRF)
  - Whole Atmosphere Community Climate Model (WACCM)
- Technology transfer to support societal needs
- Data sets, data services, and other resources
- NCAR Command Language (NCL), a programming language designed for use with climate and model data

== Research topics ==
The center is staffed by scientists, engineers, technicians, and support personnel. Key research areas include:

- Climate (Earth's past, present, and future climate; the greenhouse effect, global warming, and climate change; El Niño, La Niña, and other large-scale atmospheric patterns; drought, wildfires)
- Meteorology/Weather (short-term forecasts; weather forecasting and predictability; weather's effect on climate; hurricanes, tornadoes, and other severe storms; physical processes)
- Environmental and societal impacts (impacts of climate change on the natural and managed environment; interactions of weather, climate, and society; weather hazard systems for aviation and ground transportation; national security)
- Pollution and air chemistry (air pollution on local, regional, and global scales; air chemistry and climate; chemical evolution and transport in the atmosphere)
- The Sun and space weather (the structure of the Sun, from its interior to sunspots to the solar corona; the solar cycle; the Sun's effect on Earth's weather and climate; space weather)
- Other components of the Earth system (the effects on weather and climate of interactions with: the oceans and other components of Earth's water cycle, including sea ice, glaciers, and the rest of the cryosphere; forests, agriculture, urbanization and other types of land use)

Notable scientists on the current staff at the center include Tom Wigley, Kevin Trenberth, Clara Deser, and Caspar Ammann, and in past have included Paul Crutzen (Nobel Prize in chemistry, 1995); Paul Julian, who with colleague Roland Madden discovered the Madden–Julian oscillation; Stephen Schneider. Greg Holland initiated the multiscale modeling project "Predicting the Earth System Across Scales".

== Laboratories and programs ==
NCAR is currently organized into seven laboratories and two programs:

Laboratories

- Atmospheric Chemistry Observations and Modeling laboratory (ACOM)
- Climate and Global Dynamics laboratory (CGD)
- Computational & Information Systems Laboratory (CISL) – CISL was formerly known as the Scientific Computing Division (SCD). CISL manages and operates NCAR's supercomputers, mass storage system, networking, and other computing and cyberinfrastructure services. The Institute for Mathematics Applied to Geosciences (IMAGe) is a research division within CISL.
- Earth Observing Laboratory (EOL) – EOL was formerly known as the Atmospheric Technology Division (ATD). EOL manages and operates NCAR's lower atmosphere observing systems, including ground-based instrumentation and two research aircraft, on behalf of the NSF.
- High Altitude Observatory (HAO) – The oldest part of NCAR, HAO is NCAR's solar-terrestrial physics laboratory. Research foci are the Sun and the Earth's upper atmosphere. HAO operates the Mauna Loa Solar Observatory (MLSO).
- Mesoscale and Microscale Meteorology laboratory (MMM)
- Research Applications Laboratory (RAL)

Programs

- Advanced Study Program (ASP)
- Integrated Science Program (ISP)

NCAR's service to the universities and larger geosciences community is reinforced by the offerings of UCAR's community programs.

== Funding and management ==
NCAR is managed by the nonprofit UCAR and is one of the NSF's Federally Funded Research and Development Centers, with approximately 95% of its funding coming from the federal government. However, it is not a federal agency and its employees are not part of the federal personnel system. NCAR employs about 761 staff. Its annual expenditures in fiscal year 2015 were $167.8 million.

On December 17, 2025, Russell Vought, director of the White House Office of Management and Budget (OMB), announced that the National Science Foundation would dismantle NCAR. In his statement, he said that the center is "one of the largest sources of climate alarmism in the country". This is part of the battle over climate change research undertaken by Donald Trump's second presidency since January 2025, Vought being involved in Project 2025 of which this is one component.

Colorado's Senators made multiple attempts to ensure future funding for the institute. As of January 2026, the future funding prospects remained unclear. Nevertheless, on March 16, UCAR filed a lawsuit against the NSF, NOAA, the Office of Management and Budget, the Department of Commerce, and the directors of those agencies to block the dismantling of NCAR, alleging political retaliation due to the Trump administration's opposition of Colorado's political policies. UCAR then filed a motion requesting a preliminary injunction on April 3 to temporarily bar federal agencies from breaking up NCAR. On June 1, Senior Colorado District Judge R. Brooke Jackson granted UCAR's request, temporarily blocking the breakup of NCAR, ruling that the proposal by the Trump administration was politically motivated.

The state of Colorado also alleges that the cuts are efforts to punish the state for convicting former Mesa County clerk Tina Peters of felony election tampering. On December 15, 2025 (two days before the cuts were announced and four days after Trump issued Peters a "symbolic pardon") deputy assistant to the president Emily Underwood had scheduled a "brainstorm call" with four cabinet agencies and the OMB "to discuss immediate actions that your department or agency can take with respect to Colorado." The meeting was also followed by cuts to SNAP, and Department of Transportation funding to Colorado.

== Directors ==
The founding director of NCAR was Walter Orr Roberts. The current interim director is Gretchen Mullendore, succeeding Everette Joseph upon his resignation on November 13, 2026.

NCAR director	Dates in office
Walter Orr Roberts	1960–1968
John W. Firor	1968–1974
Francis P. Bretherton	1974–1980
Wilmot N. Hess	1980–1986
Richard A. Anthes	1986–1988
Robert Serafin	1989–2000
Timothy L. Killeen	2000–2008
Eric J. Barron	2008–2010
Roger M. Wakimoto	2010–2013
Maura Hagan	2013 (interim director)
James W. Hurrell	2013–2018
Vanda Grubišić	2018 (interim director)
Scott McIntosh	2019 (interim director)
Everette Joseph	2019–2026
Gretchen Mullendore	2026–present (interim director)
