= Military of the Ming dynasty =

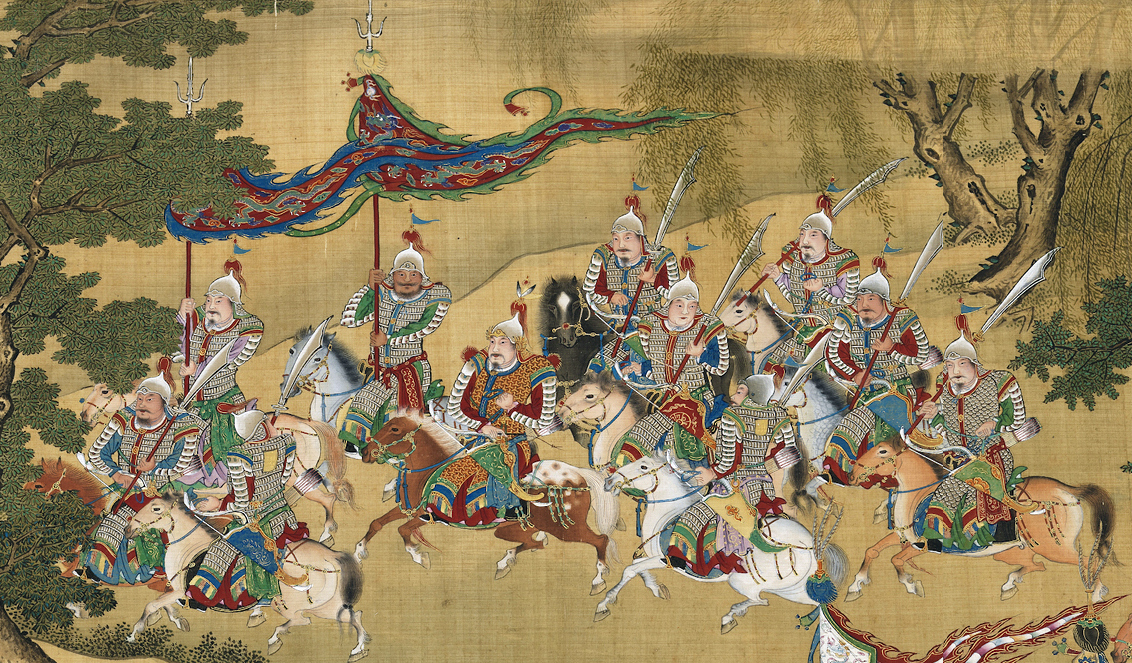
Ming cavalry, as depicted in the Departure Herald

The military of the Ming dynasty was the military apparatus of China from 1368 to 1644. It was established from the Red Turban rebel forces in the late Yuan dynasty under the leadership of Zhu Yuanzhang, who later became its founding emperor as the Hongwu Emperor.

Like many aspects of Ming politics and society, the military combined traditional Chinese elements—particularly those traceable to the Tang dynasty—with Mongol influences inherited from the Yuan. The new imperial army was initially organised along largely hereditary lines, with manpower drawn from self-sufficient agricultural communities across the empire. Soldiers were grouped into guards (wei) and battalions (suo), forming what is known as the weisuo system. This system declined less than a century after the dynasty's founding, around 1450, and was ultimately abandoned in favor of the extensive use of mercenaries and salaried troops during the 16th century.

At its outset, the military included substantial cavalry forces skilled in mounted archery in the Turco-Mongol style. Only in the 16th century did it begin to make widespread use of modern firearms of Western type, increasingly equipping infantry units organized in structured formations.

== Background ==
The Ming emperors from Hongwu to Zhengde continued policies of the Mongol-led Yuan dynasty such as hereditary military institutions, dressing themselves and their guards in Mongol-style clothing and hats, promoting archery and horseback riding, and having large numbers of Mongols serve in the Ming military. Until the late 16th century Mongols still constituted one-in-three officers serving in capital forces like the Embroidered Uniform Guard, and other peoples such as Jurchens were also prominent. A cavalry-based army modeled on the Yuan military was favoured by the Hongwu and Yongle Emperors.

Contrary to the stereotype that the Confucian Ming were disinterested in the military, the Ming poured enormous resources such as landholdings into upkeeping its military, which also constituted the biggest portion of the state budget. The Ming deliberately placed the military and civilian officials in opposition to each other for checks and balances. Troops often feuded, looted, evaded tax or resisted law enforcement in defiance of civilian officials, prompting the court to place civilian officials to supervise the military.

At the Guozijian Academy, equestrianism and archery were emphasized by the Hongwu Emperor in addition to Confucian classics, also being required in the Imperial Examinations. Archery and equestrianism were added to the exam by Hongwu in 1370 just as archery and equestrianism were required for non-military officials at the College of War (武舉) in 1162 by Emperor Xiaozong of the Song dynasty.

== Guard battalion system ==
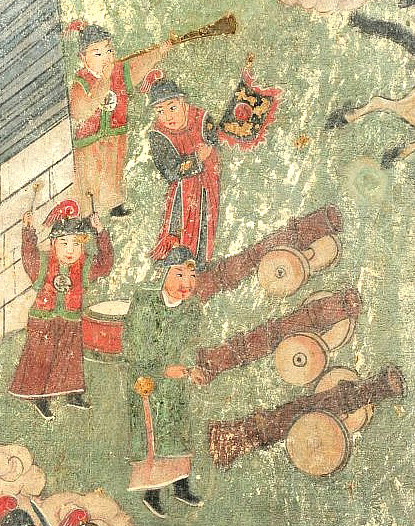
Ming artillerymen.

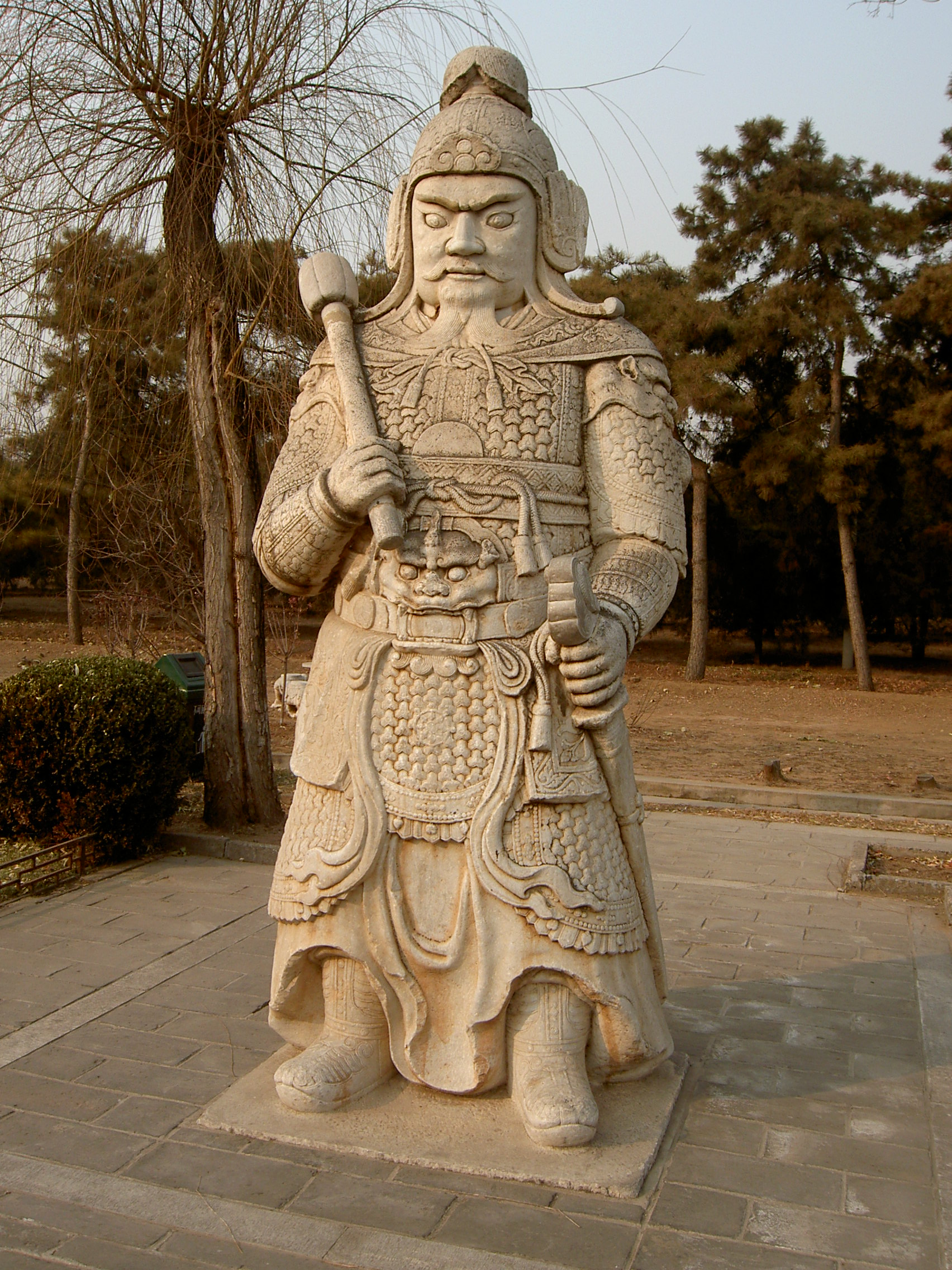
Ming tomb guardian in mountain pattern armour holding a mace

The Ming founder Zhu Yuanzhang set up a system of hereditary soldiery inspired by Mongol-style garrisons and the fubing system of the Northern Wei, Sui and Tang dynasties. Hereditary soldiers were meant to be self-sufficient. They provided their own food via military farms (tun tian) and rotated into training and military posts such as the capital, where specialized drilling with firearms was provided.

These hereditary soldiers were grouped into guards (wei) and battalions (suo), otherwise known as the wei-suo system. A guard consisted of 5,600 men, each guard was divided into battalions of 1,120 men (qiānhù), each battalion contained 10 companies of 112 men (bǎihù), each company contained two platoons of 56 men (zǒngqí), and each platoon contained five squads of 11 or 12 men (xiǎoqí).

Most of the soldiers in Ming's army came from military households, which consisted of about 20 percent of households in the early Ming period. Each military household was required to provide one man to serve in the army. If that man died, the household was required to send another.

There were four ways to become a military household. The first was for the family to be descended from a “fellow campaigner” who took part in the wars of the Ming founder. The family could also be descended from a soldier serving one of the enemies of the Ming founder but became incorporated into Ming troops after defeat. Those convicted of criminal offences could also be sentenced to serve in the military. But by the fifteenth century, criminal conviction no longer resulted in a normal household's conversion into military household. Punitive service was made non-hereditary. Lastly, soldiers were also recruited through a draft.

=== Command structure ===
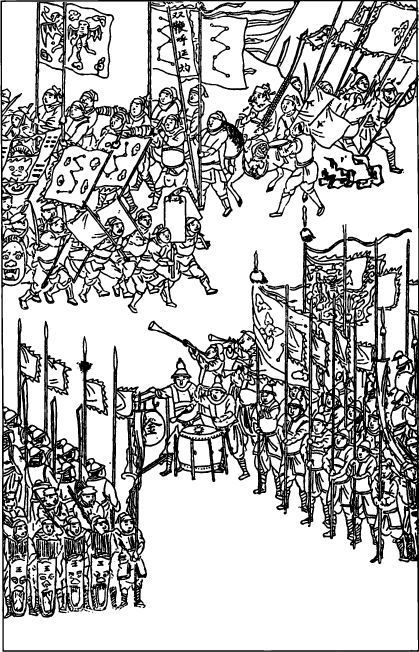
Ming shieldbearers (bottom left)

The guard battalions outside the capital were placed under local provincial military commanders. Those in Beijing were placed under the joint command of the Ministry for War and five grand military commanders, which reflected the separation of power and command. The Ministry issued orders to be carried out by the commanders.

Some officers were recruited through the military version of the imperial examinations, which emphasized horse archery, but not enough to impose a quality standard. These exams did however produce a few notable individuals such as Qi Jiguang and Yu Dayou.

In the late Ming dynasty, Ming army units had become dominated by hereditary officers who would spend long periods of ten or twelve years in command instead of the usual practice of constant rotation, and the Central Military Command had lost much of its control over regional armies. Zongdu Junwu, or Supreme Commanders, were appointed throughout the empire to oversee the fiscal and military affairs in the area of his jurisdiction, but they became increasingly autonomous in later periods.

=== Social status and decline ===
Soldiering was one of the lowest professions in the Ming dynasty. Military officers were not only subordinate to civil officials, but generals and soldiers alike were degraded, treated with fear, suspicion, and distaste. Military service enjoyed far less prestige than its civil counterpart due to its hereditary status and because most soldiers were illiterate.

The guard battalion system went into decline from 1450 to 1550 and the military capacity of hereditary soldiers declined substantially due to corruption and mismanagement. Some officers used their soldiers as construction gangs, some were too oppressive, others were too old and unfit for service, and many did not observe the proper rotational drilling schedule. In the 16th century official registers listed three million hereditary soldiers, but contemporary observers noted that the actual number of troops was around 845,000, and of that only about 30,000 cavalry. Modern historians estimated that by 1587, some province's actual army strengths could hit a mere 2% of nominal strength. The effectiveness of the Ming's now much smaller army was also considered pitiful, the capital armies being "old and weak lackeys of central government officials." When Altan Khan invaded China in 1550 (even setting the suburbs of Beijing on fire), the Ming could only muster about 60,000 troops to counter him, who then routed at the sight of the Mongols. A particularly extreme example came in 1555, when according to Ming records, a mere 60 pirates in a single ship landed in Nanjing. The city and its surrounding area was nominally garrisoned by 120,000 troops. Despite this, these 60 pirates encountered little resistance for the next three months, when they looted and burned towns around the area, killing four thousand people and rampaging over a thousand miles before the government could muster the strength to crush them.

Soldiers were also assigned tasks unrelated to warfare and combat. One of the primary military assignments in the early stages of the Ming empire was farming plots of land. Soldiers were often subject to exploitation from higher-ups in the army; they did menial tasks such as chopping down trees and picking herbs for the sole benefit of their superiors. The Ming sometimes utilized soldiers as transport workers to move grain and other foodstuffs throughout the empire. Soldiers were essentially no different than hired help due to the fact that they were often assigned to various menial tasks requiring manual labor. Officers were known to seize the lands of military colonies and convert them into their private estates, and subsequently force their troops into becoming their serfs. Other officers accepted bribes from soldiers to be exempted from military drill, and used other troops as menial labour. Corruption was so lucrative that the sons of merchants were known to bribe officials for appointments as army officers so as to exhort bribes from soldiers in exchange for drill exemption, or to register their own servants as soldiers so as to embezzle their rations. Desertion from the weisuo became commonplace.

The military was not the most profitable occupation and thus soldiers had to rely on other means to make money aside from the salary given by the government. The most straightforward method was to kill more enemy soldiers, which would grant them a reward for each soldier killed in battle. Some soldiers defected from the army and turned to banditry because they did not have enough food to eat.

Complicating the matter was that soldiers of the same rank did not share the same authority. Soldiers who had more wealth were able to bribe their superiors with money and other gifts increased their standing and status within the army.

Since most did not want to serve in the army, family members who chose to be soldiers might get some sort of compensation from other male family members. For example, they could become the next "descent-line heir" even if they were not the eldest son, as was tradition, by volunteering to enlist. The "descent-line heir" was the right to hold a special ritual role within the clan and hence enhance one's social status since the heir would inherit his father's privileges. In a military family, soldiers who were assigned to locations far away from their ancestral homes often saw their relationships with their extended family decline. To counter this, subsidies were granted to serving soldiers in an attempt to lower the desertion rate of soldiers serving in the family and help maintain a connection between the serving soldier's immediate family with their ancestral one. The subsidy gave a reason for the immediate family members of the soldier to regularly visit their ancestral homes to collect payment and thereby maintain their relationship.

However certain regions were known to have differing views of military service, such as Yiwu County where Qi Jiguang recruited his troops. Young men with varying backgrounds ranging from peasants to that of a national university student in those areas chose to join the army. A major reason for the popularity of military service in this area was the potential for quick advancement through military success.

=== Navy ===
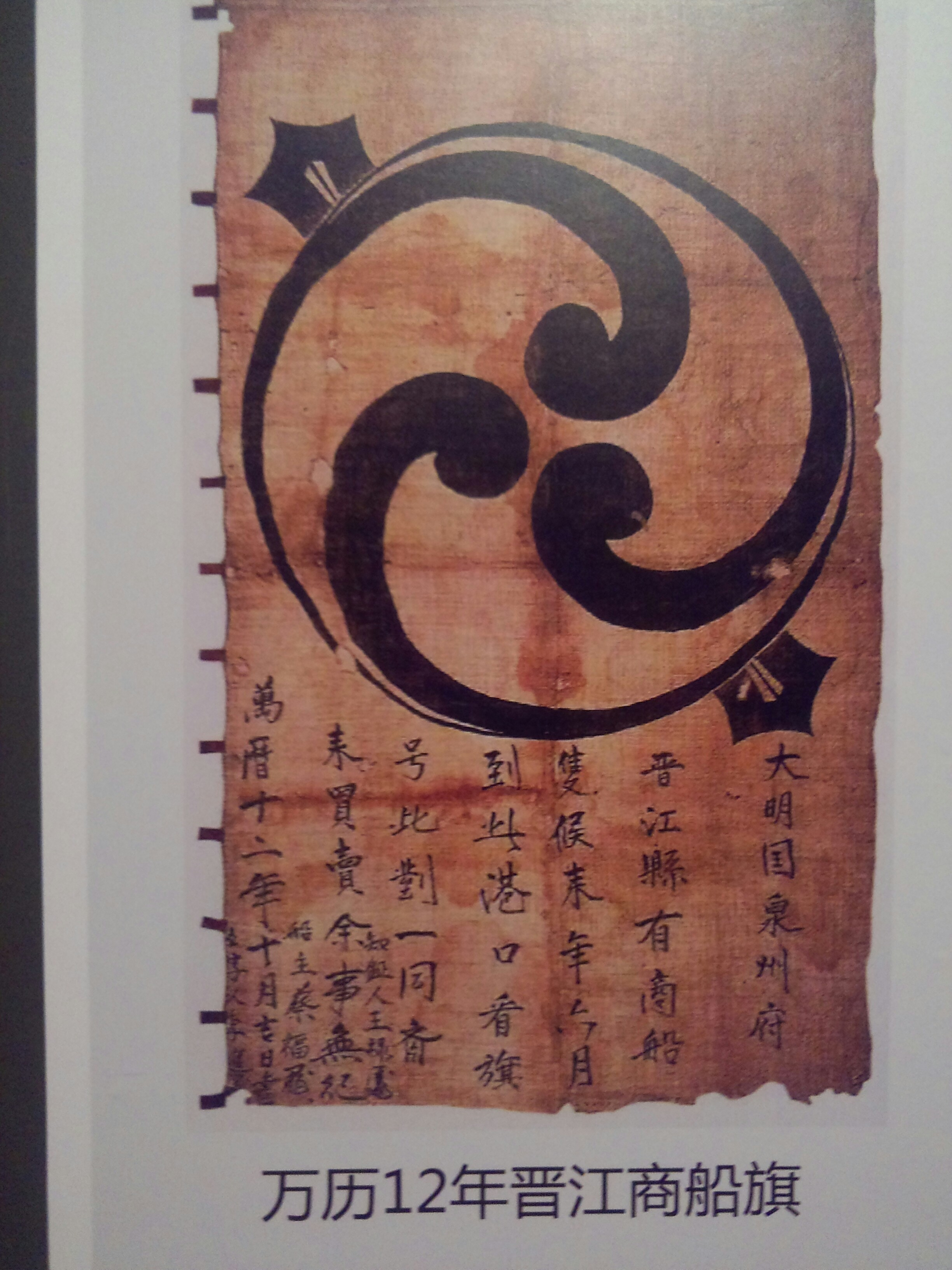
The banner of a merchant ship from Quanzhou, Ming dynasty, 1584

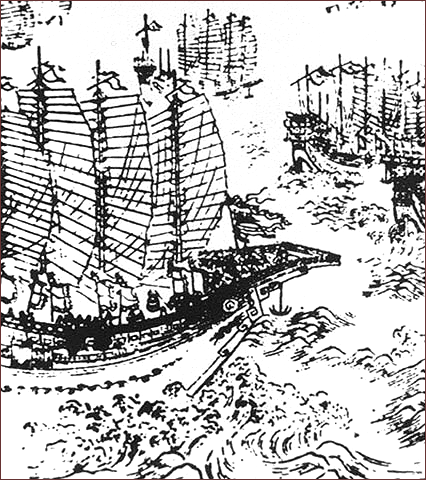
Woodblock print of the Treasure Fleet

The navy was not a separate entity during the Ming era and was part of the guard battalion system. Every coastal guard battalion was allotted 50 ships for maritime defense. The Ming also set up naval palisades, beacon towers, strategic forts, and irregular military units and warships.

Ming naval activity was noticeably subdued. Its founder, the Hongwu Emperor, emphasized that "not even a plank is to be allowed into the sea." He did however establish the Longjiang Shipyards of Nanjing that would grow into the birthplace of the Treasure Fleet. The Ming Navy was also equipped with firearms, making them one of the earliest gunpowder armed navies at the time. It was therefore described by Lo and Elleman as the world's "foremost" navy of that era.

The Hongwu Emperor ordered the formation of 56 military stations (wei), each with a strength of 50 warships and 5000 seamen. However most of these seem to have been left under-strength. The size of the navy was greatly expanded by the Yongle Emperor. The Ming Navy was divided into the Imperial fleet stationed in Nanjing, two coastal defence squadrons, the high-seas fleet used by Zheng He, and the grain transportation fleet. The Chinese treasure fleet was able to dominate other Asian navies, which enabled the Ming to send governors to rule in Luzon and Palembang as well as depose and enthrone puppet rulers in Sri Lanka and the Bataks.

After the period of maritime activity during the treasure voyages under the Yongle Emperor, the official policy towards naval expansion swayed between active restriction to ambivalence. Despite Ming ambivalence towards naval affairs, in 1521, at the Battle of Tunmen a squadron of Ming naval junks defeated a Portuguese caravel fleet, which was followed by another Ming victory against a Portuguese fleet at the Battle of Xicaowan in 1522. Coastal defensive measures, however, proved largely inadequate against pirate raids, and conditions continued to deteriorate until the Jiajing wokou raids were ended by Qi Jiguang and Yu Dayou. In 1633, a Ming navy defeated a Dutch and Chinese pirate fleet during the Battle of Liaoluo Bay. A large number of military treatises, including extensive discussions of naval warfare, were written during the Ming period, including the Wubei Zhi and Jixiao Xinshu. Additionally, shipwrecks have been excavated in the South China Sea, including wrecks of Chinese trade and war ships that sank around 1377 and 1645.

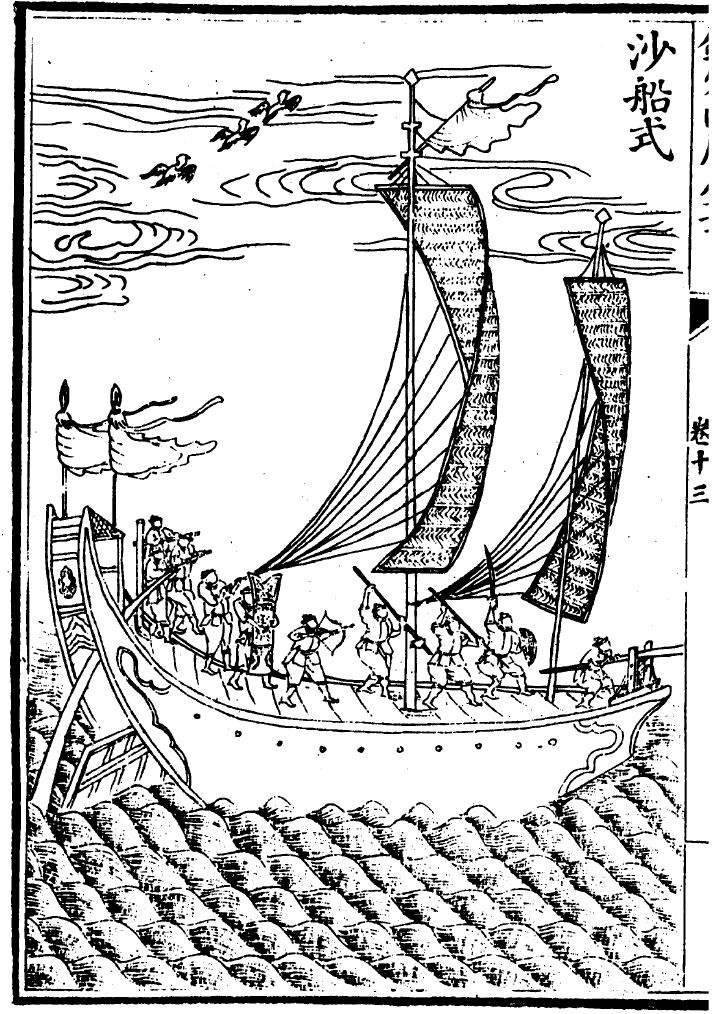
Sand ship, from the Chouhai Tubian, 1562

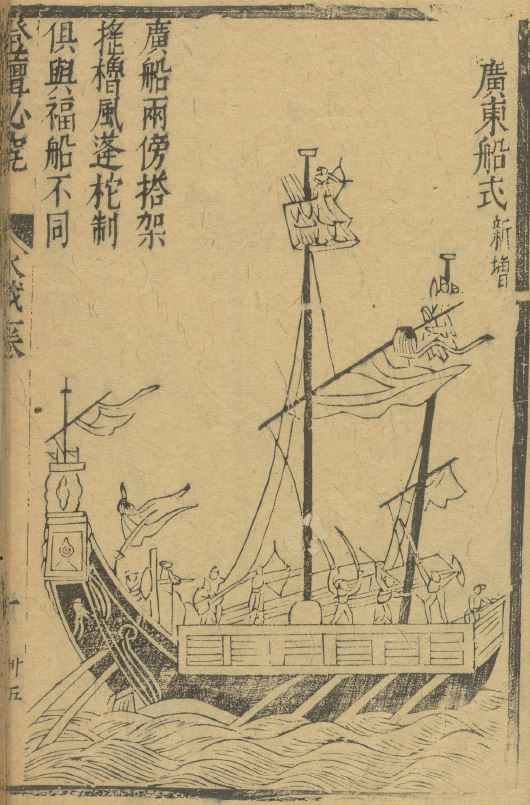
Guangdong ship, from the Dengtan Bijiu, 1599

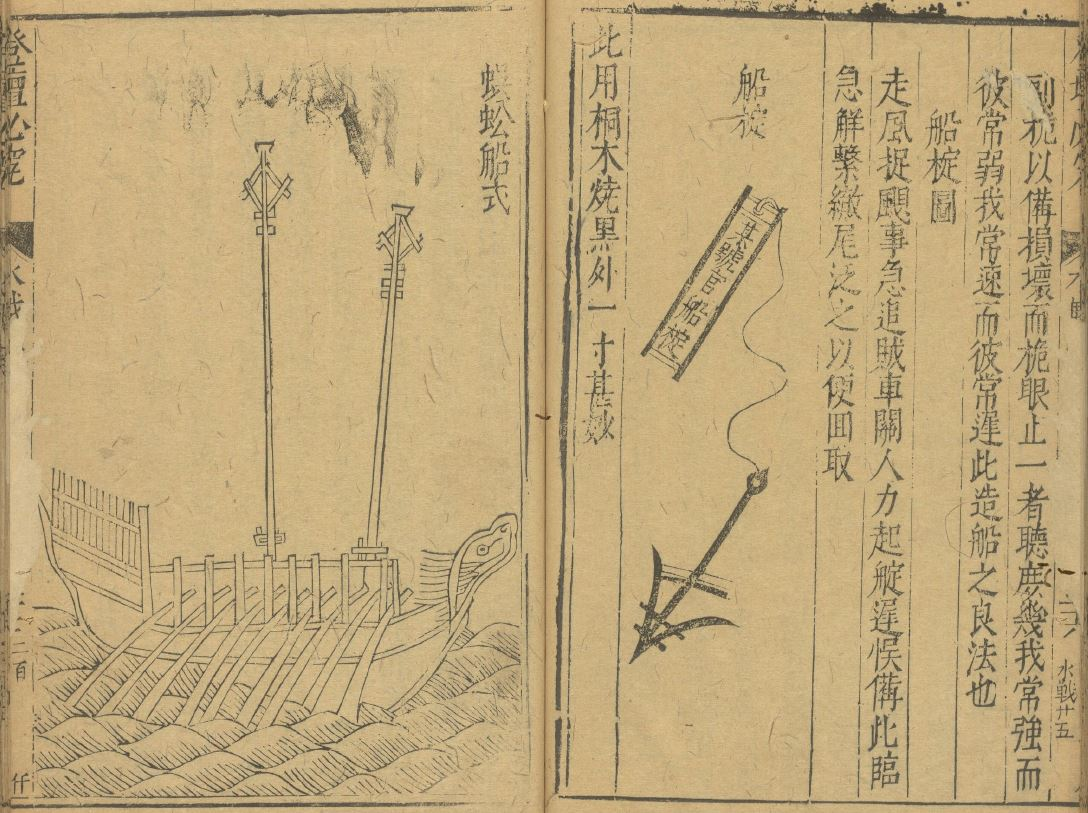
A centipede ship and anchor, from the Dengtan Bijiu

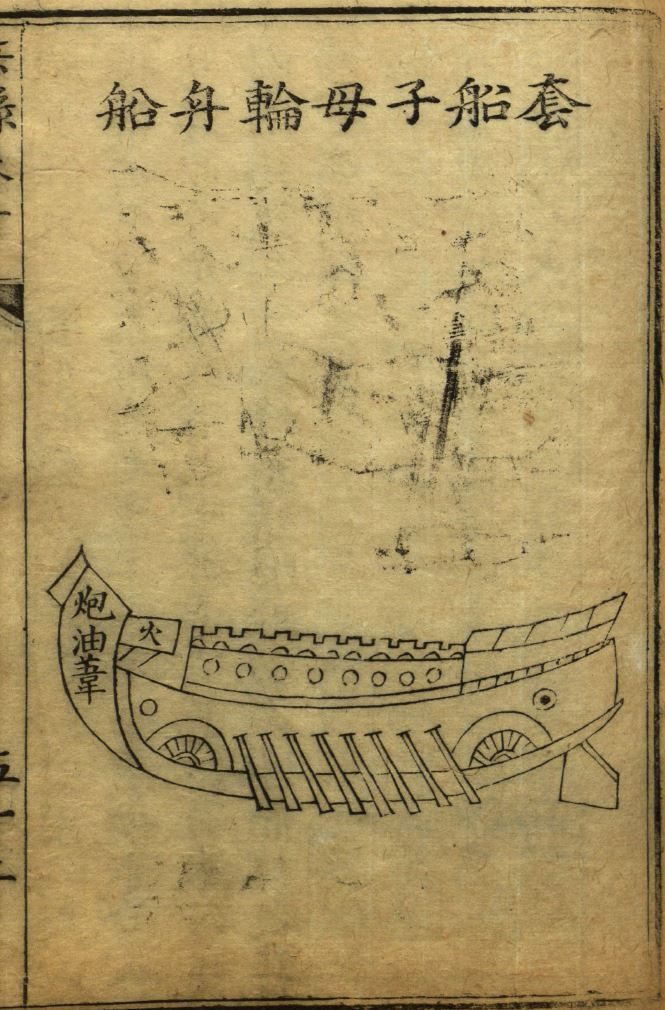
Covered son and mother wheel boat, from the Binglu, 1606

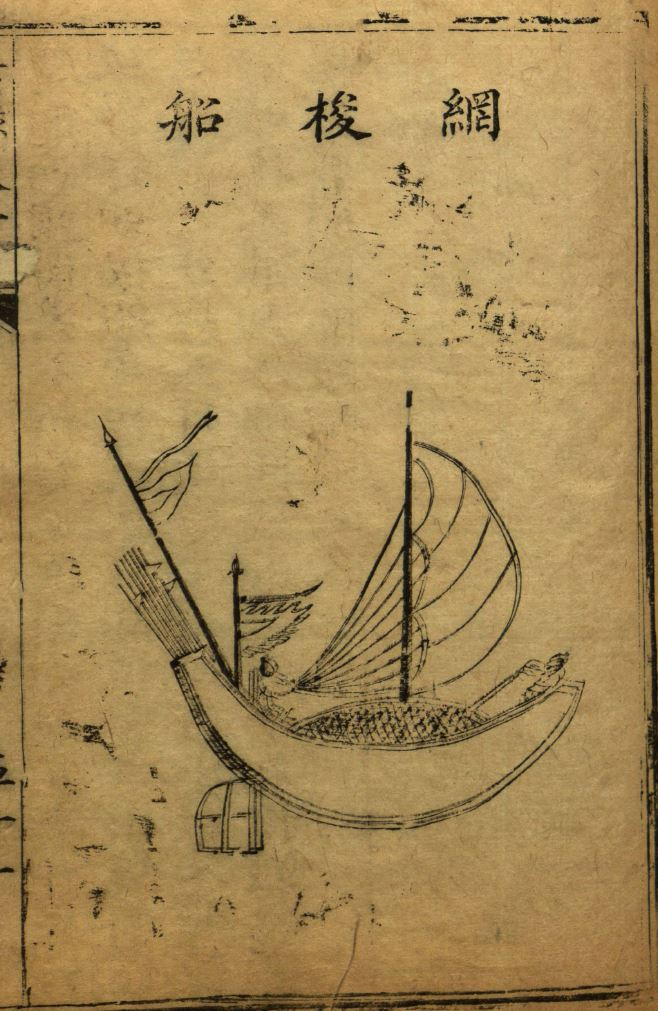
Netting ship, from the Binglu

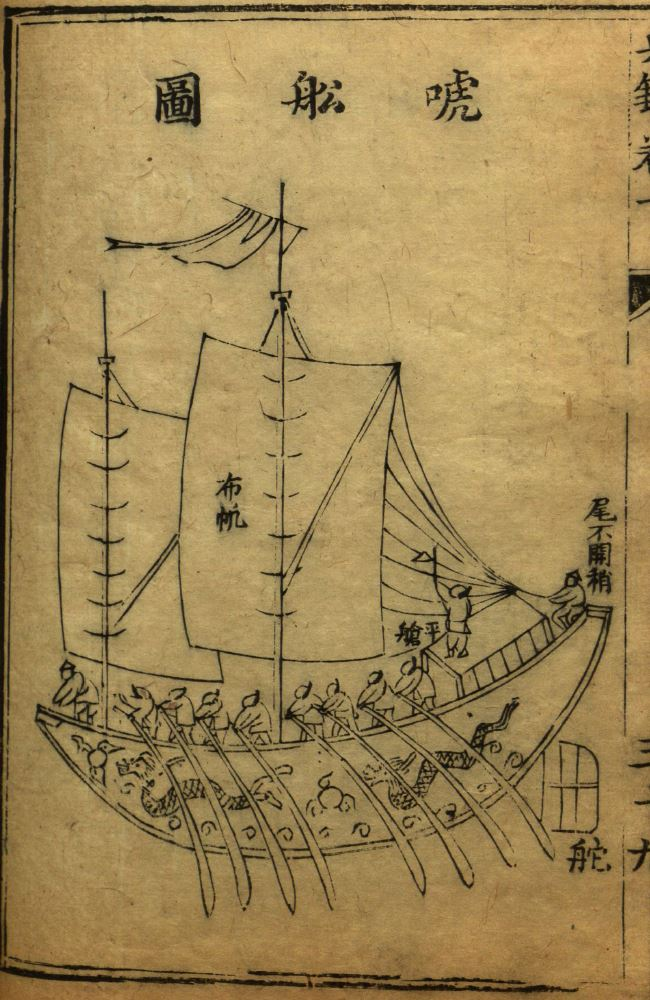
Tiger roar ship, from the Binglu

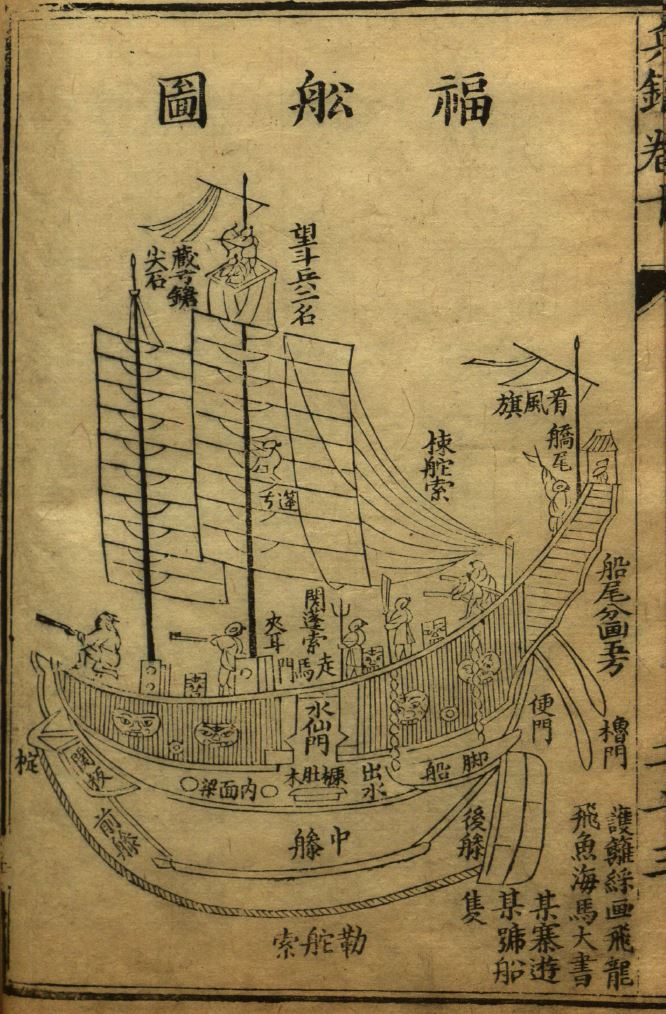
Fuzhou ship, from the Binglu

== Other military institutions ==
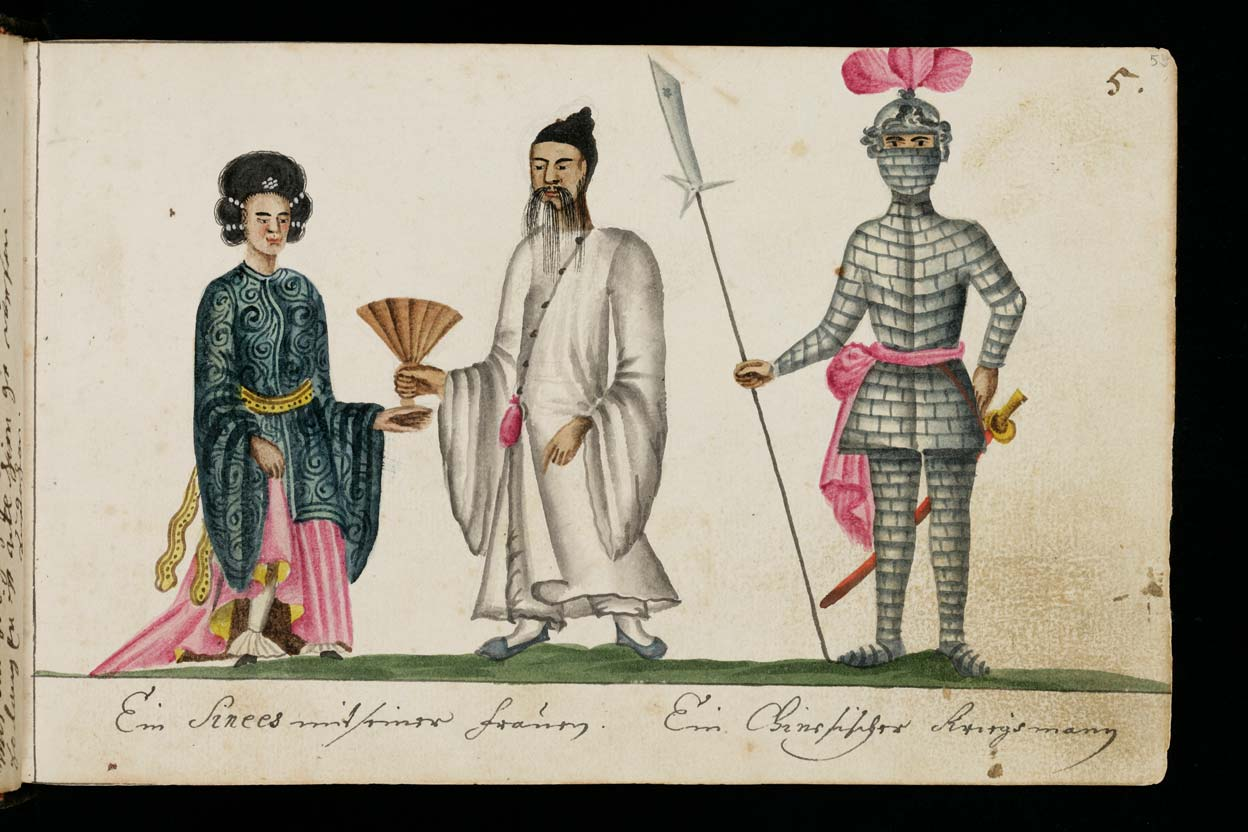
Dutch depiction of a Chinese soldier, man, and woman, from Reise nach Batavia (Georg Franz Müller), 17th c.

=== Princes ===
Princes of the Imperial family were also granted substantial military authority in strategic points around the empire. Each was granted an estate with the power to recruit military officers for their personal staff (this was restricted in 1395) and held total judicial authority over them. This ancient system, intended to provide military experience before deployment, had not been used in China for a thousand years. Princes were also dispatched to join campaigns with their personal bodyguards. Zhu Di, Prince of Yan, impressed the Hongwu Emperor with his command of the 1390 campaign against the Mongols under Nayir Bukha and was allowed to retain command of the 10,000 Mongol soldiers he had captured. This later aided the prince in his usurpation of the throne. In some cases the princes were appointed to fill vacant command positions. Zhu Gang, the Prince of Qin, was sent to build military colonies (tuntian) beyond the Great Wall. Princes were granted an escort guard (huwei bing) under their personal control, while a court-appointed officer commanded the shouzhen bing or garrison force, over which the princes only had authority during emergencies declared by the Emperor. This dual chain of command was meant to prevent a coup d'état in the capital. The garrison force could only be deployed with an order carrying both the Emperor's and the Prince's seal. The Regional Military Commission armies were then used to check the princes' military power. Many princes amassed large bodyguard forces and transferred regular soldiers to their personal command without authorisation anyway, using them on campaign. The authority of princes was curtailed by the Jianwen Emperor. When the Yongle Emperor came to power, he further purged his brothers on trumped up charges and abolished most of the princely guards; by the dynasty's end there were less than a dozen extant. He also established a hereditary military nobility from his top generals during his usurpation, both Han Chinese and Mongol. They were however denied long-term commands so as to prevent personal power bases from forming.

=== Mercenaries and salaried soldiers ===
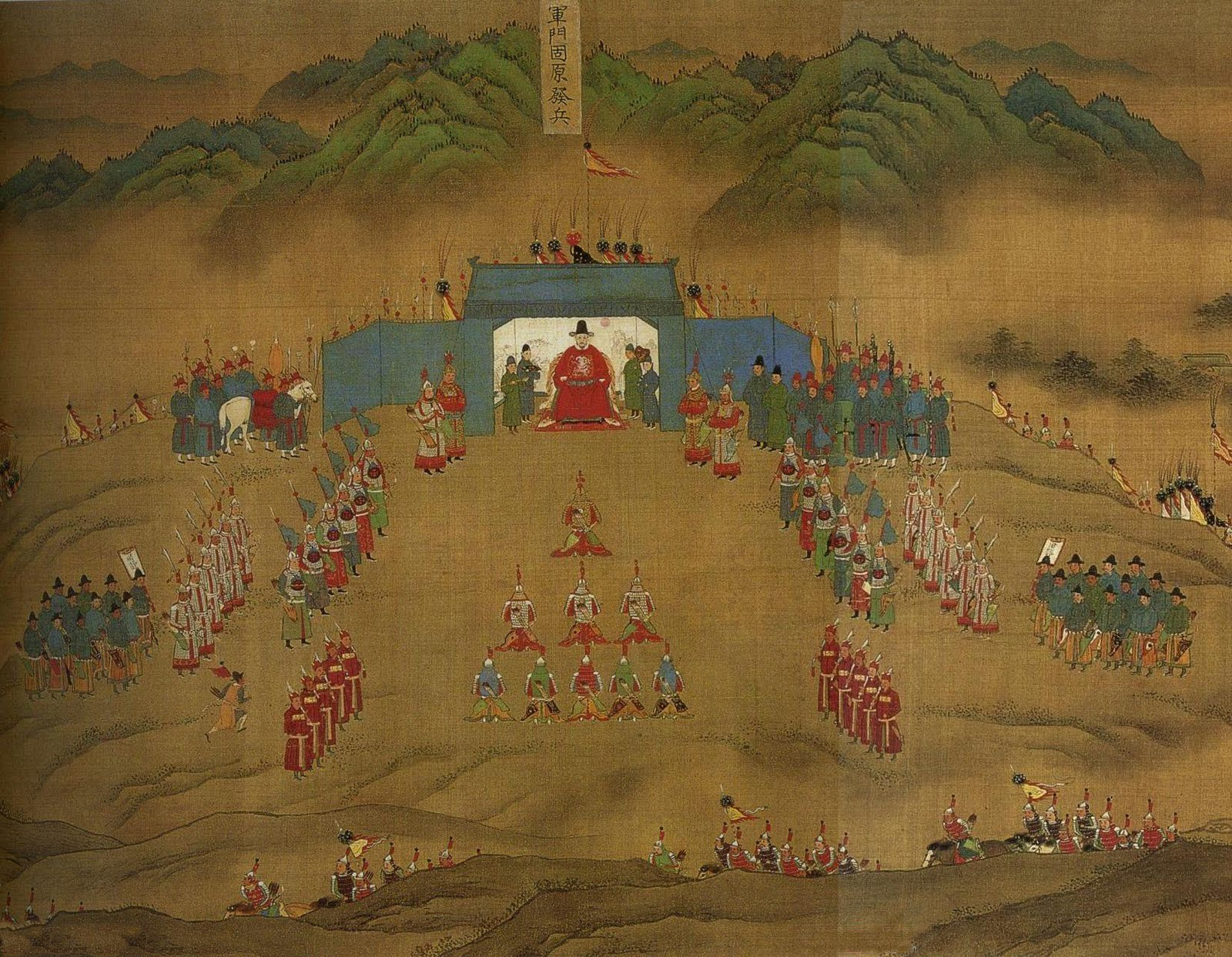
Ming generals attending camp

After the decline of the guard battalion system, the Ming army came to rely more upon mercenaries to improve efficiency and lighten local military burdens.

Hired soldiers helped bolster the ranks of the army by allowing armies to have more members, aside from the active members of the military households. These soldiers came from multiple sources; some came from inactive members of military households, the ones that were not registered as the serving soldier of the family, as well as other members of the empire that were not obligated to serve in the army. Non-hereditary troops were a fairly distinct and unified group within the army as they would rebel and riot together whenever they had problems with how they were treated or whenever their salaries were not paid on time.

As the social status of soldiers was not high, mercenaries usually came from the desperate underclass of society such as amnestied bandits or vagabonds. The quality of these troops was highly diverse, depending on their regional origins. Peasant militia were generally regarded as more reliable than full-time soldiers, who were described as useless. Commanders refrained from training or reforming the mercenary armies for fear of provoking riots, and Ming generals started to fight personally on the front lines with handpicked battalions of elite bodyguards rather than attempt to control the hordes of unreliable mercenaries.

By the 1570s, the Ming army had largely transitioned to a mercenary force.

==== Housemen ====
Housemen were soldiers who privately served the higher-ups in the army. The addition of housemen in the army challenged core ideals within the army as housemen emphasized the concept of self-interest as opposed to the previous concept of loyalty to the empire. Housemen were mercenaries hired by commanders at competitive wages to serve as private retainers. Although they were more expensive for the treasury, they displayed greater military ability. The housemen often formed sworn or adoptive kinship ties with their commanders to show their special bonding. However, they were often criticized as greedy or more loyal to their commanders than the dynasty.

== Origins of soldiers ==
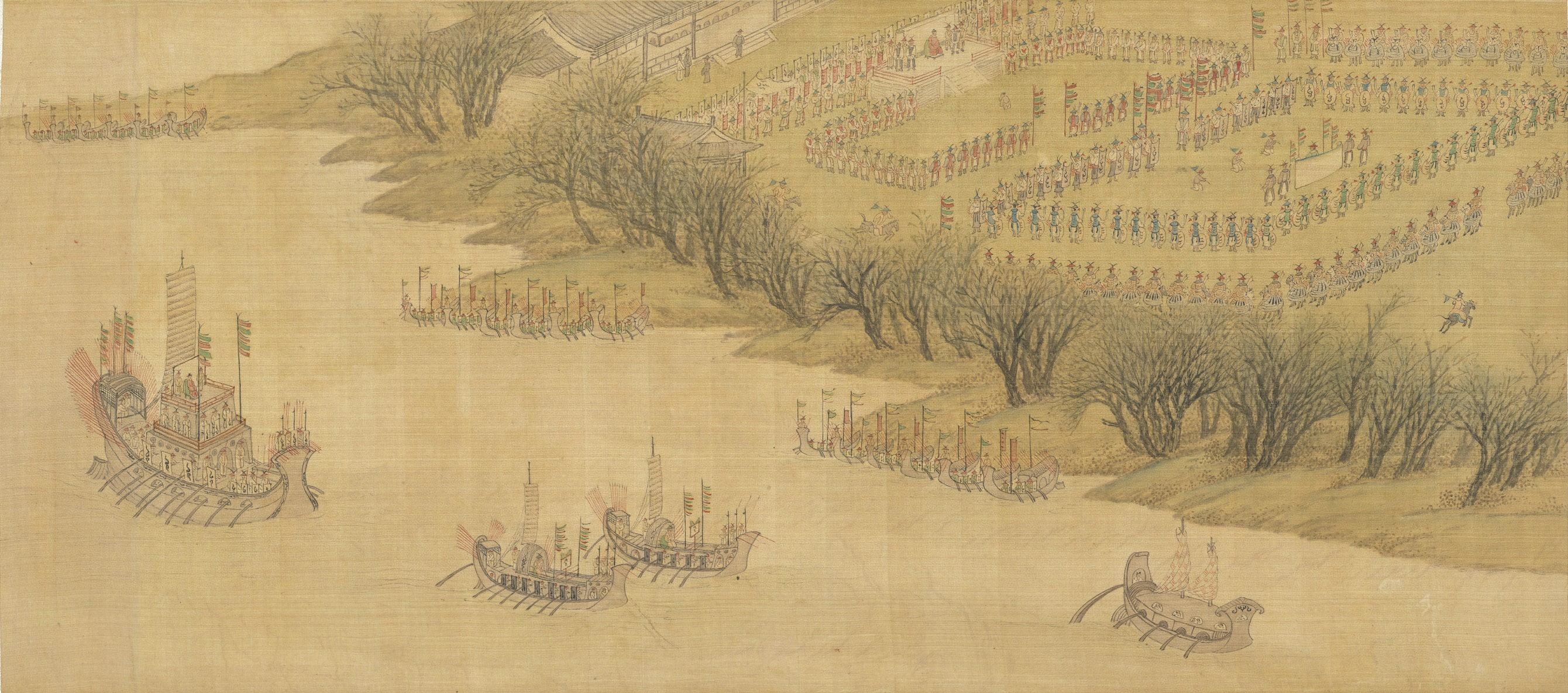
Ming soldiers and river ships

=== Mongol and other steppe troops ===
The Hongwu Emperor incorporated northern peoples such as the Mongols and Jurchens into the army. Mongols were retained by the Ming within its territory. Most of these soldiers were stationed on the northern frontier, however they were deployed in the south as well in some cases such as in Guangxi against Miao rebellions.

The Ming dynasty had a high proportion of Mongols serving in important military positions, and they were highly successful at granting titles to attract Mongols to defect to the Ming. In the fourteenth and fifteenth centuries Mongol officers in the Ming army were given preferential tax exemptions, housing, wages and title benefits. The Mongols were able to obtain government rewards such as land grants and opportunities to rise up in the military, but they suffered general discrimination as an ethnic minority. Mongol soldiers and leaders were never given independent control and always answered to a Chinese general, however the Chinese supervisory role was mostly a nominal one, so Mongol troops behaved as though they were independent mercenaries or personal retinues. This relationship lasted throughout the entire dynasty, and even in the late Ming, general retinues included Mongol horsemen in their company.

Large numbers of Mongols bordering the Ming in Gansu and other frontiers were designated as garrisons. Their leaders were issued with officer titles, seals, letters patent, granting them access to the lucrative border trade and increasing their local legitimacy. Particularly important to Ming strategic objectives was the "Seven Garrisons west of Jiayu Pass": Shazhou, Chigil, Anding, Aduan, Quxian, Handong, and Hami, which were local houses which had held titles from the former Yuan court. The Ming needed to counter the influence of the Northern Yuan in the frontier: from 1400 to 1430 the Ming court also pursued a much more active policy of attracting Mongols to submit, and there was a large influx of Mongols into Gansu, where they were resettled into Ningxia, Yongchang and Liangzhou. After this period, Mongols would settle in Beijing directly.

Ming dynasty writer and historian Zhu Guozhen (1558-1632) remarked on how the Ming dynasty managed to successfully control Mongols who surrendered to the Ming and were relocated and deported into China to serve in military matters unlike the Eastern Han dynasty and Western Jin dynasty whose unsuccessfully management of the surrendered and defeated barbarians of the Five Barbarians they imported into northern China who became educated and this led to rebellion in the Uprising of the Five Barbarians.

=== Japanese troops ===
During the Bozhou rebellion, the Ming army tasked with suppressing the rebels also incorporated Japanese units that had surrendered during the Japanese invasions of Korea.

=== Wolf troops ===
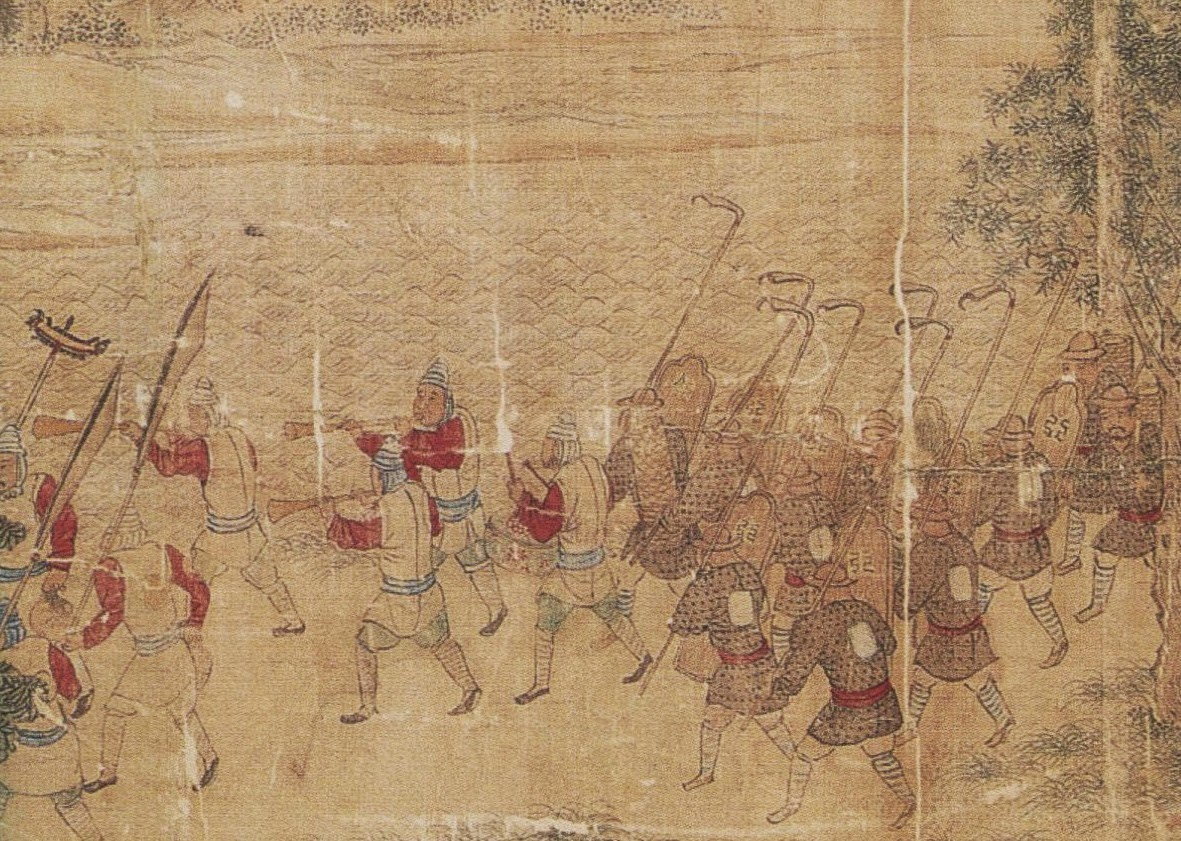
Depiction of wolf warriors from the painting, Kang wo tu juan

The Ming dynasty sometimes employed "martial minorities" such as the "wolf troops" of Guangxi as shock infantry.

Lang troops are also Yao and Zhuang people. The Yao and Zhuang become bandits, but the lang troops dare not on the threat of death become bandits, not because the lang troops are obedient and the Yao and Zhuang are rebellious. The difference arises from the force of circumstances. The land of the lang troops is held under native officials; the land of the Yao and Zhuang is held under transferable officials. Native officials maintain strict discipline, and this is sufficient to keep the lang troops under control. Transferable officials do not maintain strict discipline and are incapable of restraining the Yao and Zhuang. There are no measures better than assigning Yao and Zhuang land to nearby native officials, in order to achieve what since ancient times has been known as the policy of using the barbarians against the barbarians. This would turn all Yao and Zhuang into lang troops. It might be thought that as the land holdings of the native officials expand, they would. . . . However, the native officials are already extremely wealthy, and to maintain this good fortune that has come as if from heaven, they would not look elsewhere. Moreover, they love their own hideouts and do not easily rebel. Even if they do rebel, it is as easy to put them down as it is to have one’s tooth extracted. The native official can command his men only because he has the force of the country on his side. This is enough to keep the native officials under control, and to use the native official’s force against the Yao and Zhuang.

— Shen Xiyi

Ming loyalist Ma Shiying had brought to Nanjing troops from the western provinces made out of non-Han indigenous fierce tribal warriors who were called "Sichuan" soldiers to defend the city against the Qing. These Ming loyalist non-Han "barbarian" fierce tribal warriors were slaughtered by the Han Chinese citizens of Nanjing after the Han Chinese people of Nanjing had peacefully defected and turned the city to Qing rule when the Southern Ming Hongguang emperor left the city. The Dutch East India company secretary Johann Nieuhof observed that Nanjing city and its people were unharmed by the Qing and only the Ming palace suffered destruction. The damage inflicted to the Ming palace was largely done by the Han Chinese locals of Nanjing, and not the Qing army.

=== Northern soldiers ===
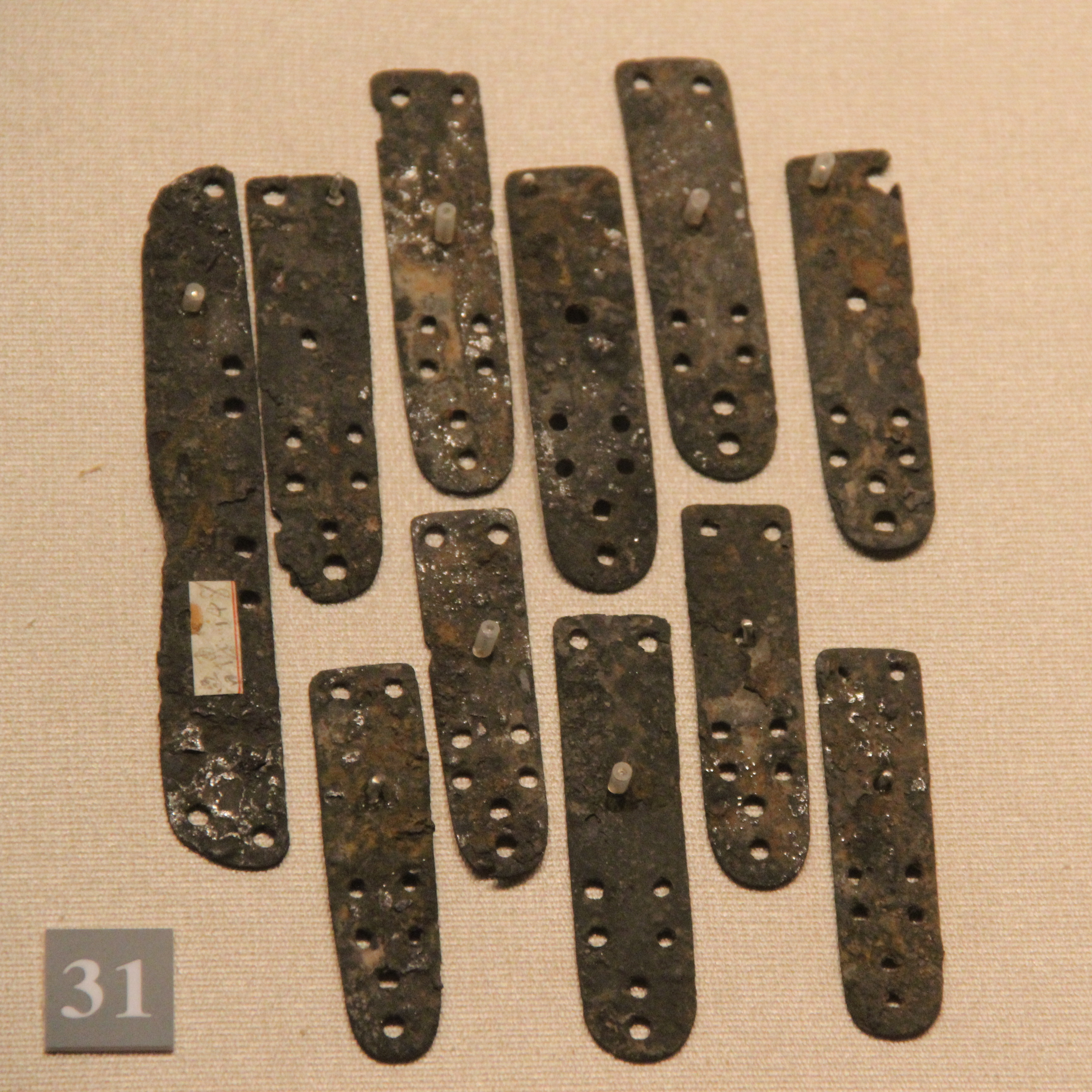
Ming lamallae armour pieces

Qi Jiguang described northern soldiers as stupid and impatient. When he tried to introduce muskets in the north, the soldiers there were adamant in continuing to use fire lances.

Recruits from Liaodong, and people from Liaodong in general, were considered untrustworthy, unruly, and little better than thugs. In Liaodong as military service and command became hereditary, vassalage-like personal bonds of loyalty grew between officers, their subordinates and troops. This military caste gravitated toward the Jurchen tribal chieftains rather than the bureaucrats of the capital.

=== Southern soldiers ===
Troops of Southern Chinese extract seem to have fared better in infantry and naval combat than those in the north. They have at least on one occasion been called "ocean imps" by Northern Chinese. Southerners were also intensely mistrusted by Northern Chinese. During the Wuqiao Mutiny of 1633, the northern Chinese rebels purged the "southerners" in their midst, who were suspected of aiding the Ming.

There was a lingua franca used among troops known as junjiahua, or "military speech", based on Northern Chinese dialects. It can be found into the present day throughout southern China, having been passed down by descendants of Ming dynasty soldiers.

Ming troops heading out to confront the wokou pirates, from the scroll Wo Kou tu juan

== Weapons ==
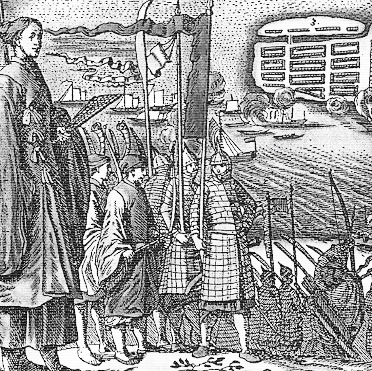
Late Southern Ming soldiers

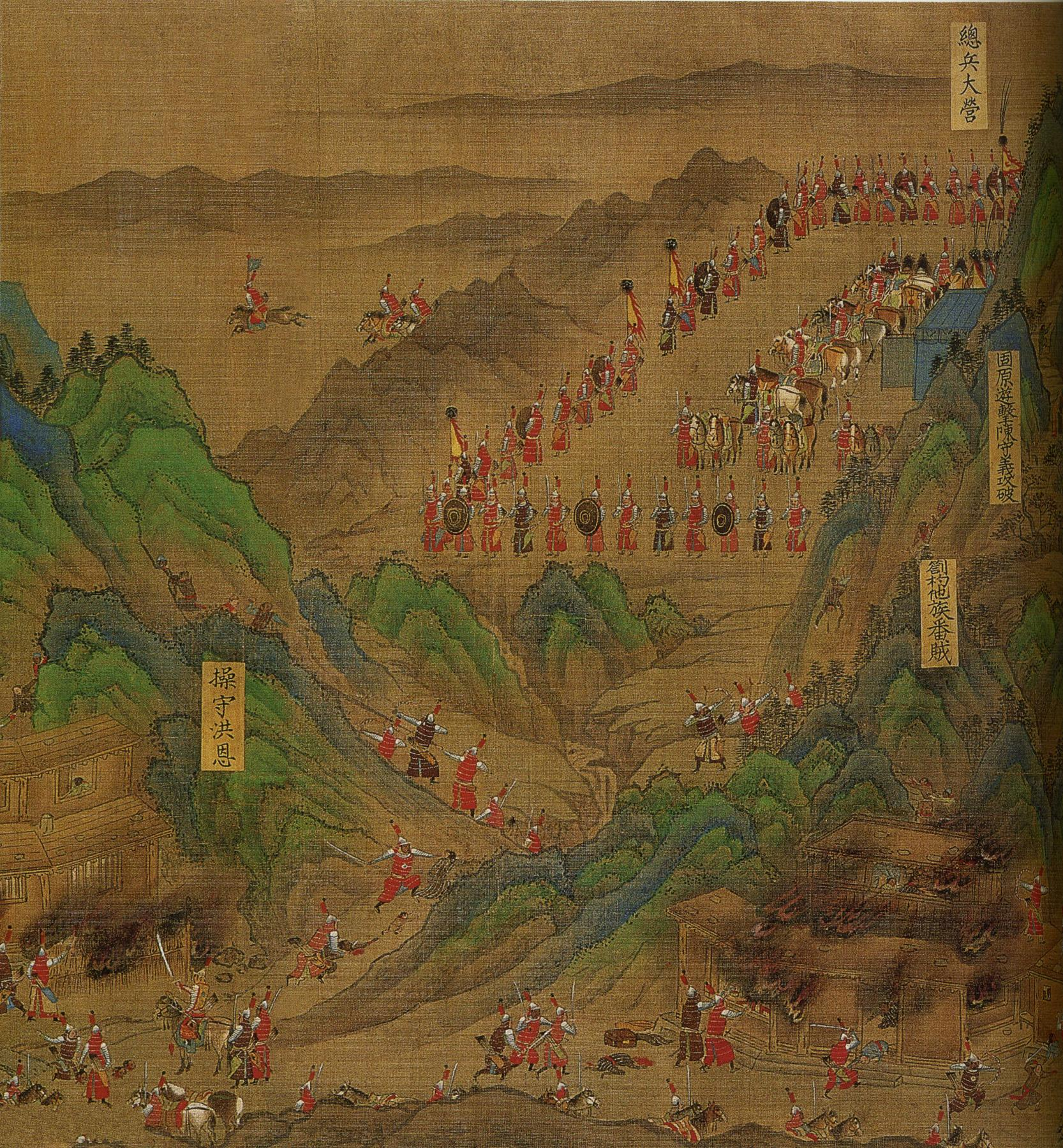
Ming soldiers with shields guarding camp

The spear was the most common weapon and soldiers were given comprehensive training in spear combat, both as individuals and in formation. A complete spear regimen lasted one hundred days.

The dao, also called a saber, is a Chinese category for single edged, curved swords. It was the basic close fighting weapon of the Ming dynasty. The jian, also known as a long sword, is a Chinese category for straight double-edged swords. It experienced a resurgence during the Yuan dynasty but fell out of favor again in the Ming. The jian remained in use by a small number of arms specialists but was otherwise known for its qualities as a marker of scholarly refinement.

The "Horse Beheading Dao" was described in Ming sources as a 96 cm blade attached to a 128 cm shaft, essentially a glaive weapon. It's speculated that the Swede Frederick Coyett was talking about this weapon when he described Zheng Chenggong's troops wielding "with both hands a formidable battle-sword fixed to a stick half the length of a man".

Qi Jiguang deployed his soldiers in a 12-man 'mandarin duck' formation, which consisted of four pikemen, two men carrying daos with a great and small shield, two 'wolf brush' wielders, a rearguard officer, and a porter. This system bears some resemblance to European systems (pike and shot) developing in England where formations of arquebusiers would be protected by a group of pikemen. Volley fire was also used.

Archery with bow and crossbow was considered a central skill despite the rise of gunpowder weapons.

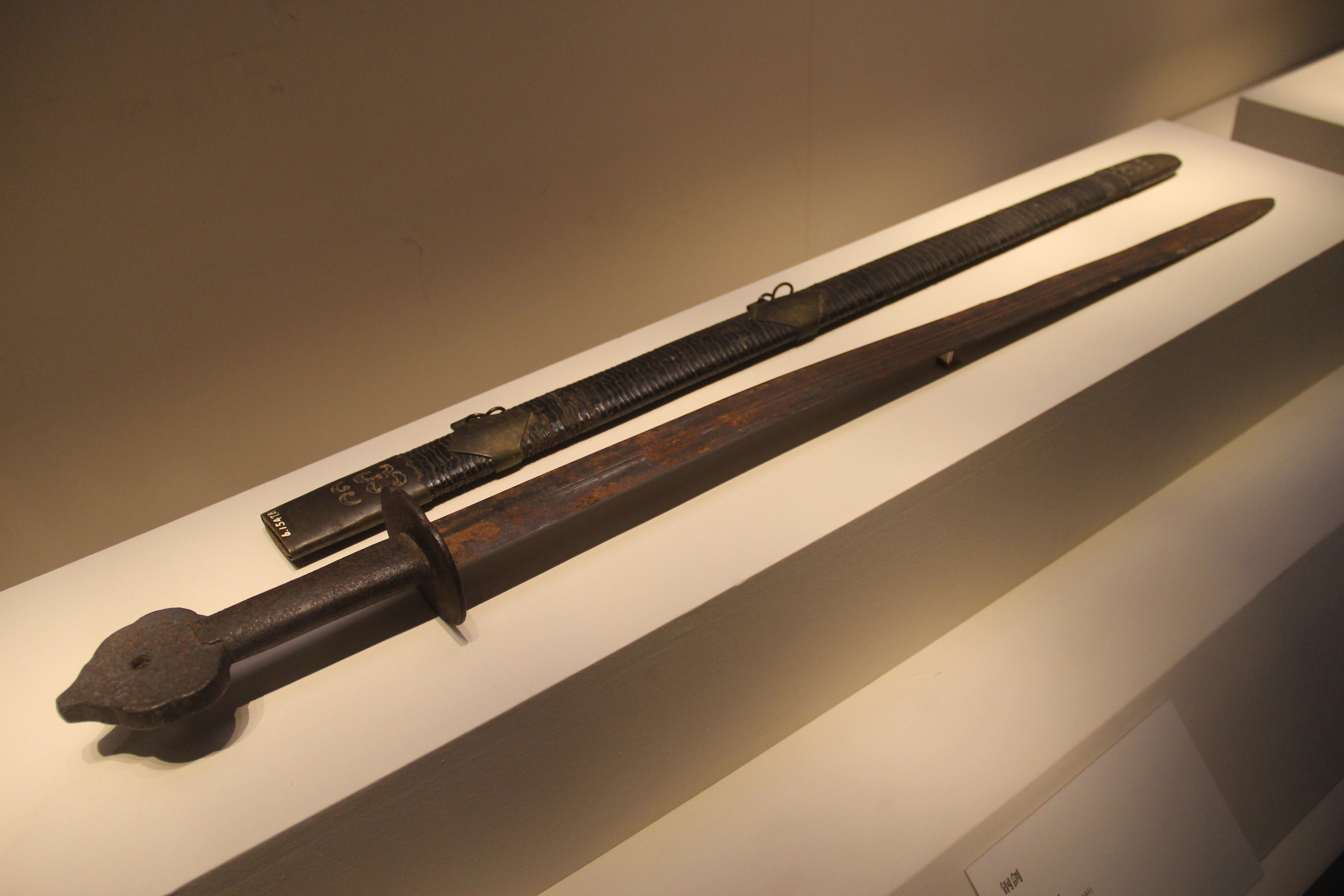
Ming steel jian

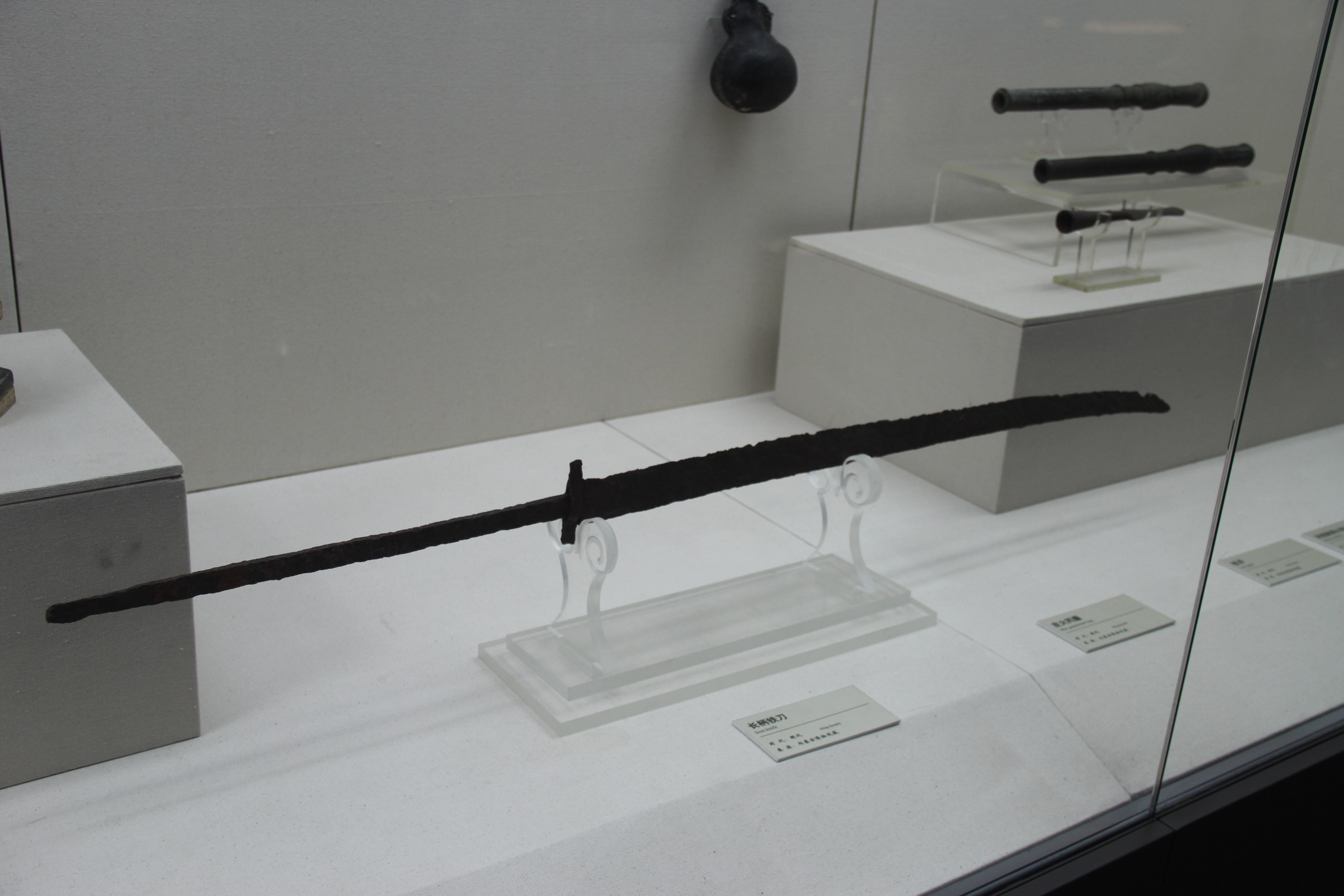
Ming dao

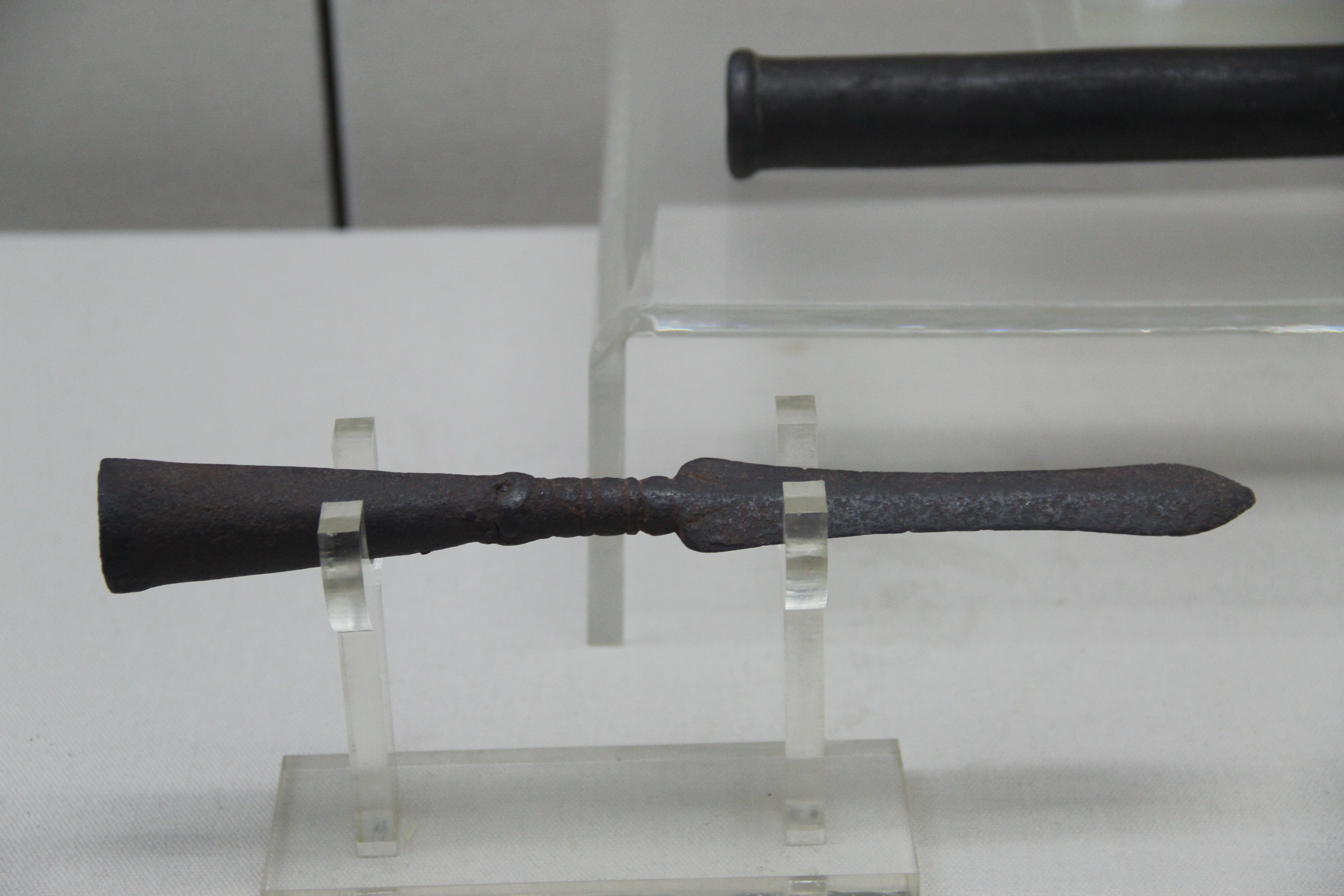
Ming spearhead

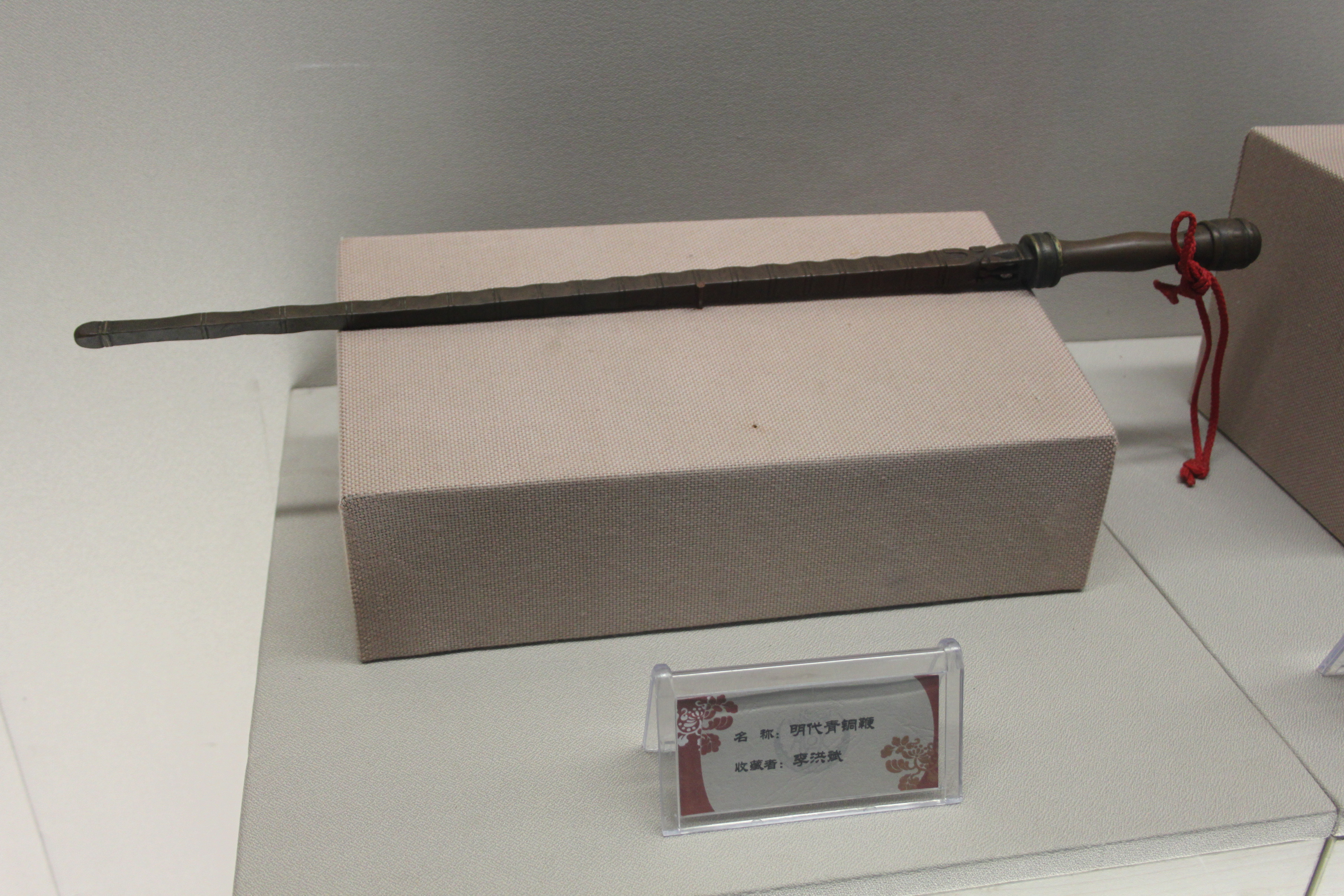
Ming iron truncheon

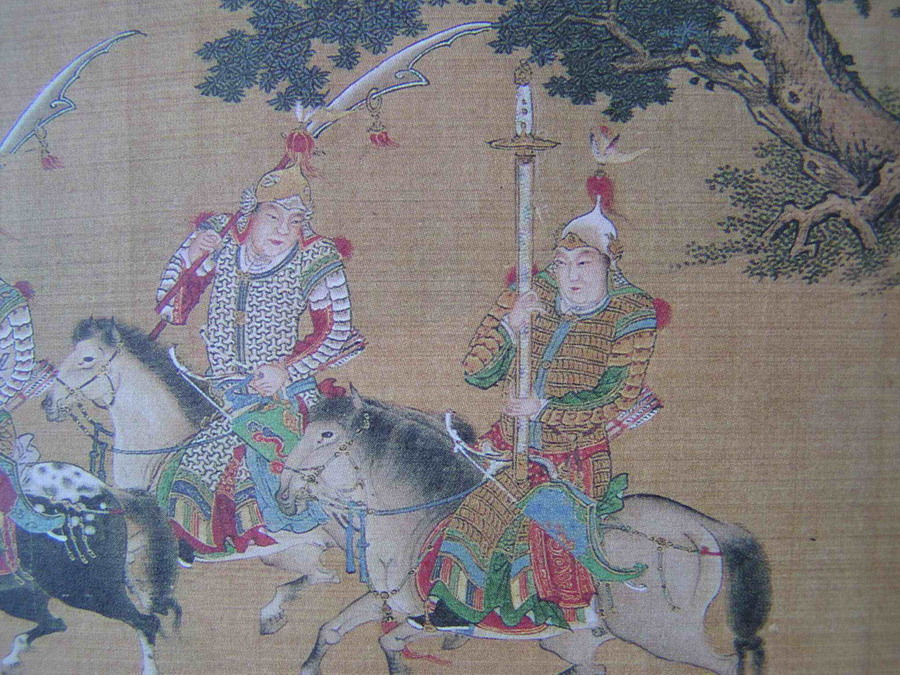
Ming soldiers carrying a dao and jian

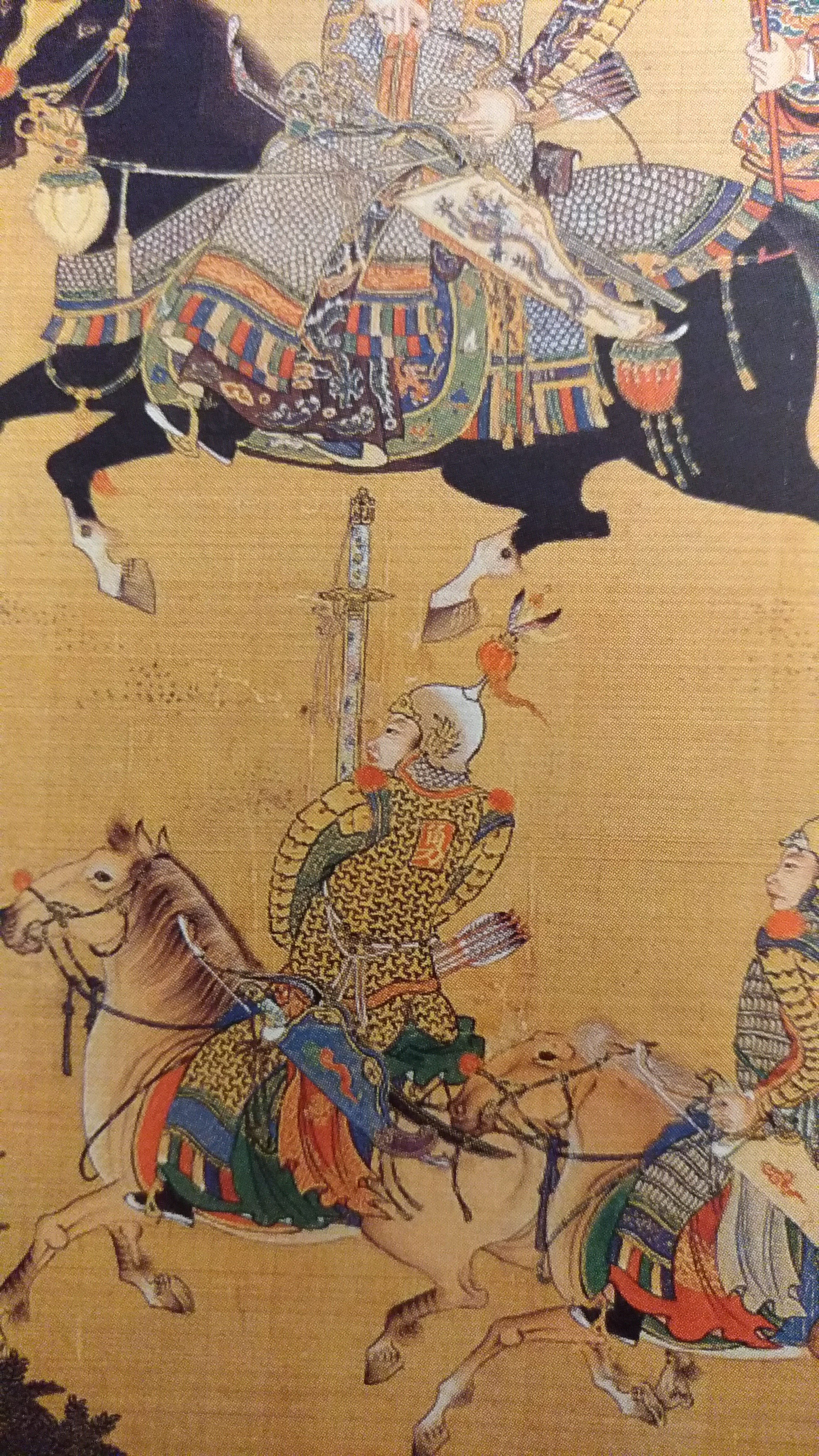
Ming soldier carrying a jian

== Armour ==
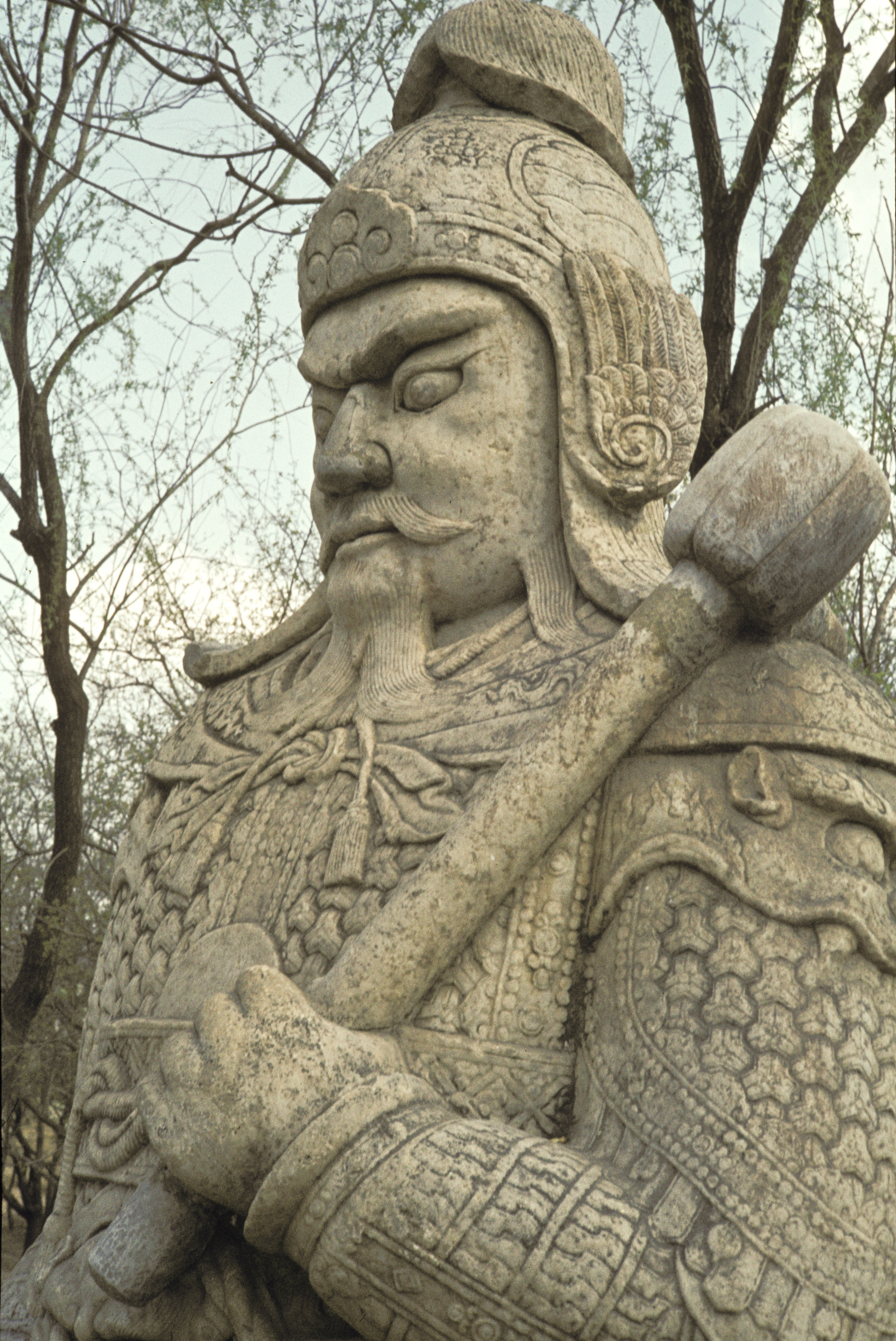
Tomb guardian in mountain pattern armour, Ming dynasty

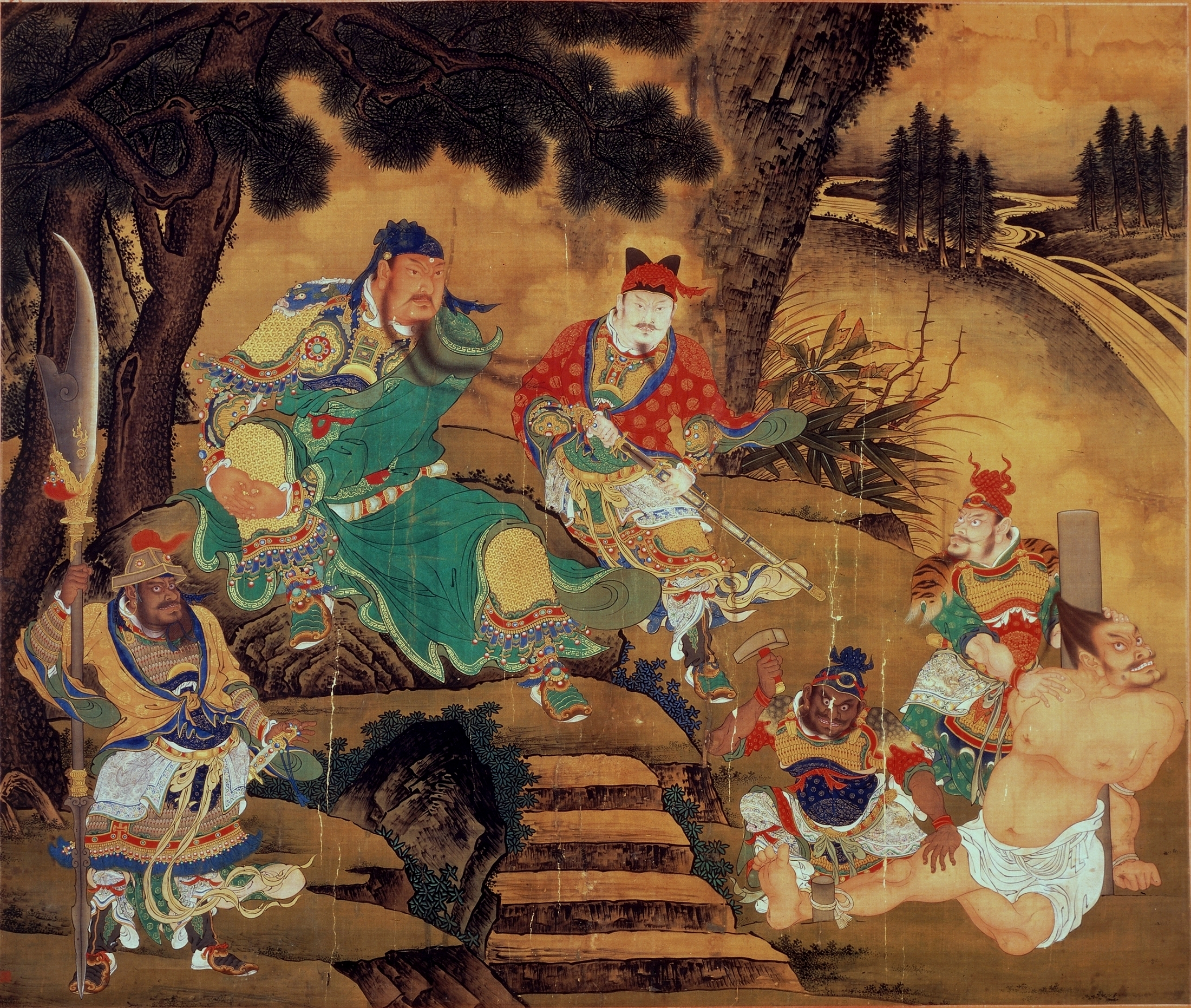
Guan Yu in mountain pattern armour

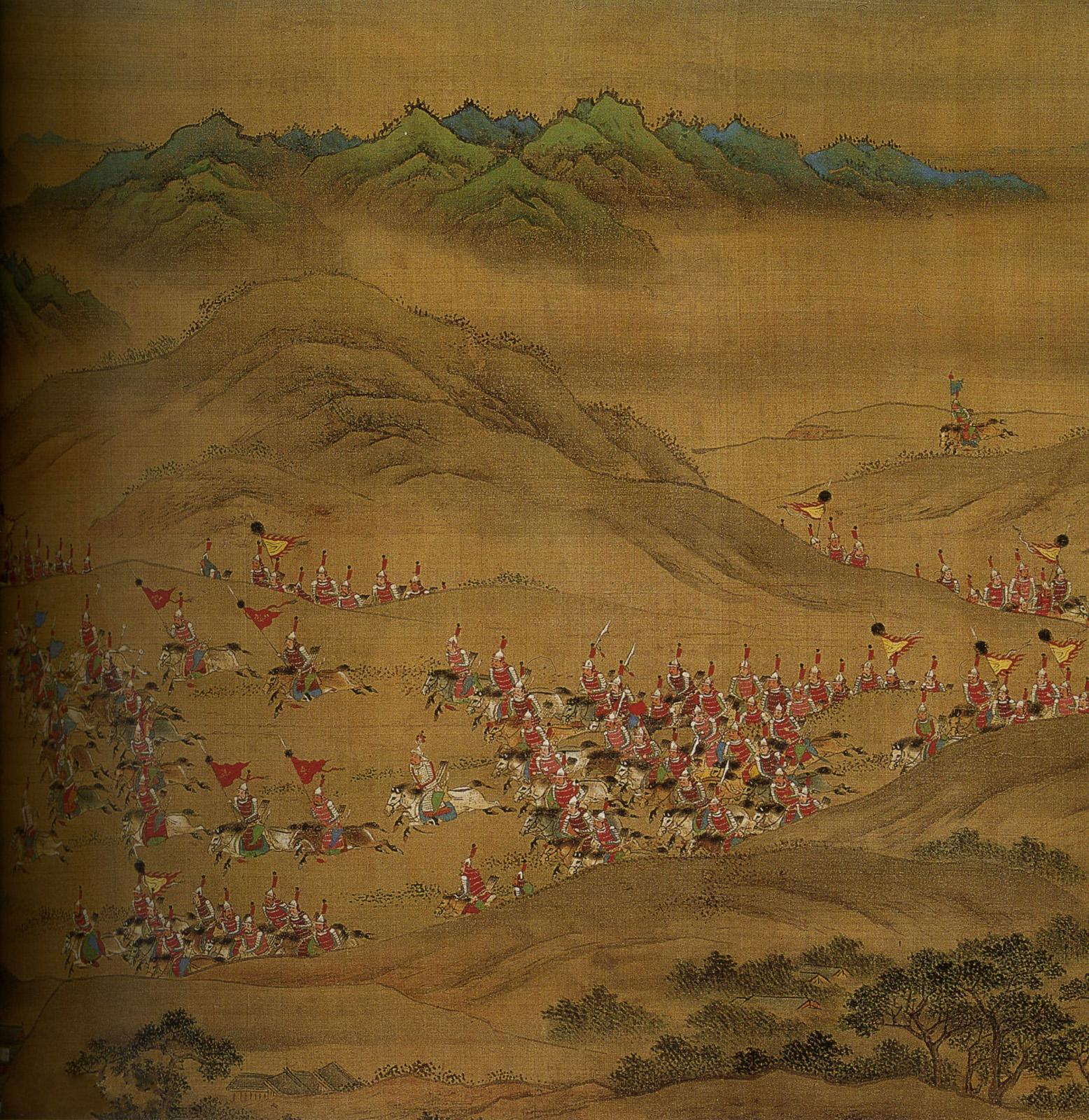
Ming cavalrymen wearing a combination of brigandine and lamellar armour

As C.J Peers argues, during the Ming dynasty, judging from illustrations, most infantrymen did not wear armour, although it sometimes may have been hidden under robes. Armour is clearly depicted for officers and a small portion of the several hundred thousand strong army. However, contemporary records such as Si Zhen San Guan Zhi ("四镇三关志") written by Liu Xiaozu during the reign of Emperor Wanli details most soldiery having access to armour and some camps held another large number in storage, as the development of military industry saw rapid growth during the Ming dynasty as well as the need for greater defence especially around the northern borders.

Brigandine armour was used during the Ming era and consisted of riveted plates covered with fabric.

Partial plate armour in the form of a cuirass sewn together with fabric is mentioned in the Wubei Yaolue, 1638. It is not known how common plate armour was during the Ming dynasty, and no other source mentions it.

Although armour never lost all meaning during the Ming dynasty, it became less and less important as the power of firearms became apparent. It was already acknowledged by the early Ming artillery officer Jiao Yu that guns "were found to behave like flying dragons, able to penetrate layers of armor." Fully armoured soldiers could and were killed by guns. The Ming marshal Cai was one such victim. An account from the enemy side states, "Our troops used fire tubes to shoot and fell him, and the great army quickly lifted him and carried him back to his fortifications." It is possible that Chinese armour had some success in blocking musket balls later on during the Ming dynasty. According to the Japanese, during the Battle of Jiksan, the Chinese wore armour and used shields that were at least partially bulletproof. Frederick Coyett later described Ming lamellar armour as providing complete protection from "small arms", although this is sometimes mistranslated as "rifle bullets". English literature in the early 19th century also mentions Chinese rattan shields that were "almost musket proof", however another English source in the late 19th century states that they did nothing to protect their users during an advance on a Muslim stronghold, in which they were all invariably shot to death.

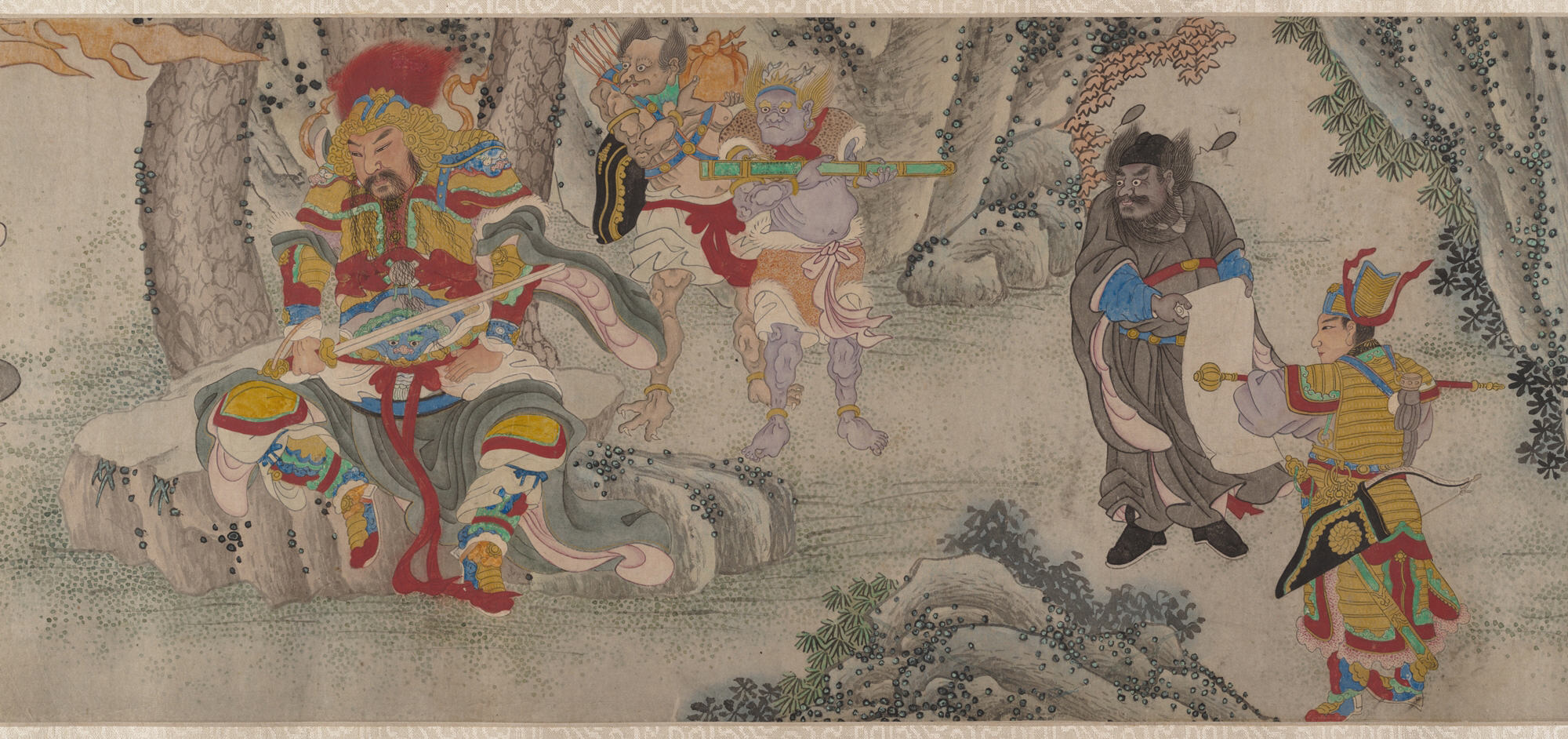
Warrior holding a mace wearing lamellar armour to the right, late Ming dynasty, 17th c.

Some were armed with bows and arrows hanging down their backs; others had nothing save a shield on the left arm and a good sword in the right hand; while many wielded with both hands a formidable battle-sword fixed to a stick half the length of a man. Everyone was protected over the upper part of the body with a coat of iron scales, fitting below one another like the slates of a roof; the arms and legs being left bare. This afforded complete protection from rifle bullets (mistranslation-should read "small arms") and yet left ample freedom to move, as those coats only reached down to the knees and were very flexible at all the joints. The archers formed Koxinga's best troops, and much depended on them, for even at a distance they contrived to handle their weapons with so great skill that they very nearly eclipsed the riflemen. The shield bearers were used instead of cavalry. Every tenth man of them is a leader, who takes charge of, and presses his men on, to force themselves into the ranks of the enemy. With bent heads and their bodies hidden behind the shields, they try to break through the opposing ranks with such fury and dauntless courage as if each one had still a spare body left at home. They continually press onwards, notwithstanding many are shot down; not stopping to consider, but ever rushing forward like mad dogs, not even looking round to see whether they are followed by their comrades or not. Those with the sword-sticks—called soapknives by the Hollanders—render the same service as our lancers in preventing all breaking through of the enemy, and in this way establishing perfect order in the ranks; but when the enemy has been thrown into disorder, the Sword-bearers follow this up with fearful massacre amongst the fugitives.

— Frederick Coyett

Rocket handlers often wore heavy armour for extra protection so that they could fire at close range.

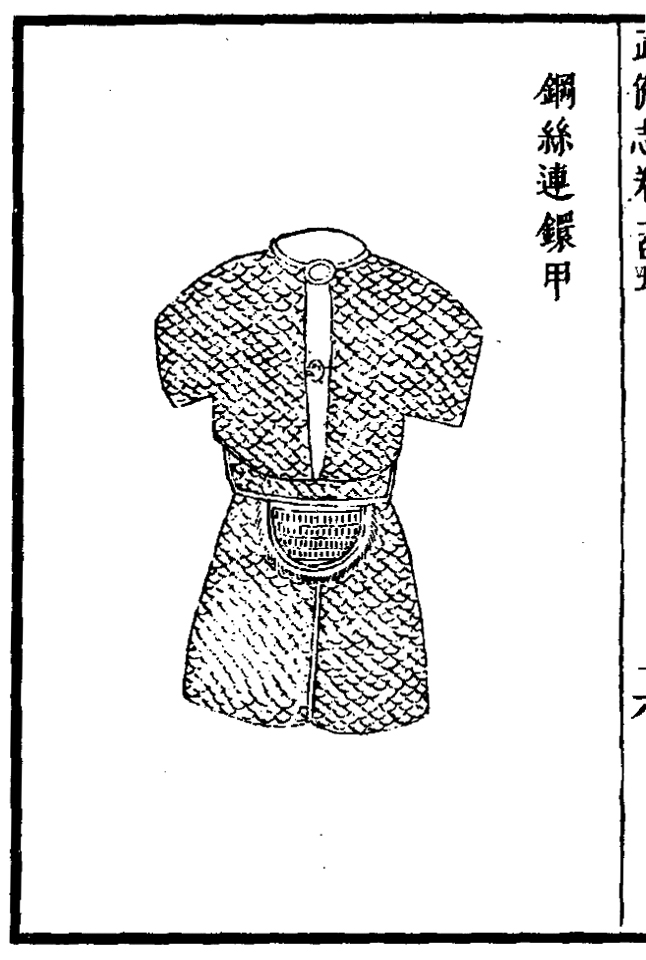
Ming depiction of mail armour - it looks like scale, but this was a common artistic convention. The text says "steel wire connecting ring armour."

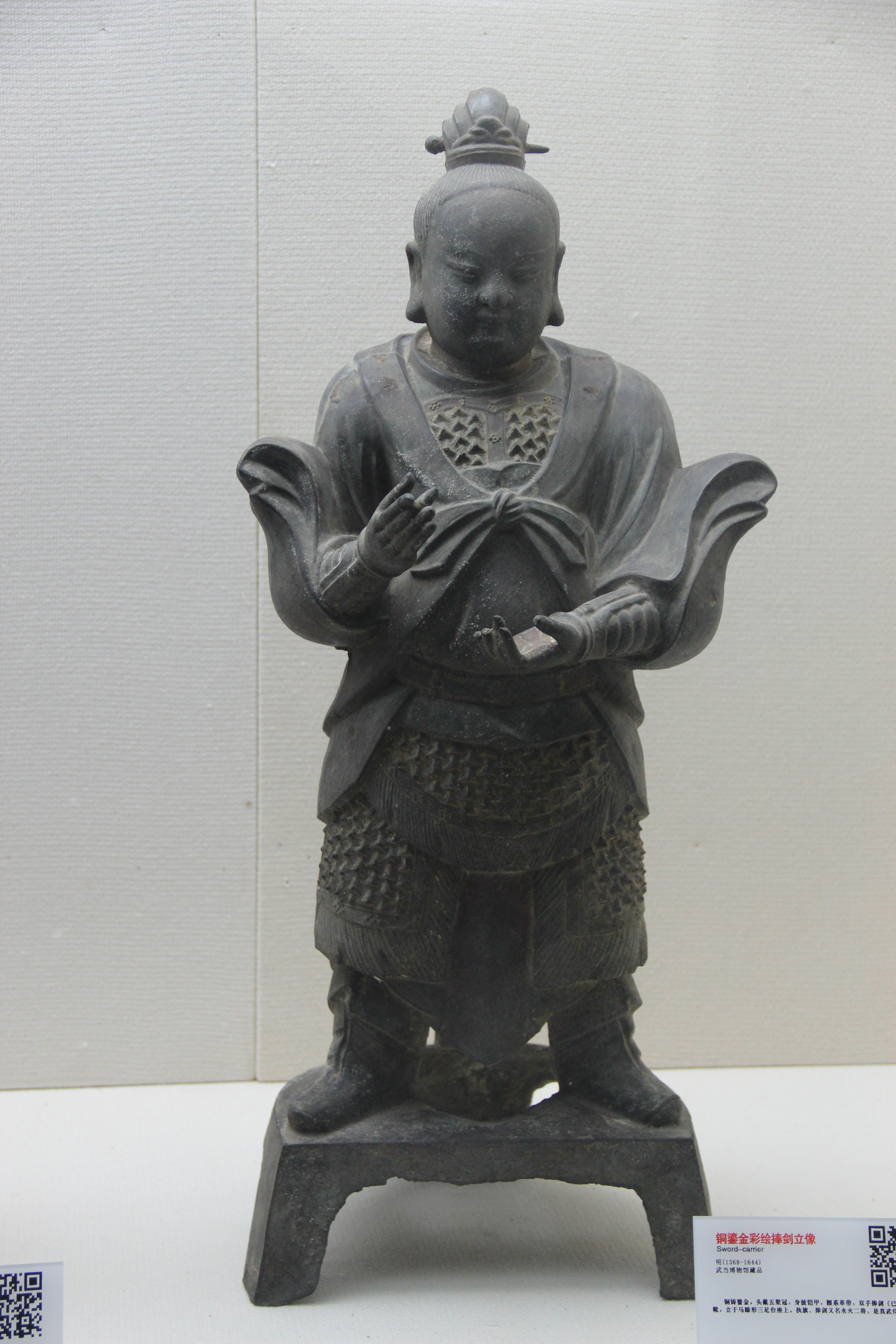
Ming statuette wearing mountain pattern armour

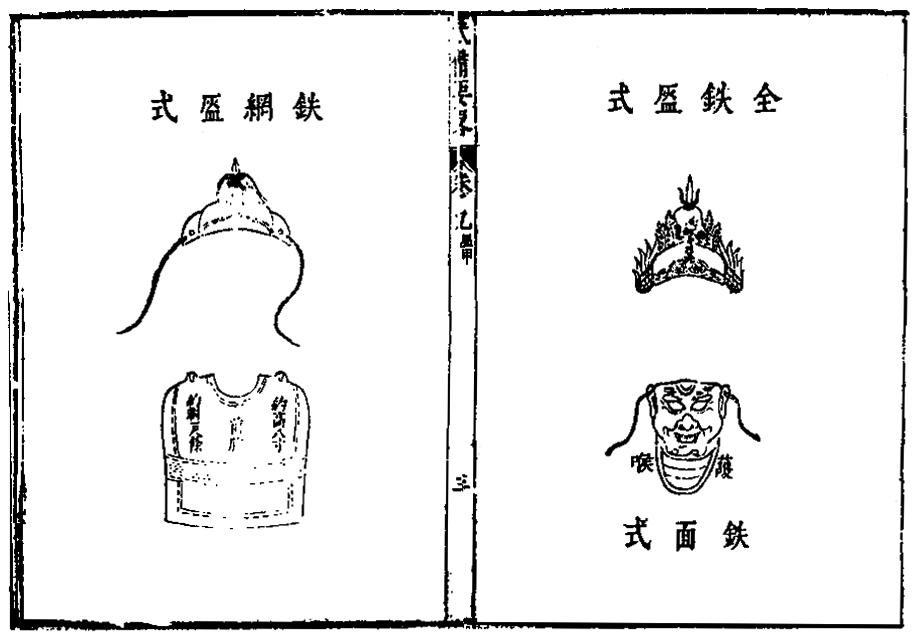
Ming helmet, breastplate, and mask from the Wubei Yaolue

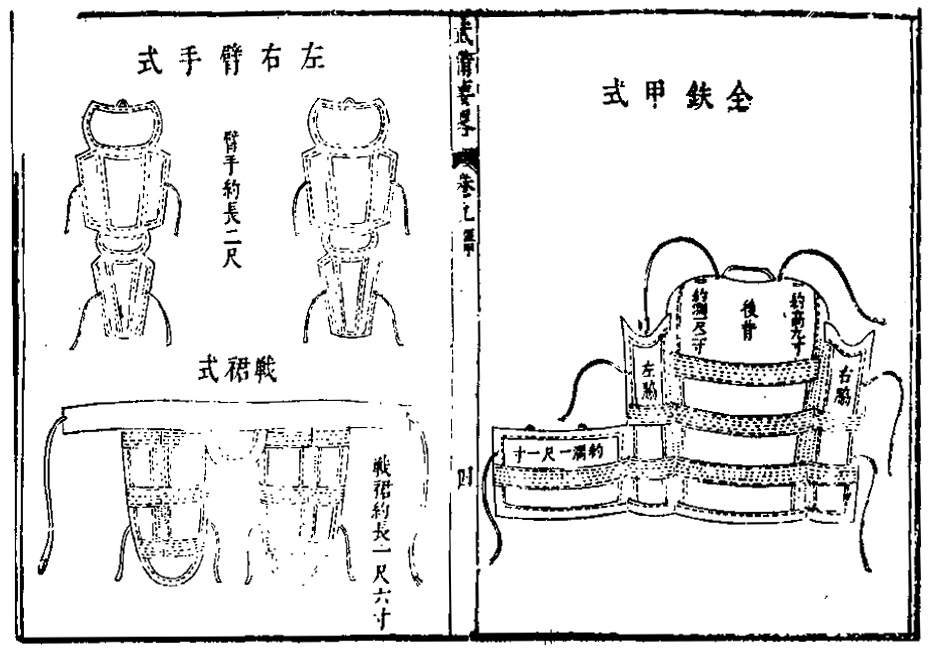
Ming arm guards, thigh armour, and back plate from the Wubei Yaolue

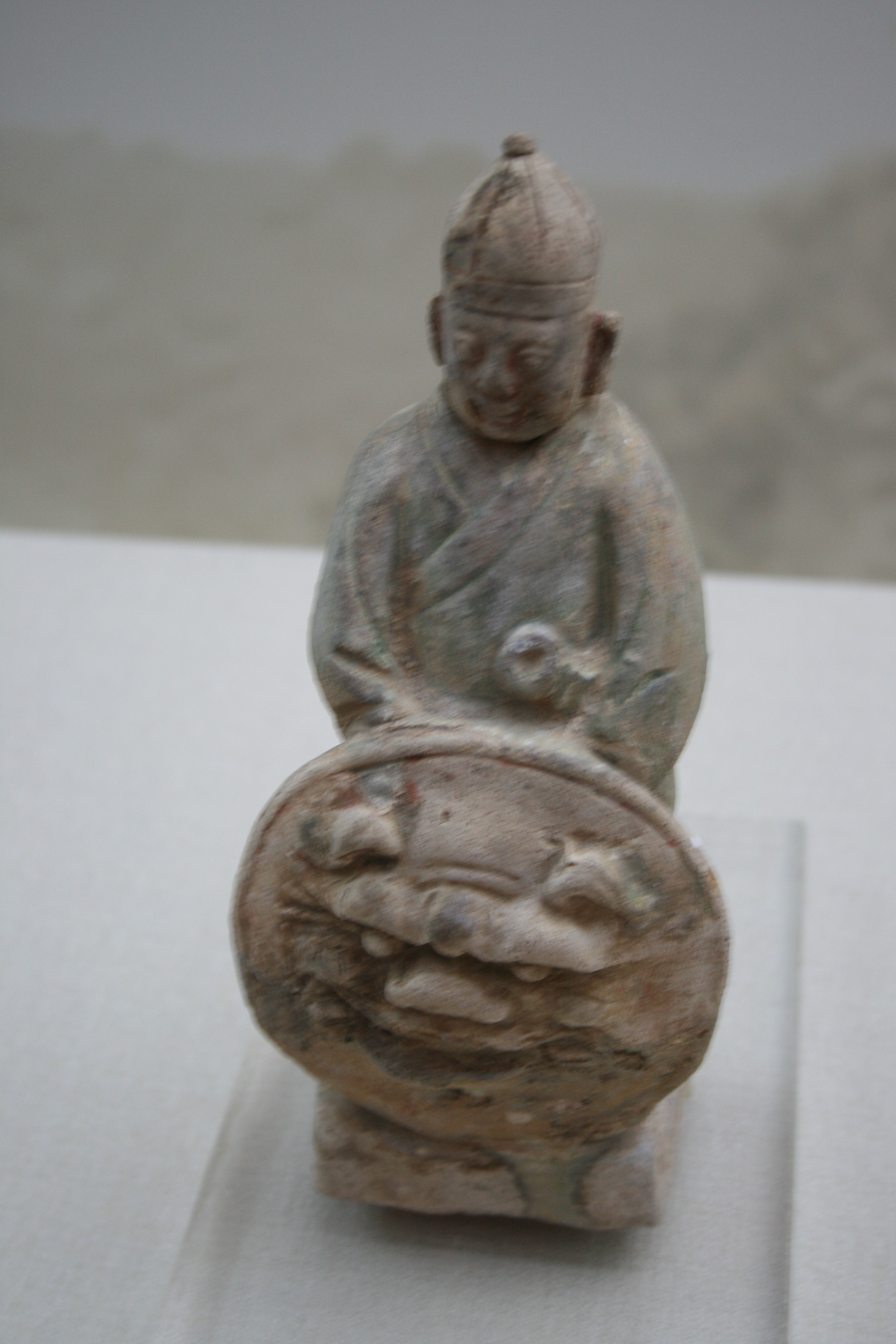
Ming shieldbearer

== Formations ==
=== Jixiao Xinshu ===
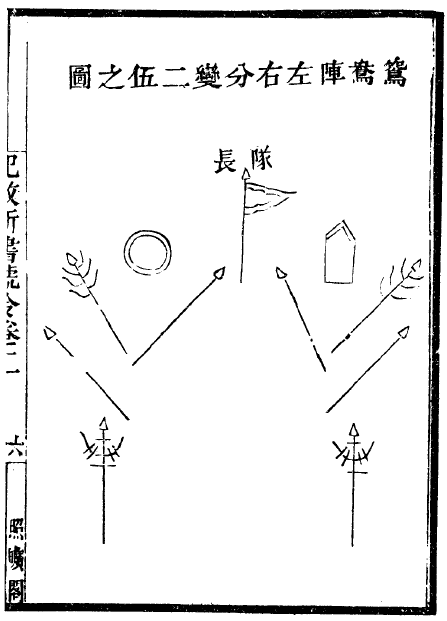
Second Power Formation

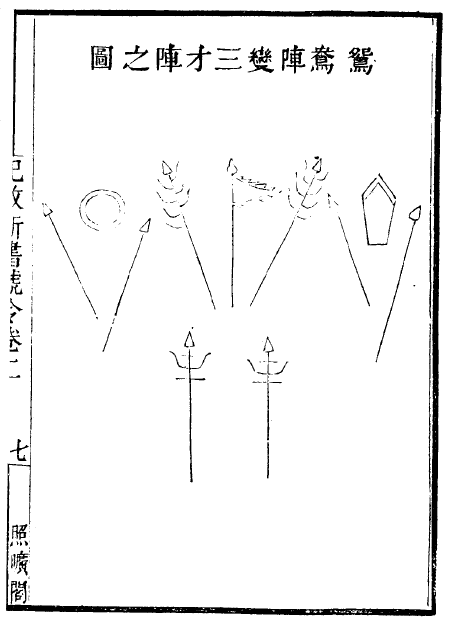
Third Power Formation

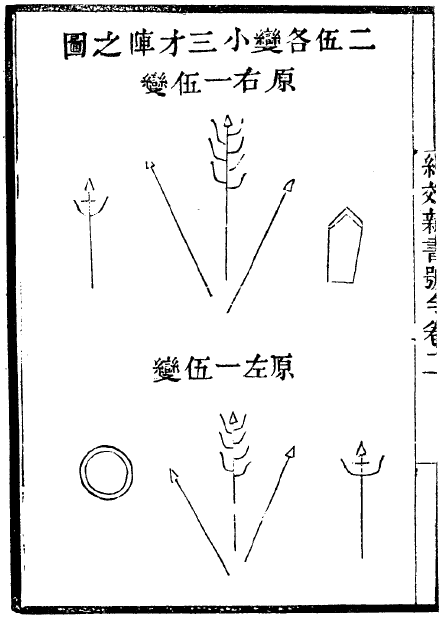
Lesser Third Power Formation

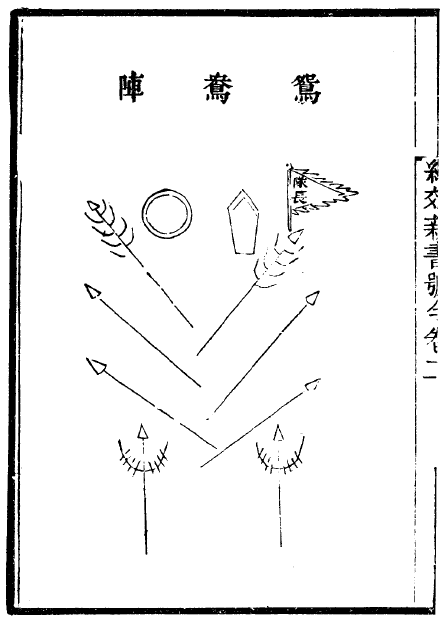
Mandarin Duck Formation

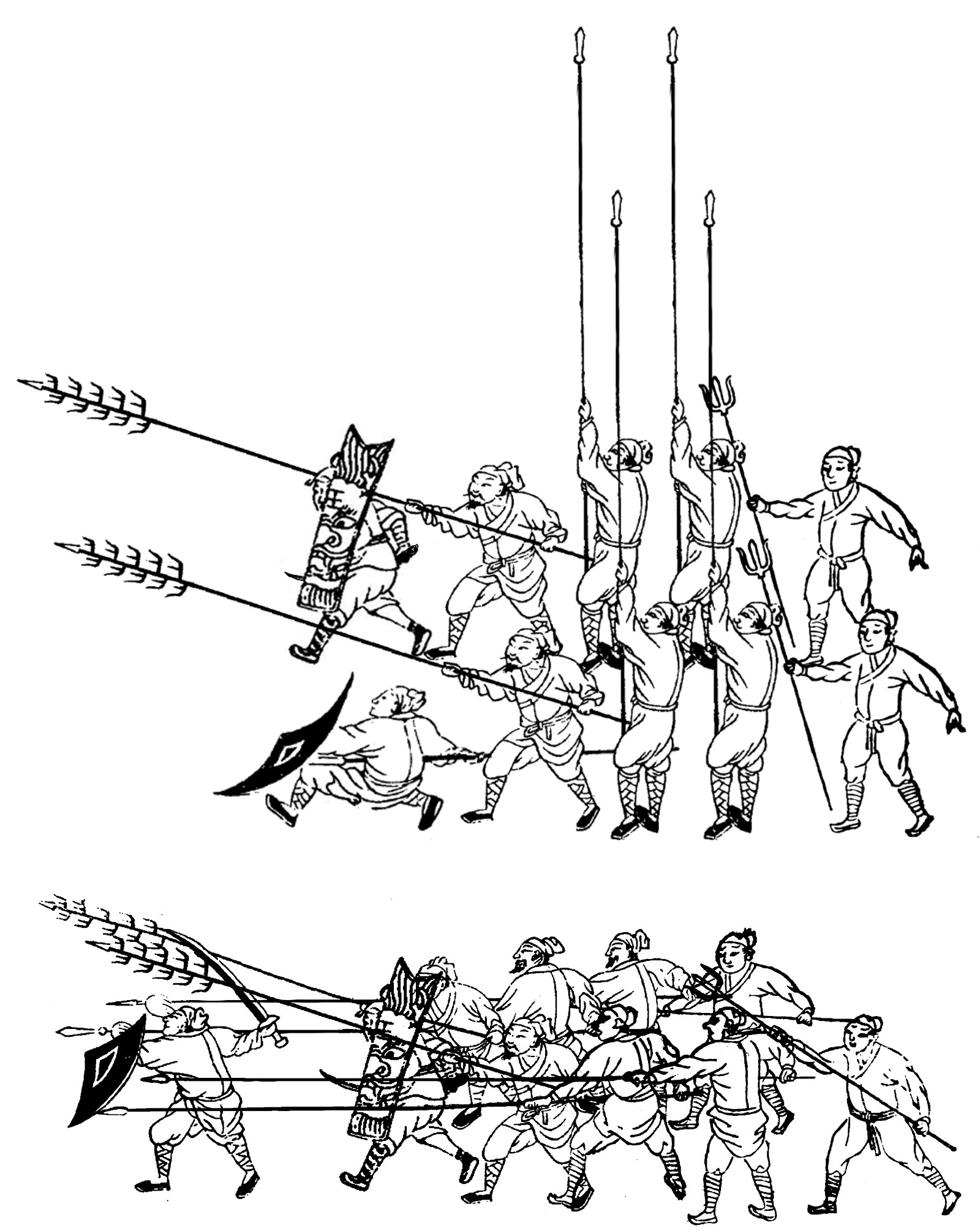
Qi Jiguang's 'mandarin duck formation' in standby and combat.

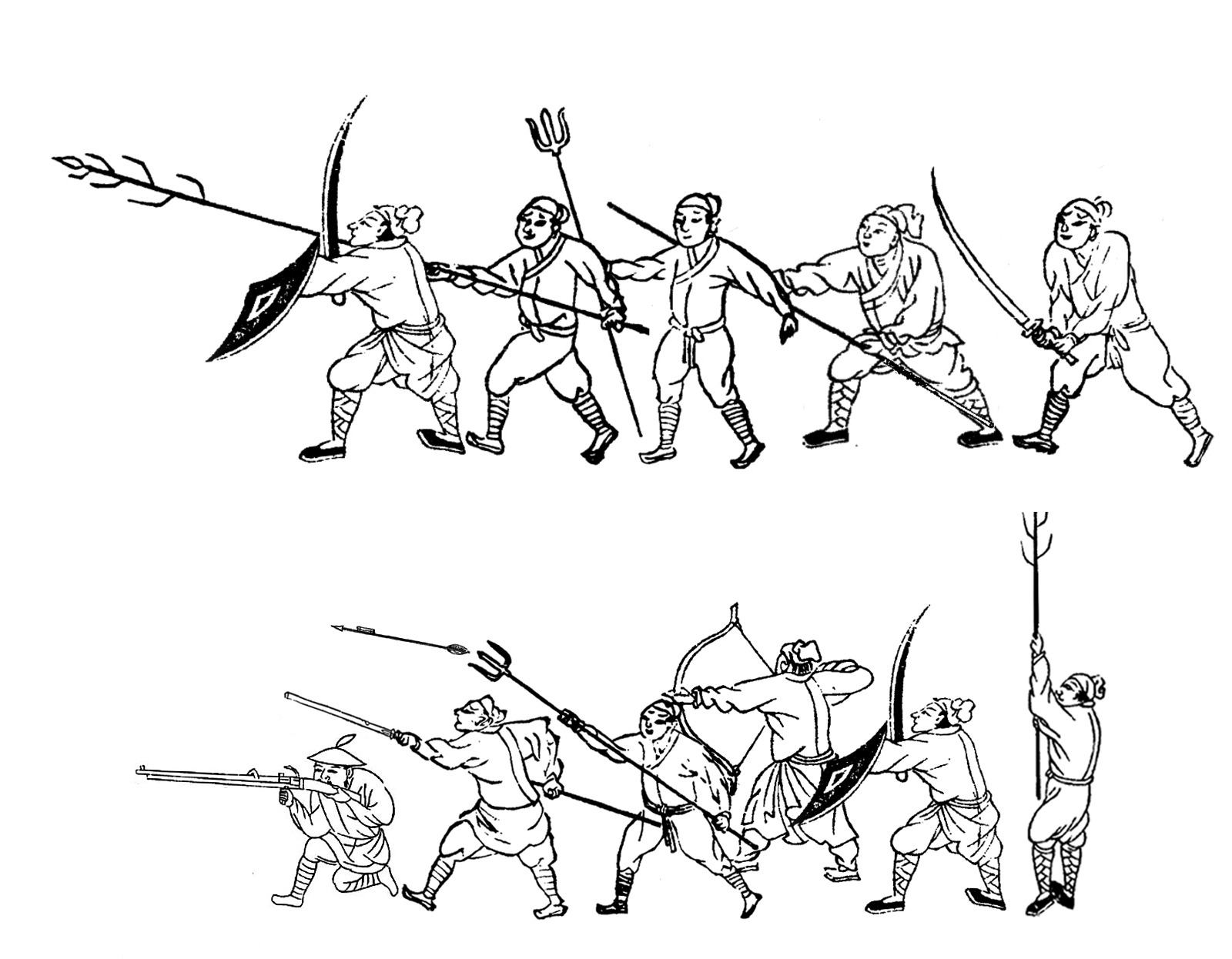
Qi Jiguang's 'new mandarin duck formation.'

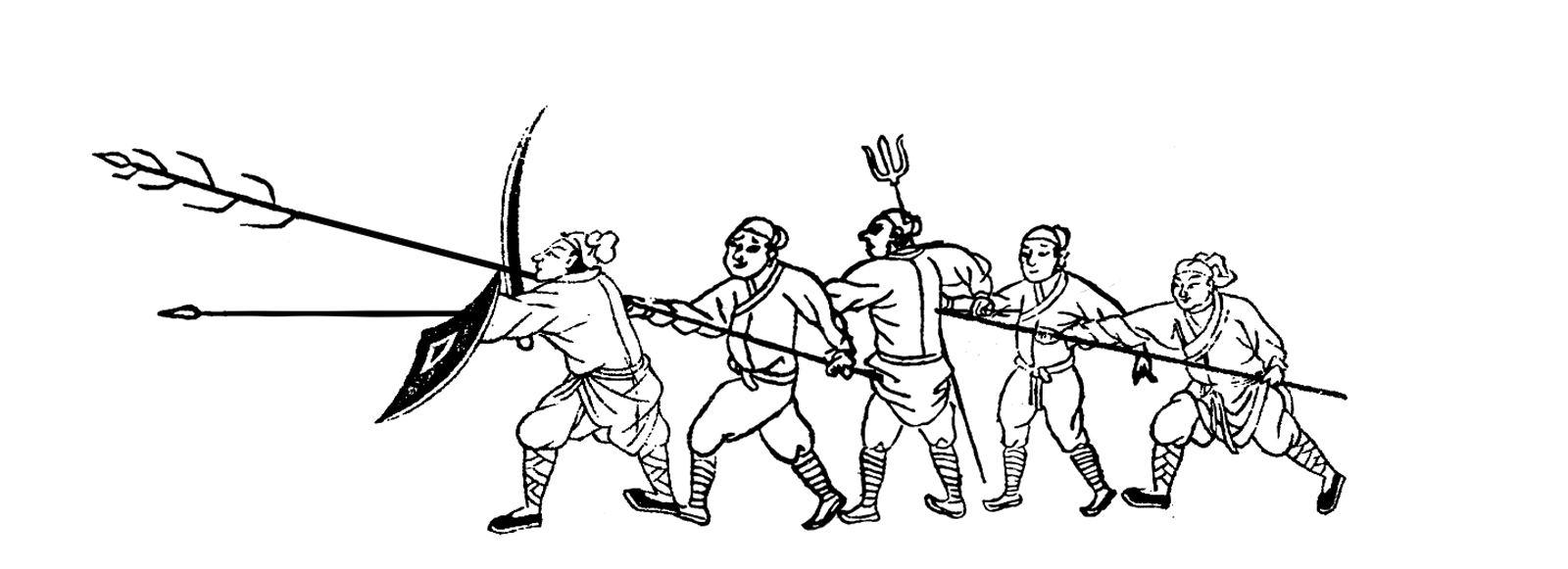
Qi Jiguang's 'killer squad.' The killer squad was a reconfigured Mandarin Duck formation.

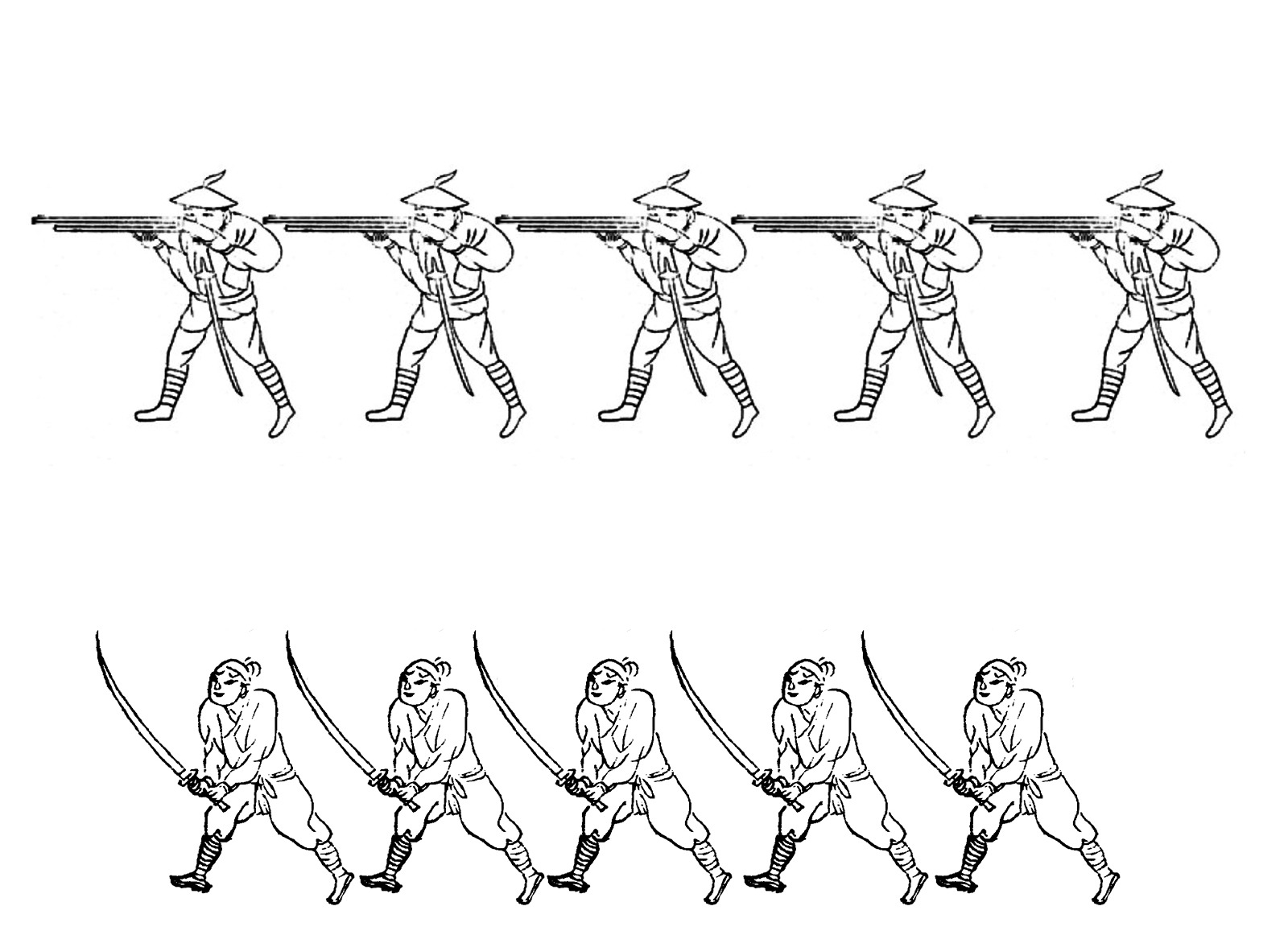
Qi Jiguang's 'firearm squad.'

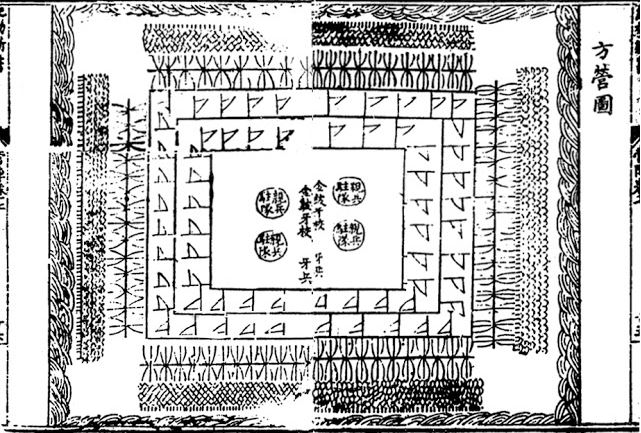
Square formation

=== Lianbing Zaji ===
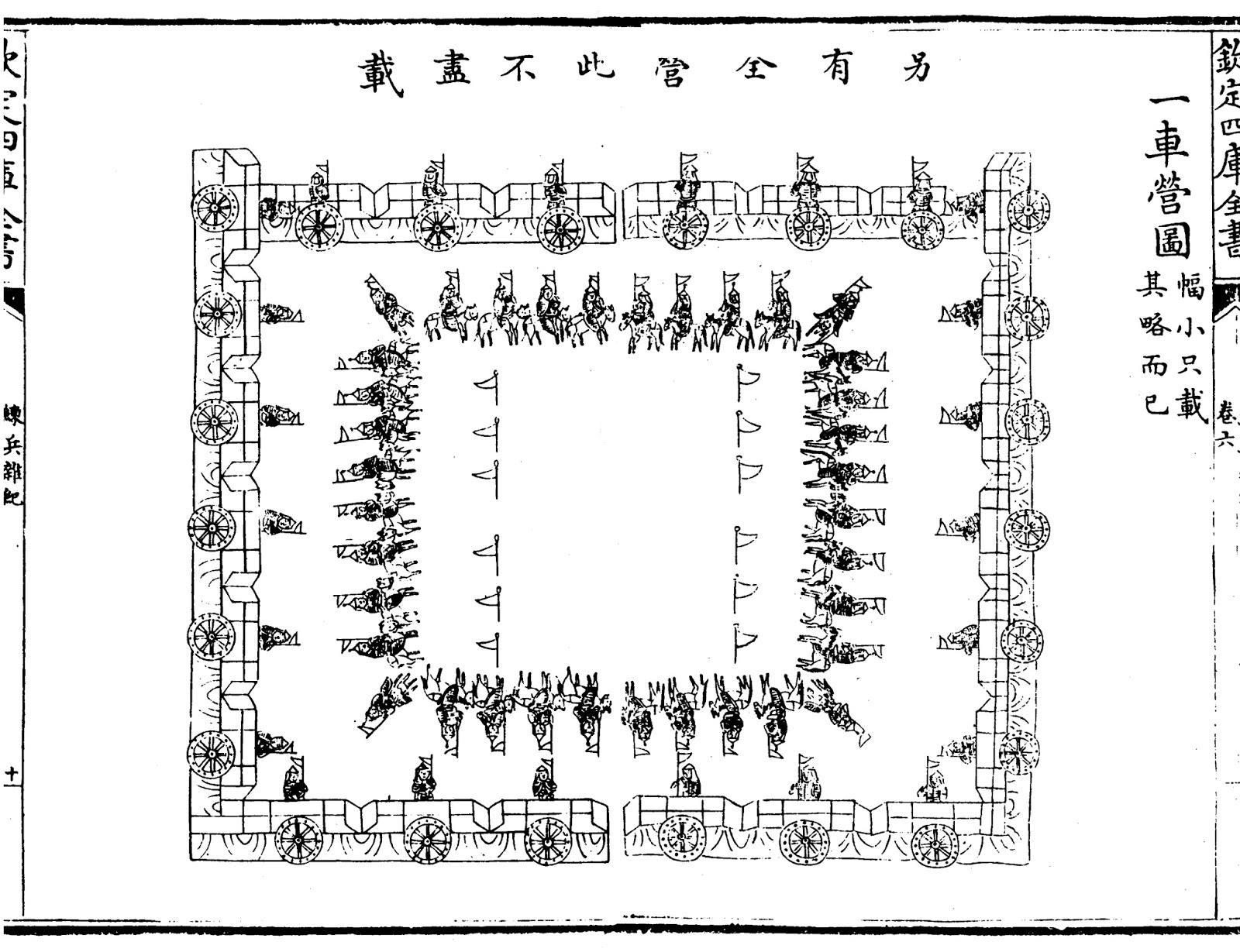
Cart encampment

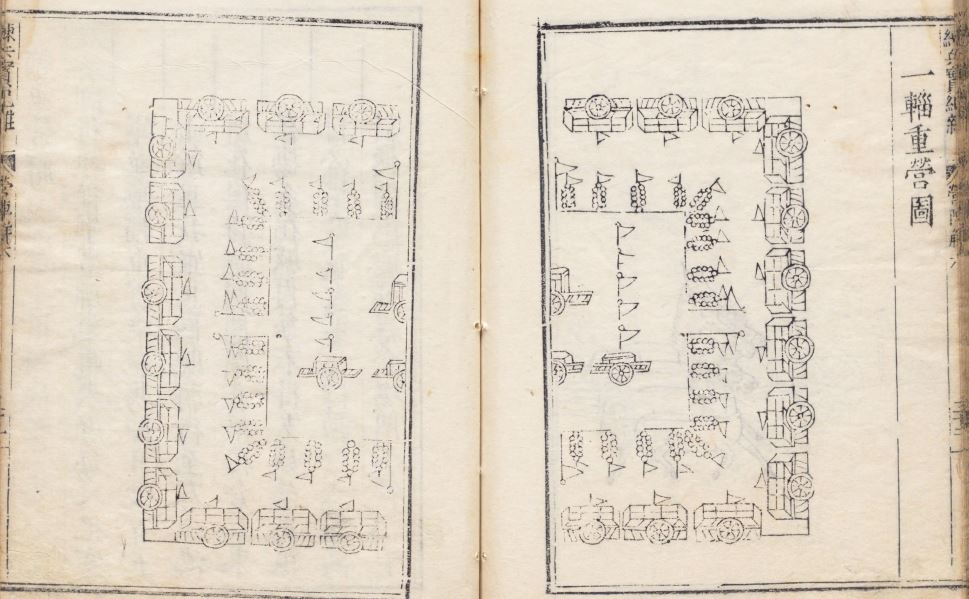
Supply cart encampment

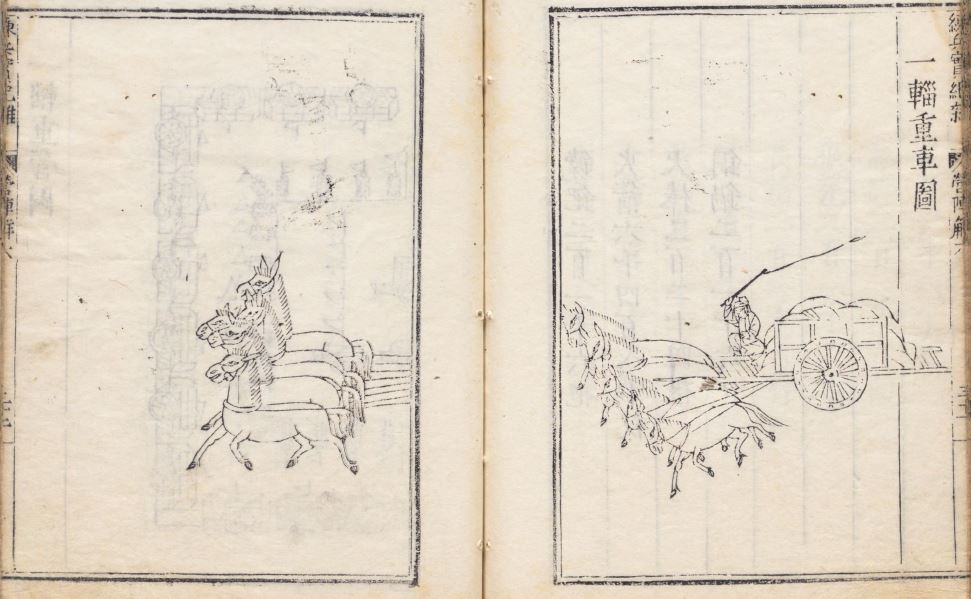
Supply cart

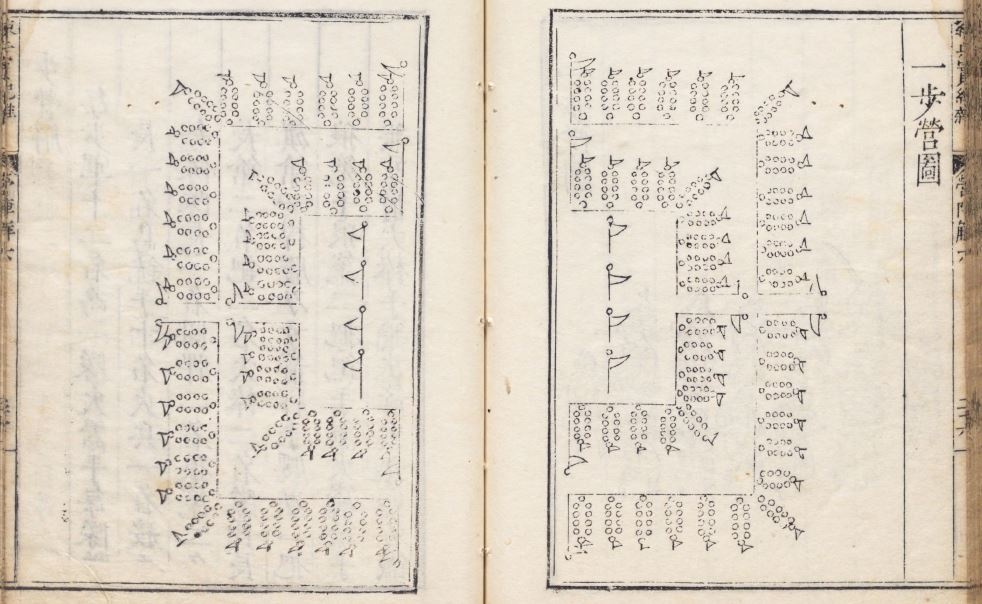
Infantry encampment

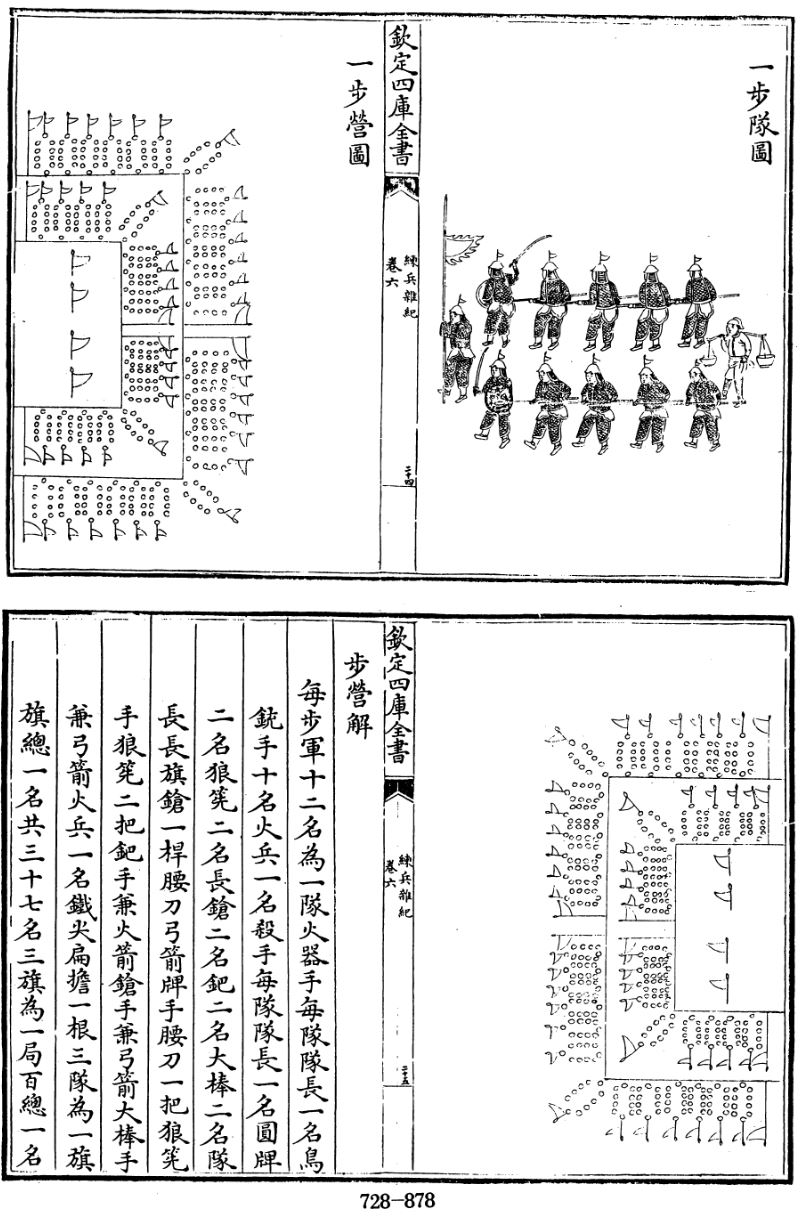
Infantry squad

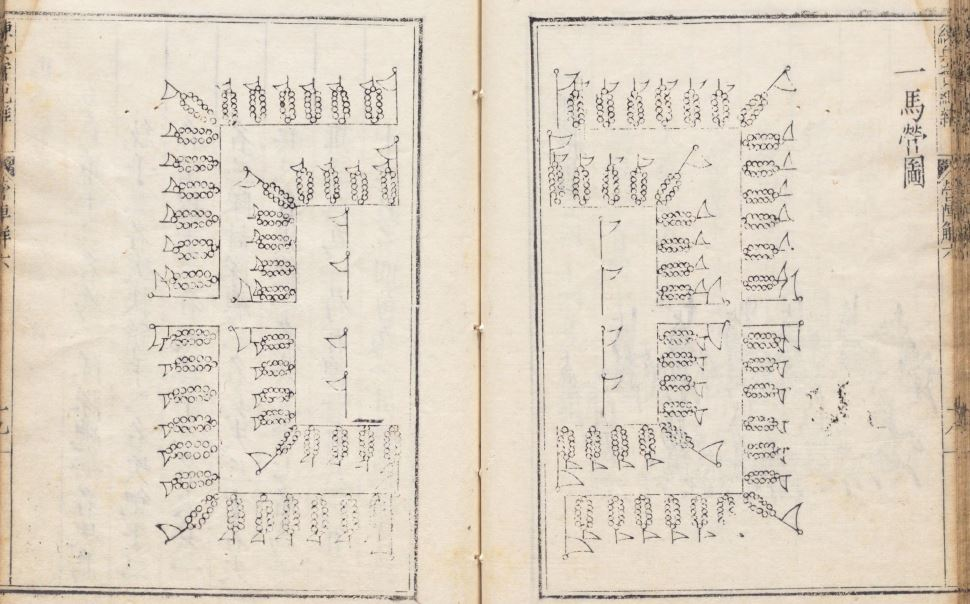
Cavalry encampment

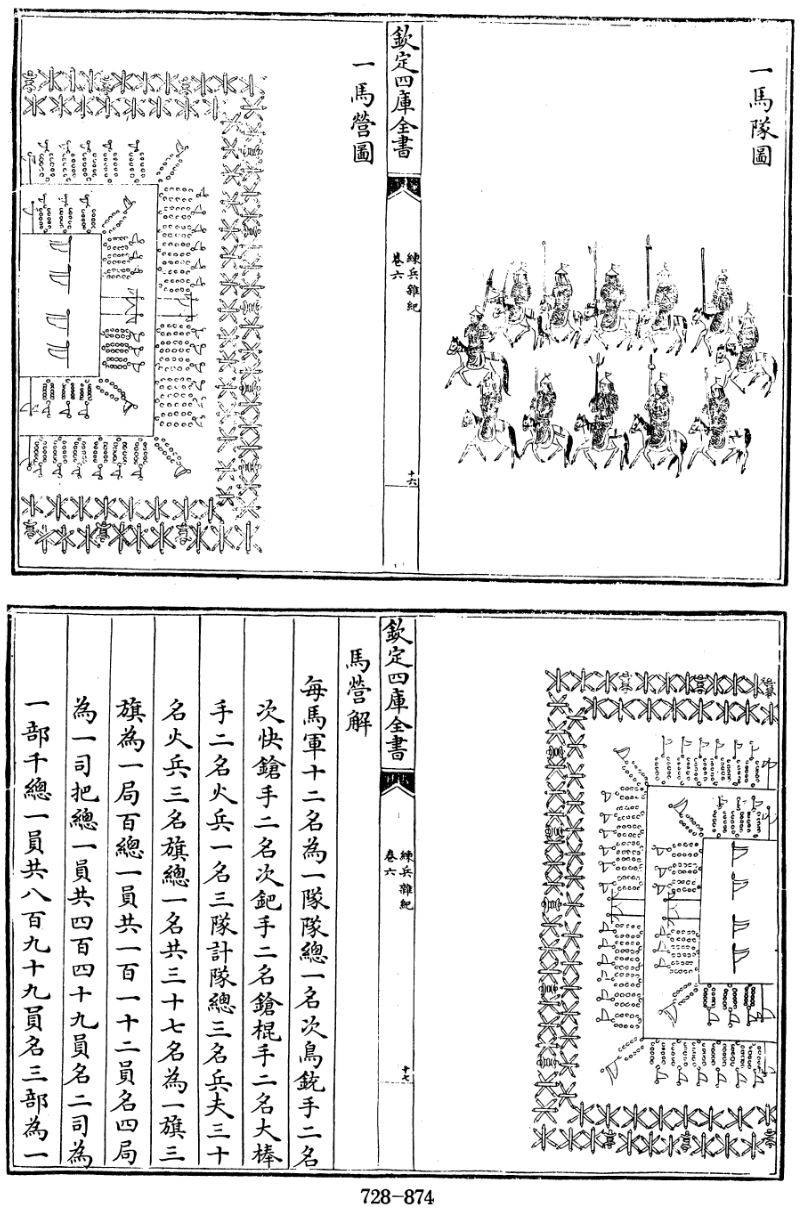
Cavalry squad

=== Binglu ===
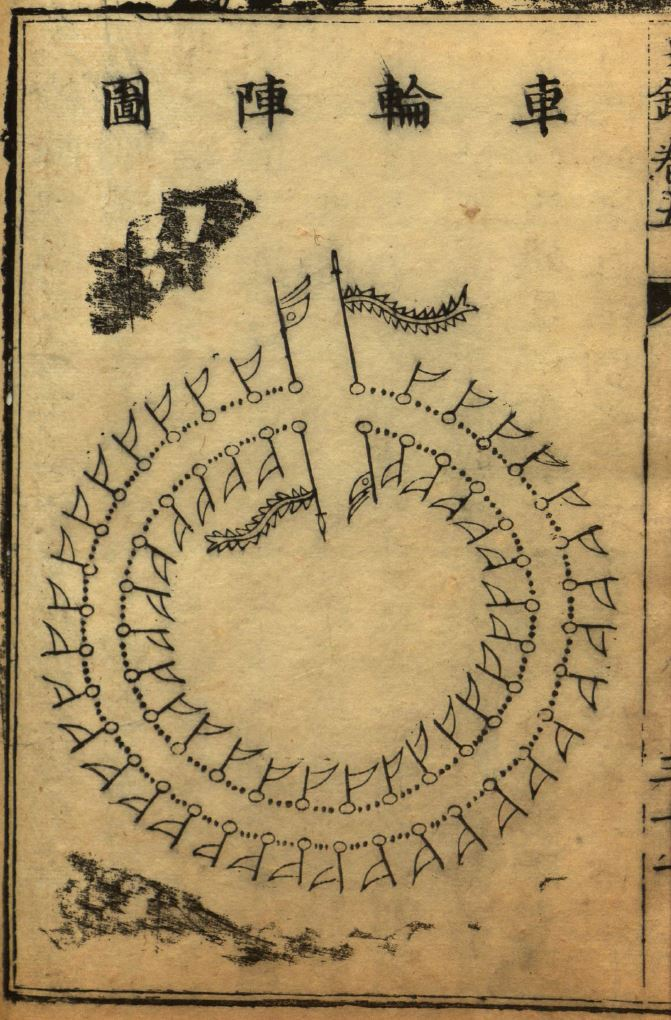
Circular cart formation

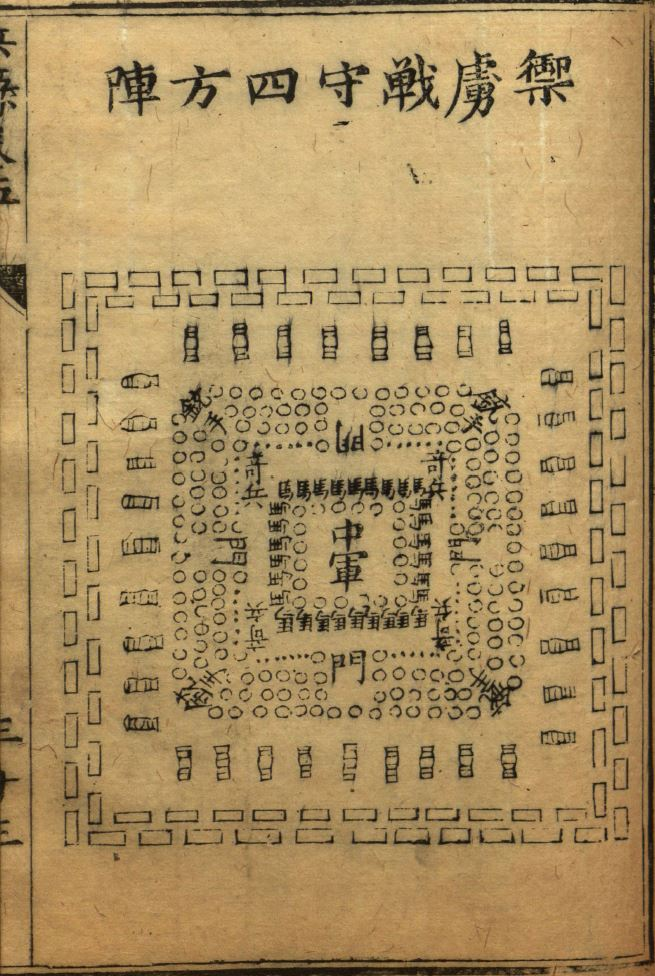
Defensive cannon formation

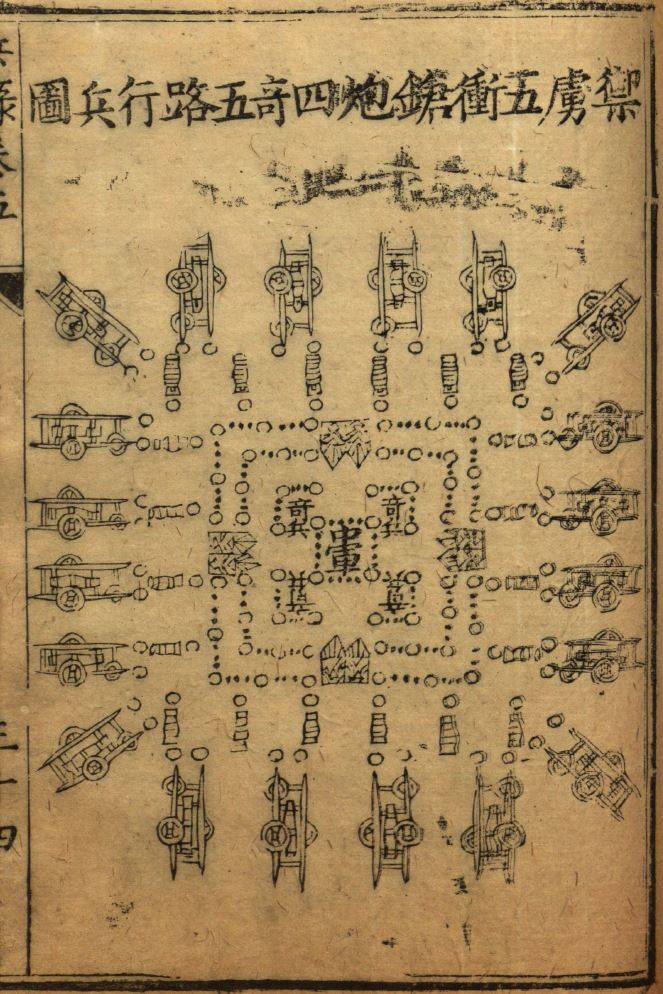
Defensive mobile cannon formation

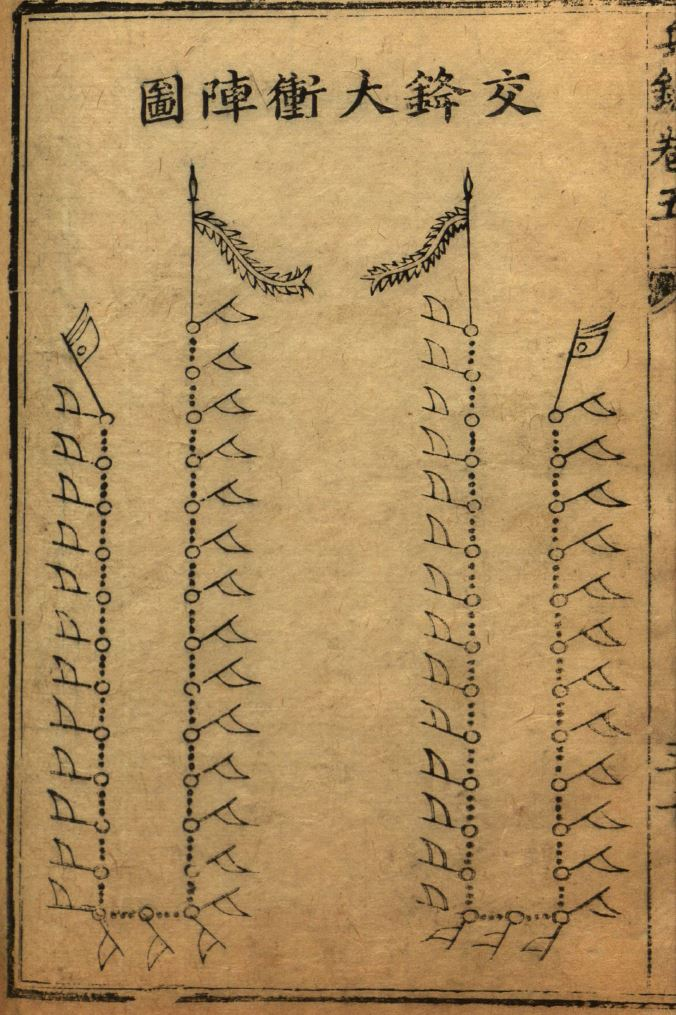
Crossing great charge formation

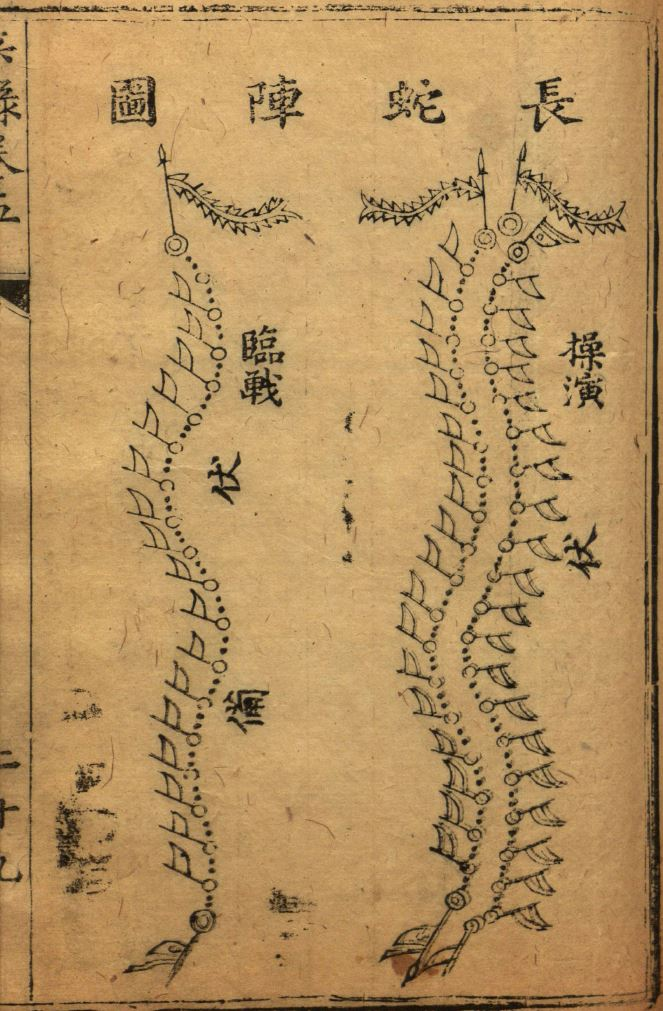
Long snake formation

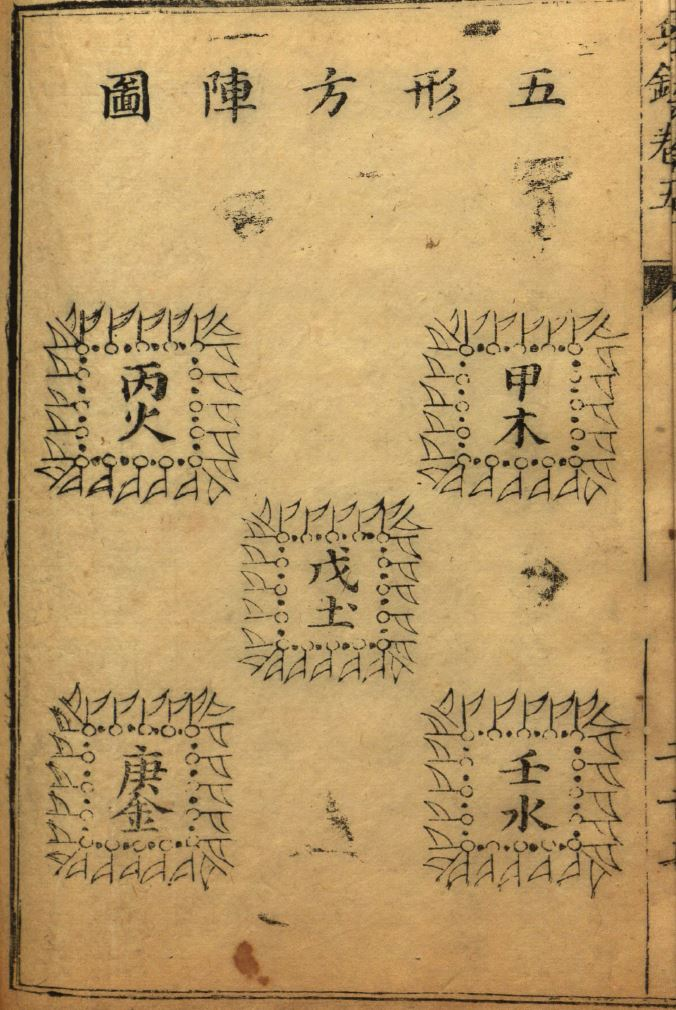
Five direction square formation

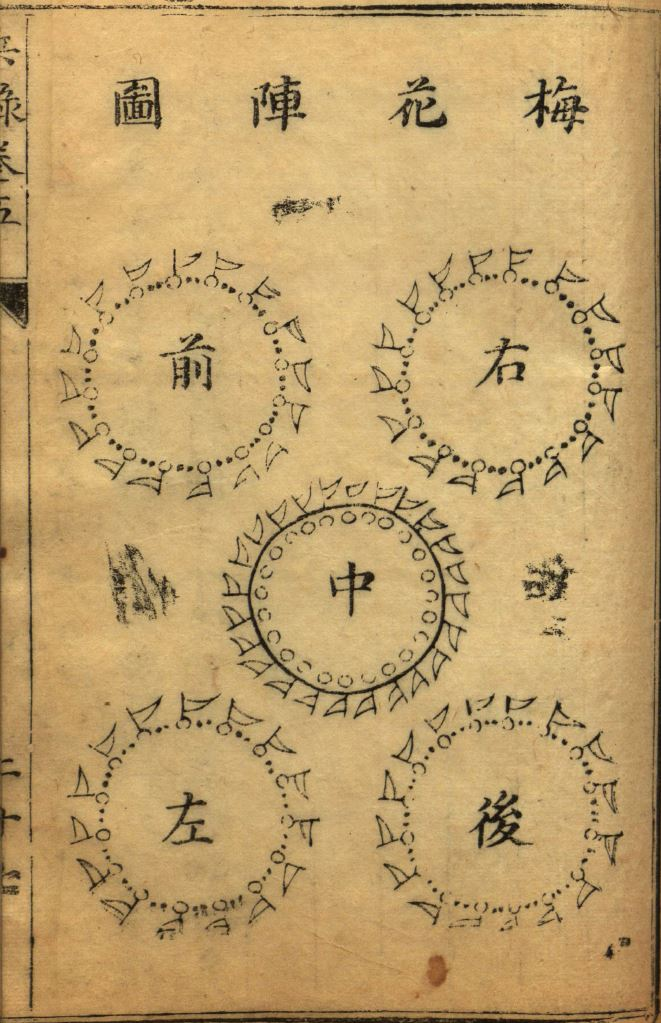
Plum flower formation

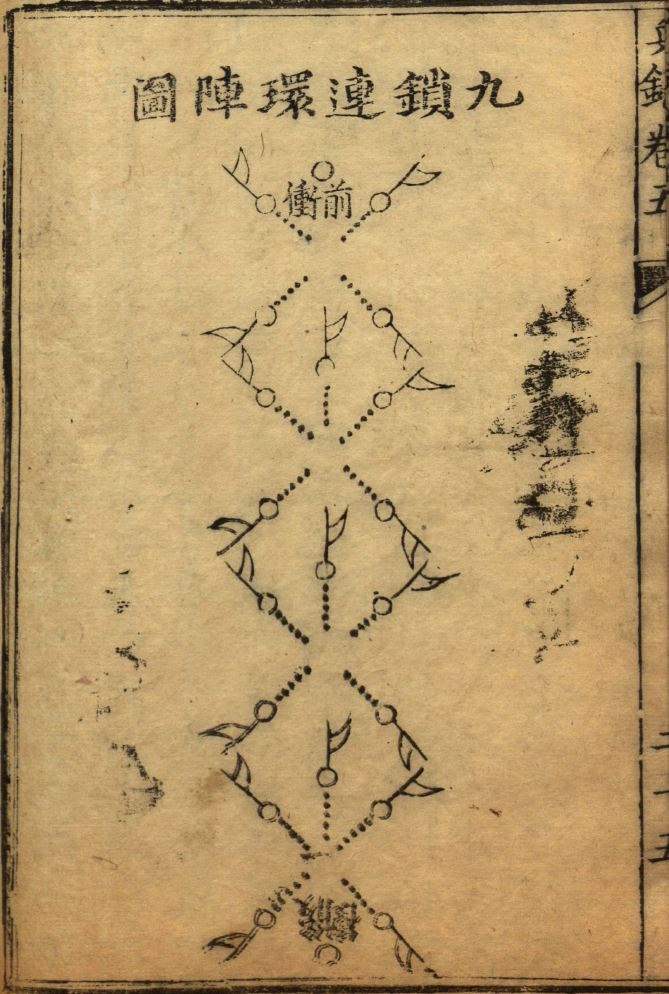
Nine-ringed chain formation

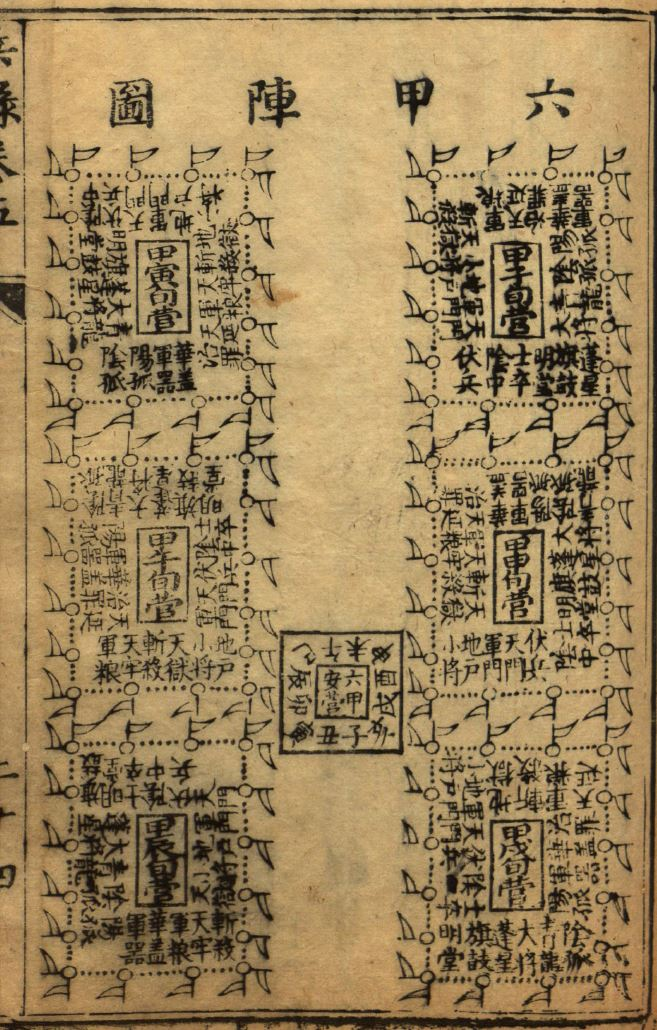
Six armour formation

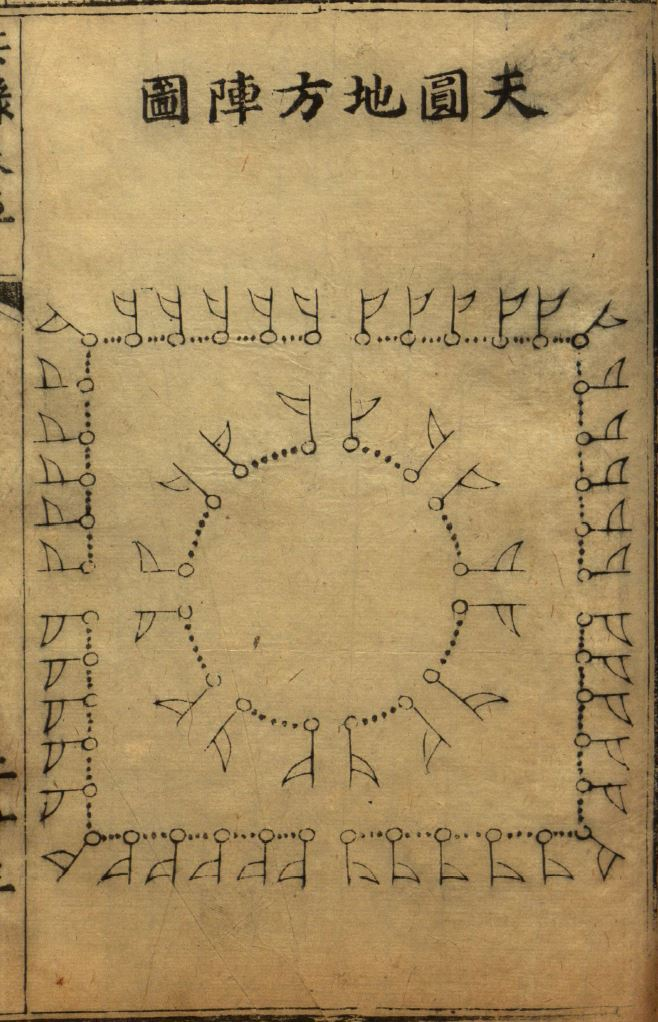
Ground square formation

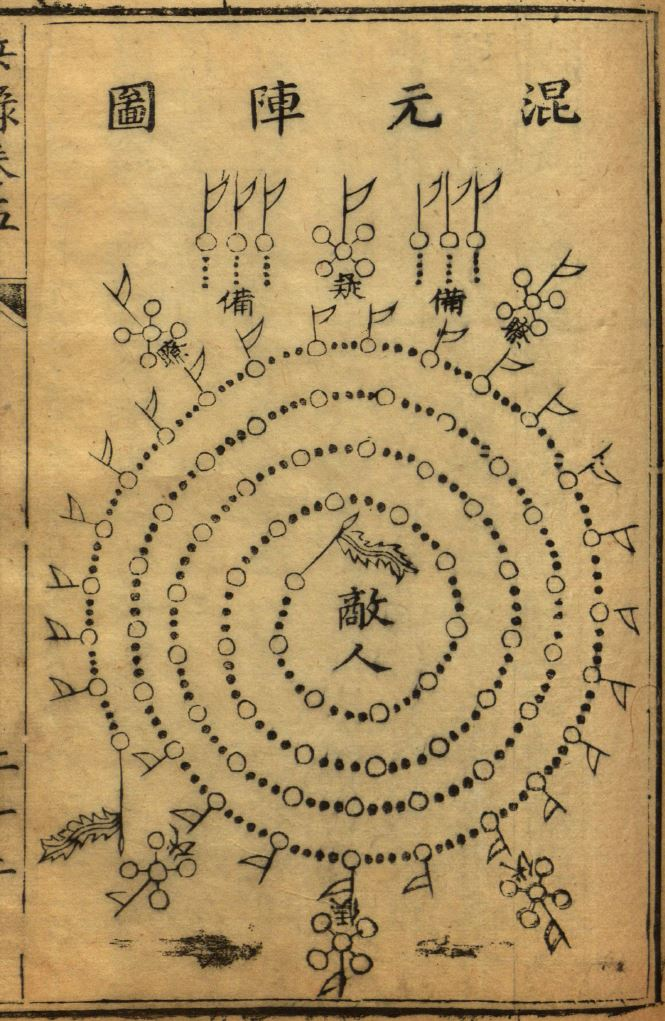
Primordial origin formation

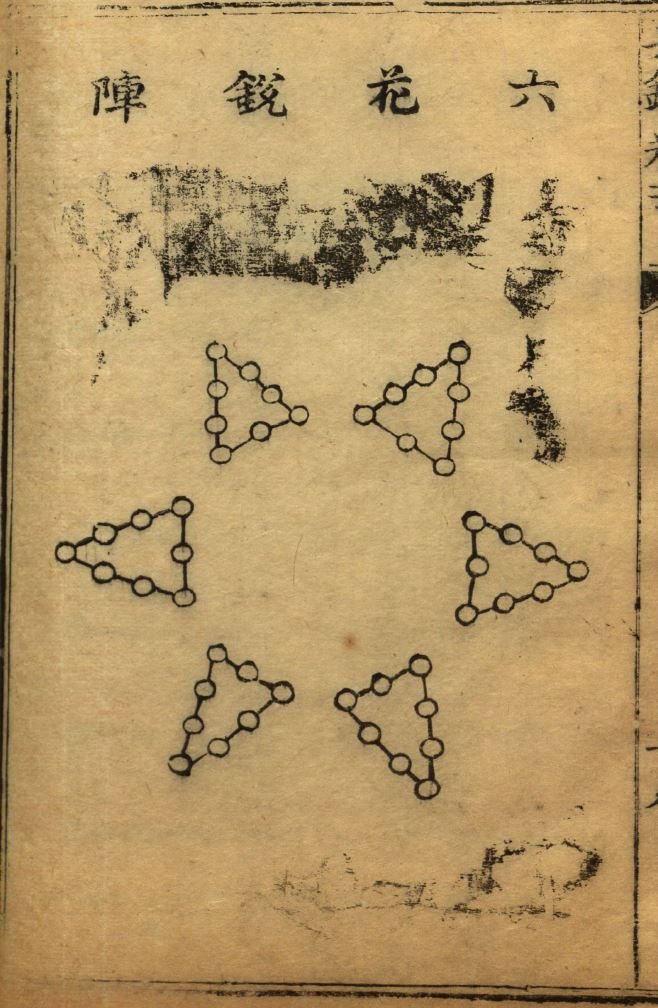
Six flower formation

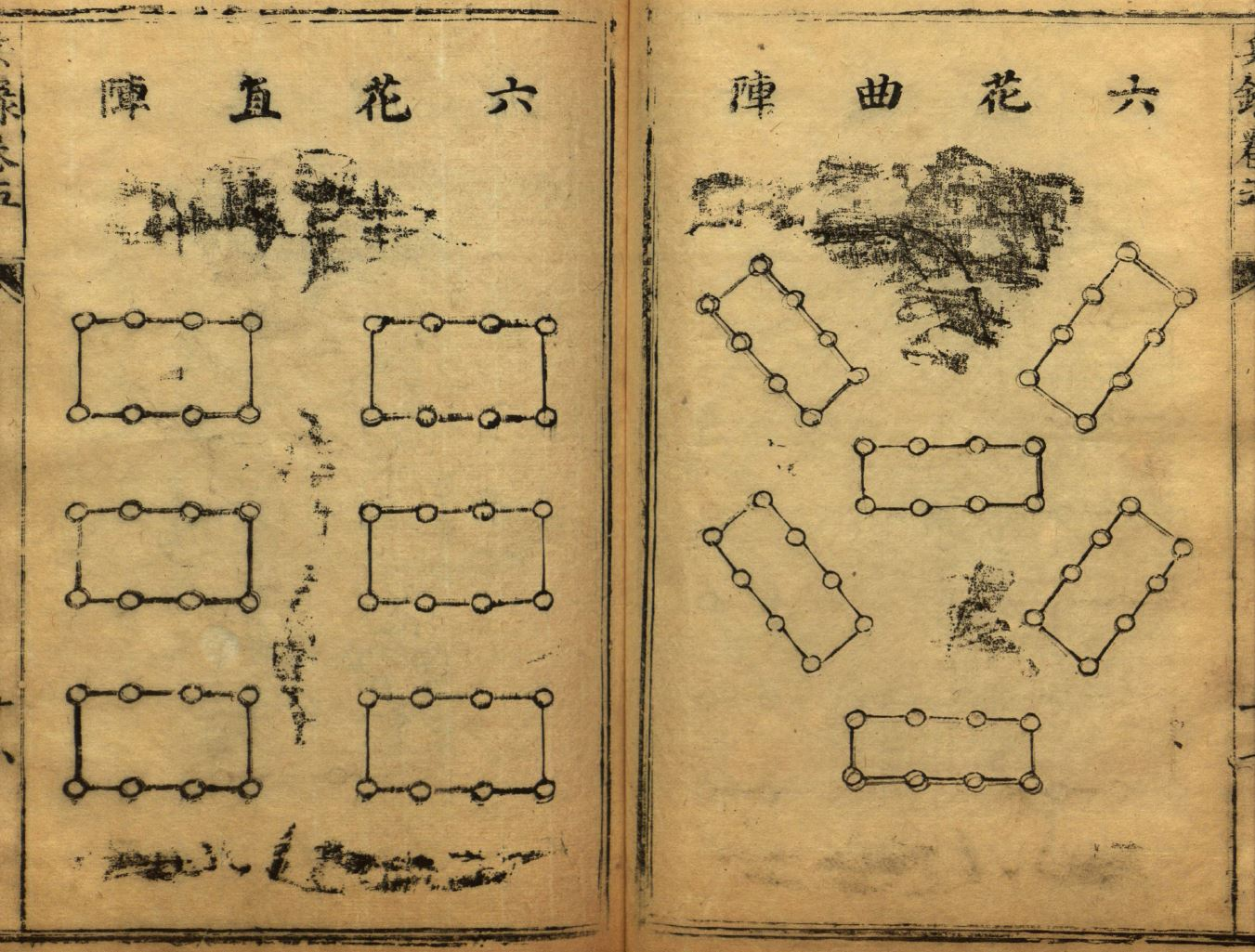
Six flower crooked and straight formations

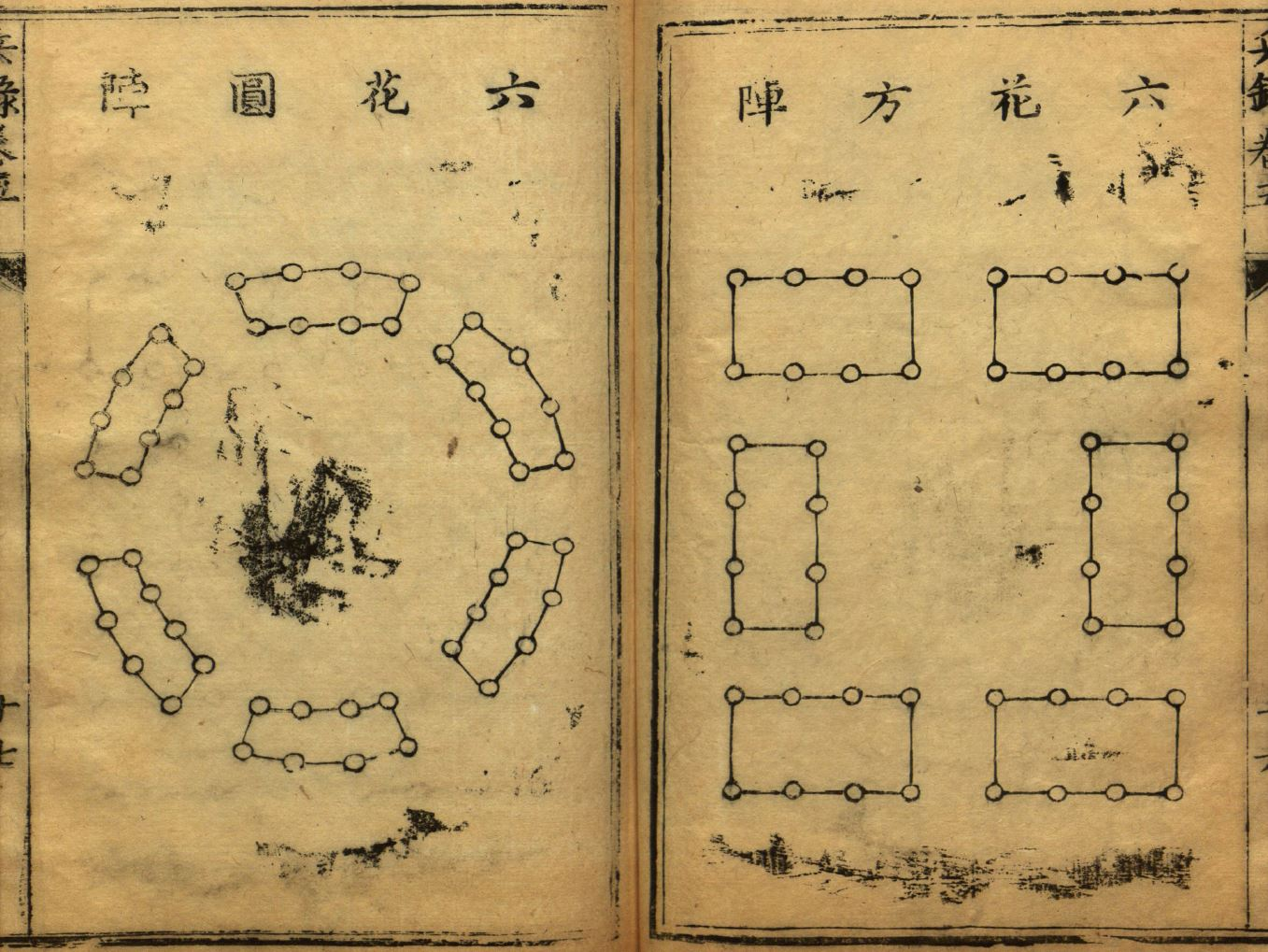
Six flower square and round formations

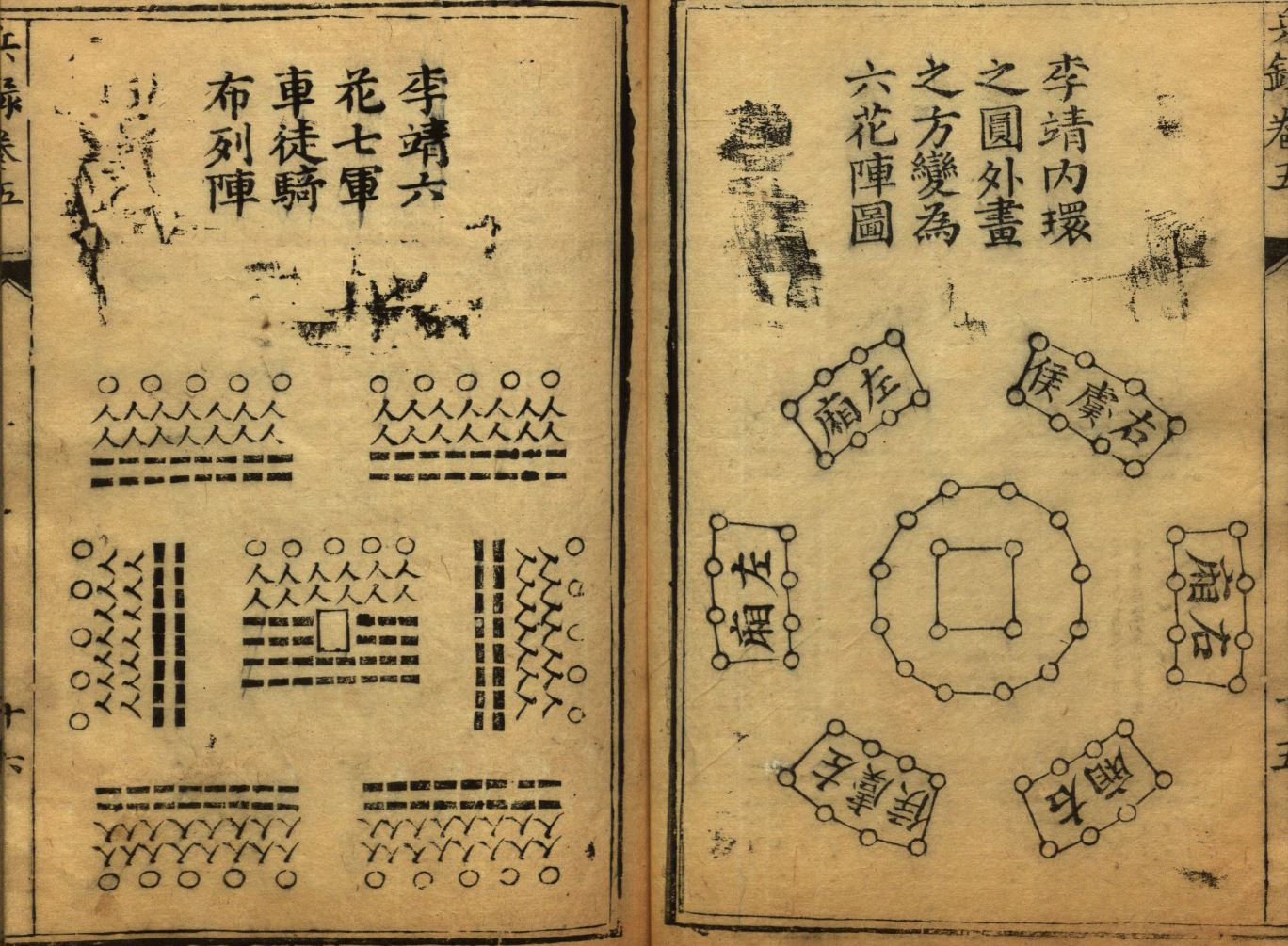
Six flower and marching formations

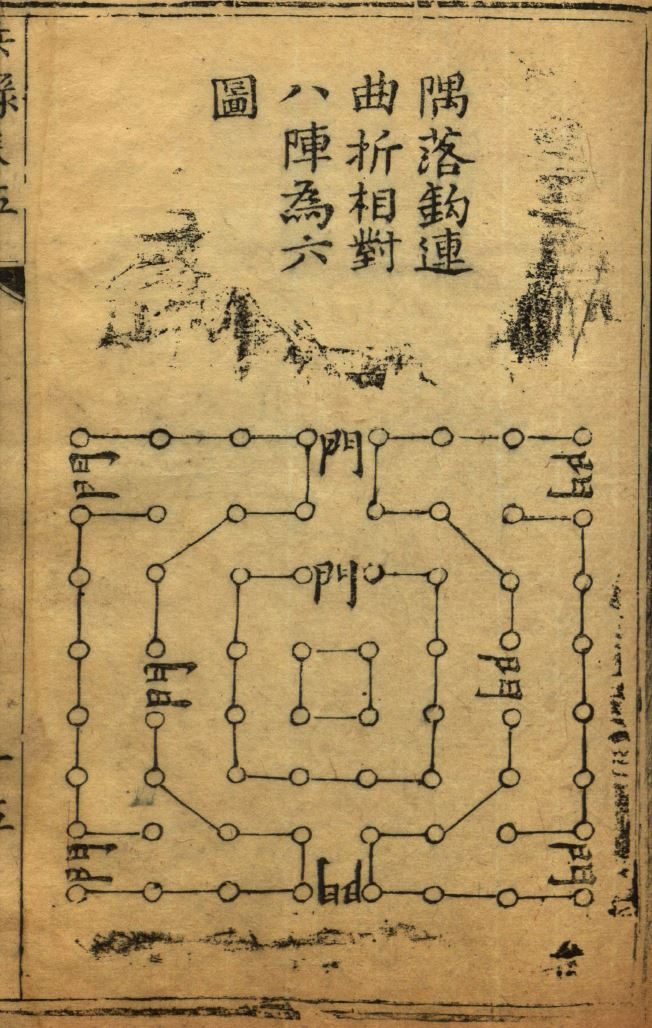
Six formation

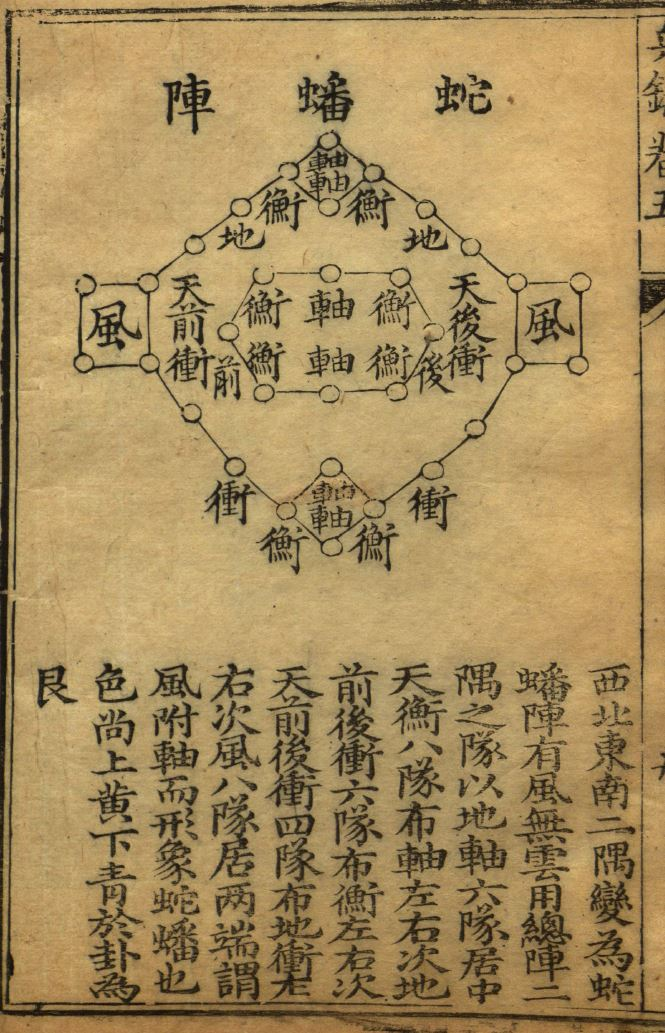
Coiling snake formation

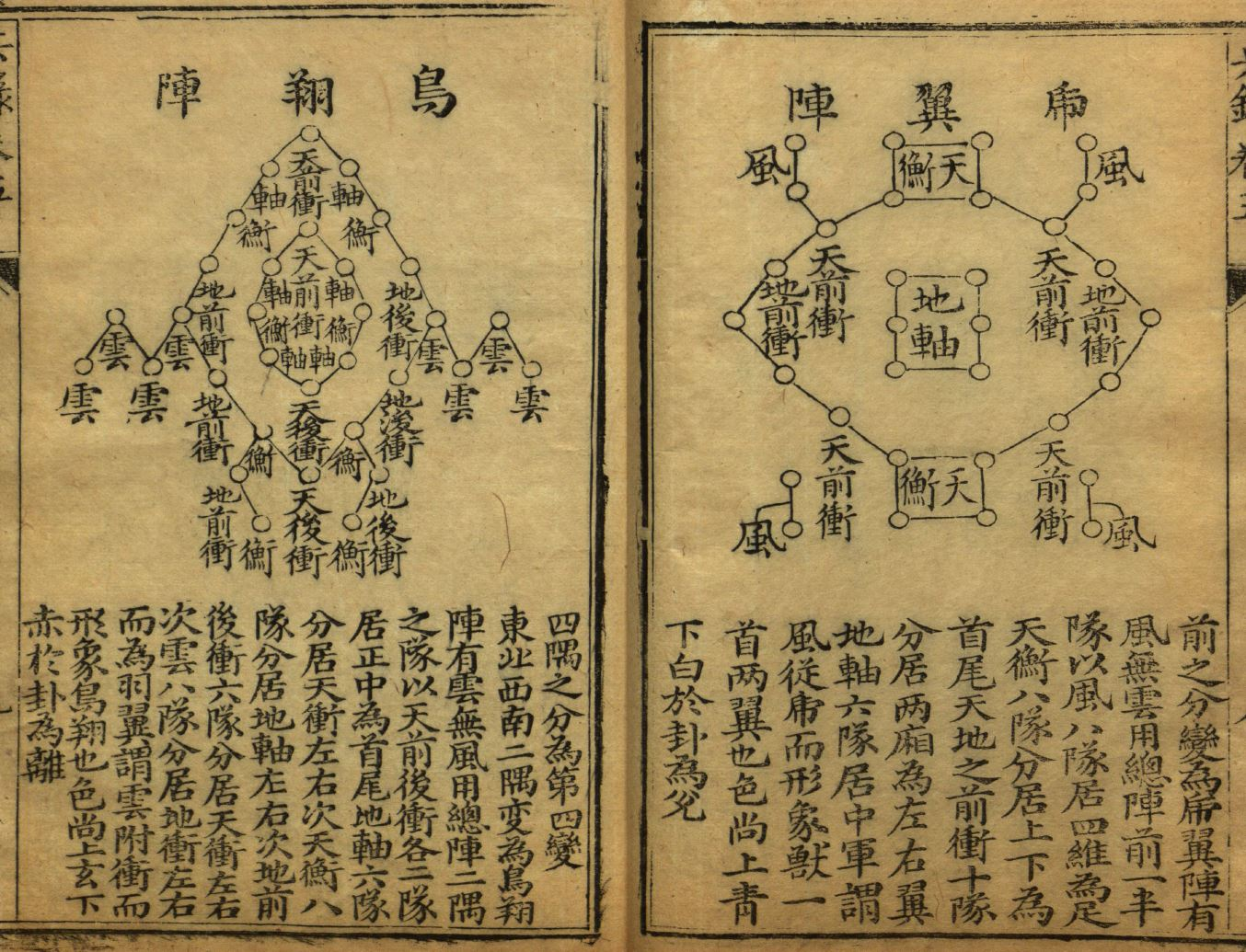
Tiger wing and bird wing formations

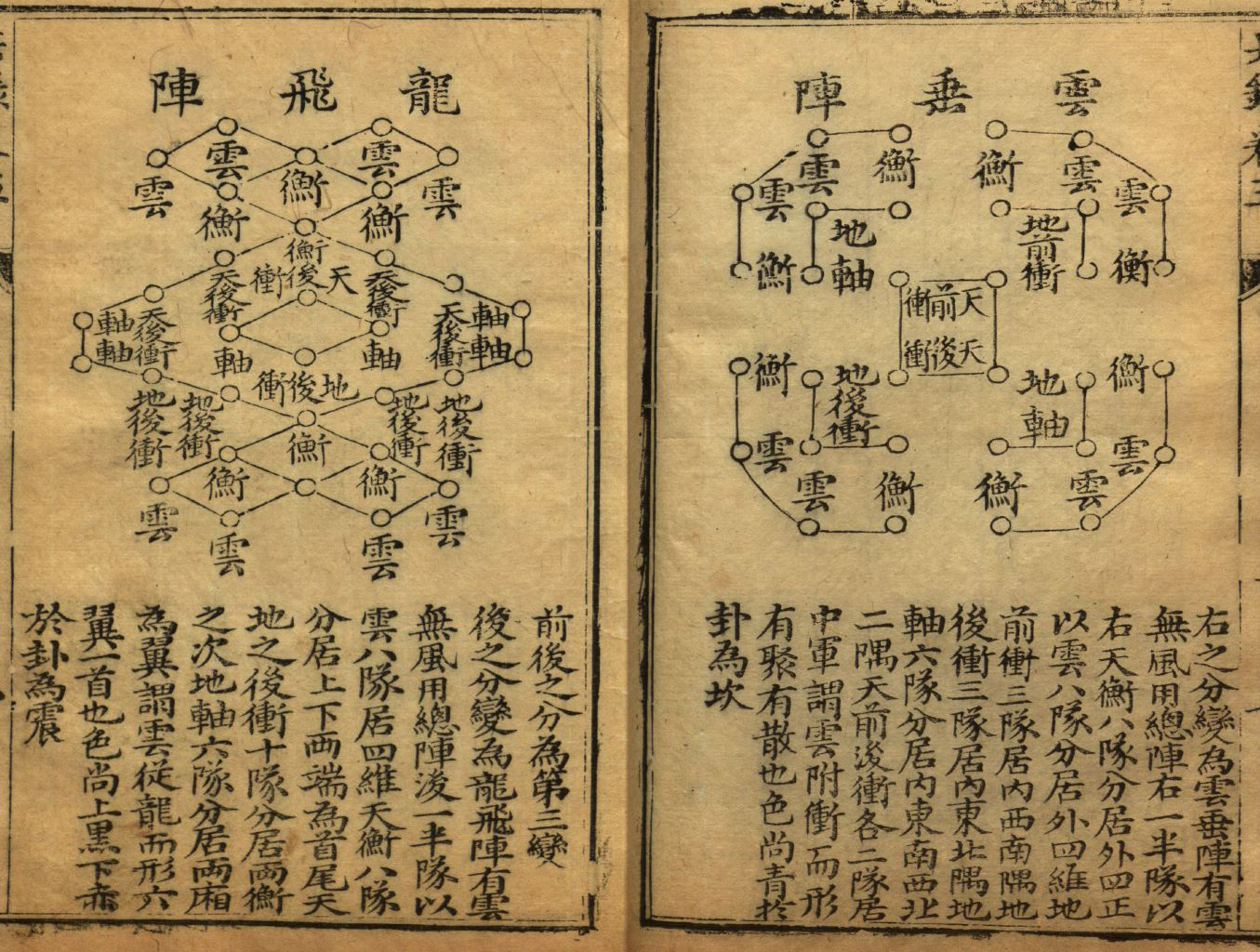
Cloud and flying dragon formations

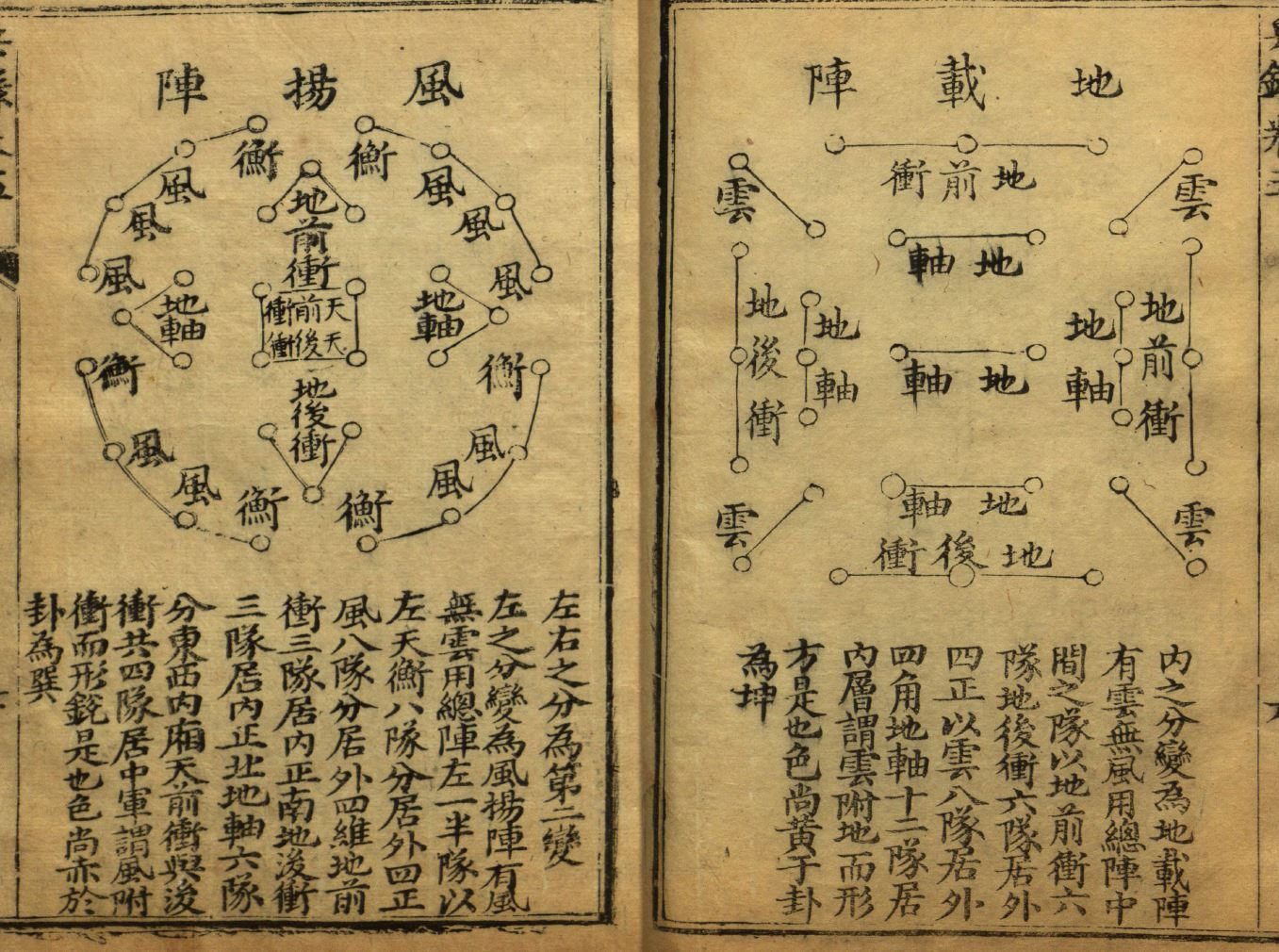
Earth holding and wind formations

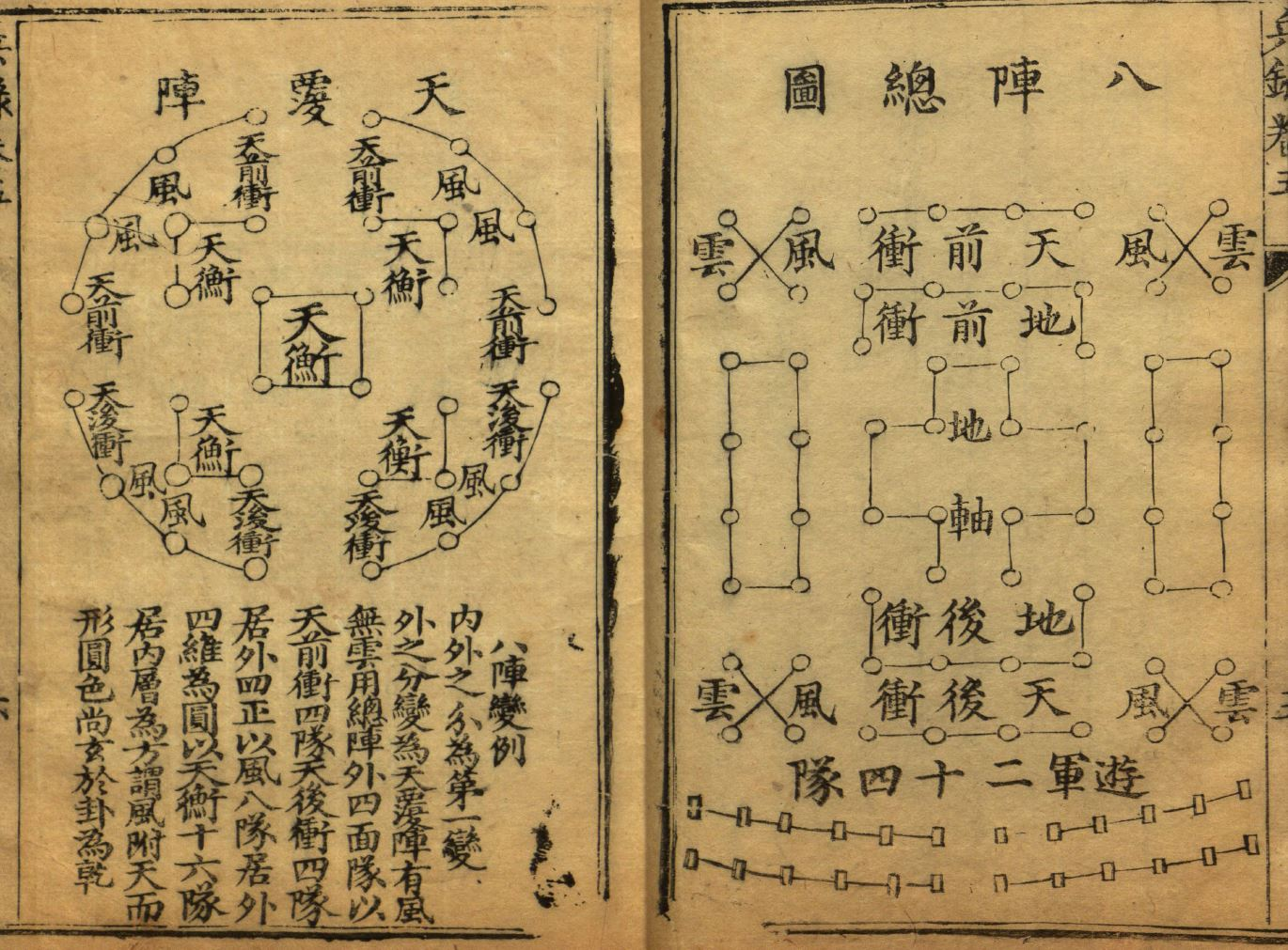
Eight complete formations and sky covering formation

== Imperial guards ==
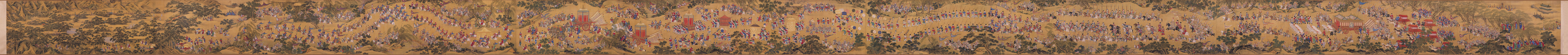
"Departure Herald", 26 m (85 ft) in length, from the Jiajing reign period (1522-1566 AD); the painting shows the emperor's large procession heading towards the imperial tombs of the Ming emperors located roughly 50 km north of the capital Beijing. This painting is usually paired with another panoramic painting called "Return Clearing", 31 m (98 ft) in length, which shows the emperor returning to the capital from the tombs by river boat.
"Return Clearing", the companion scroll of the "Departure Herald"

== Flags and banners ==
=== Jixiao Xinshu ===
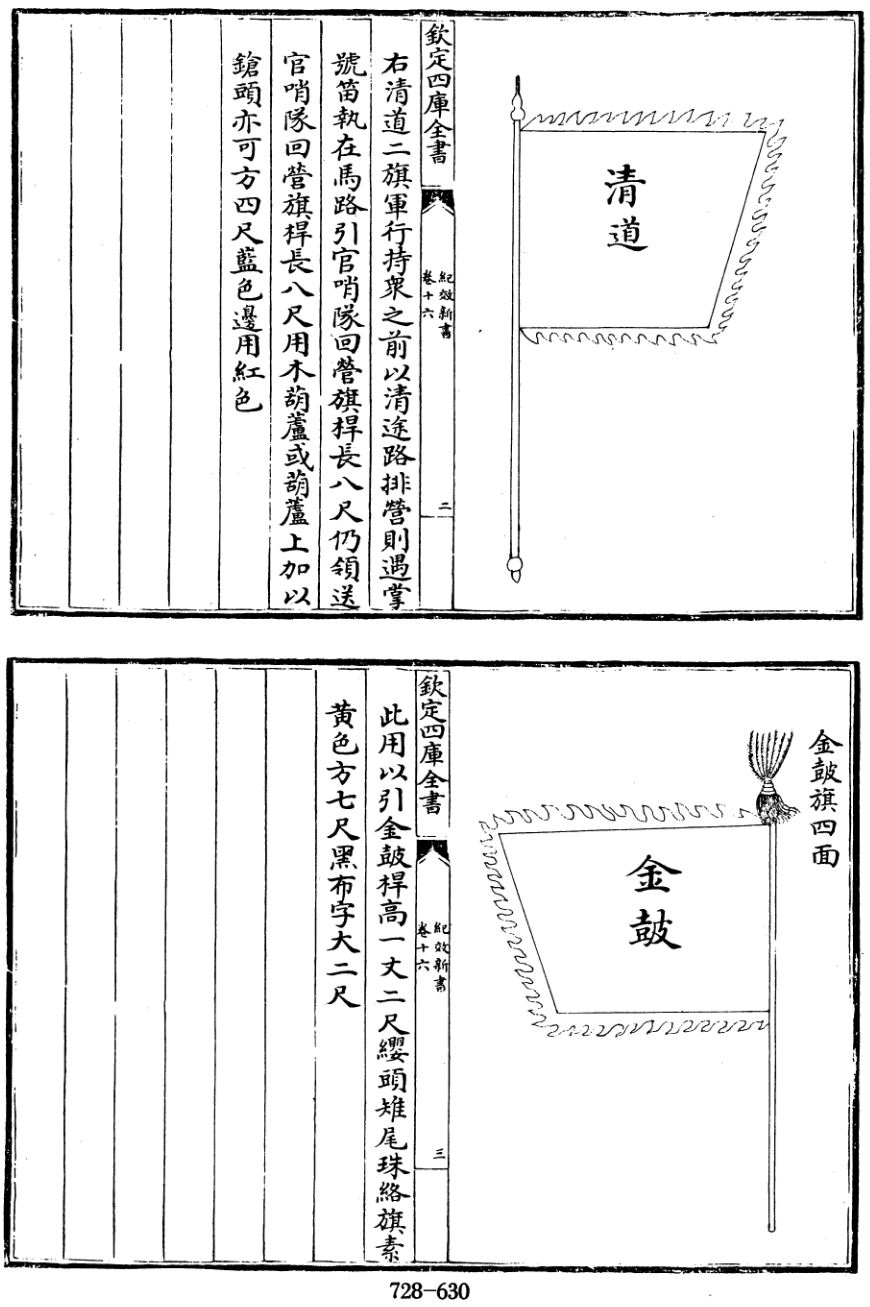

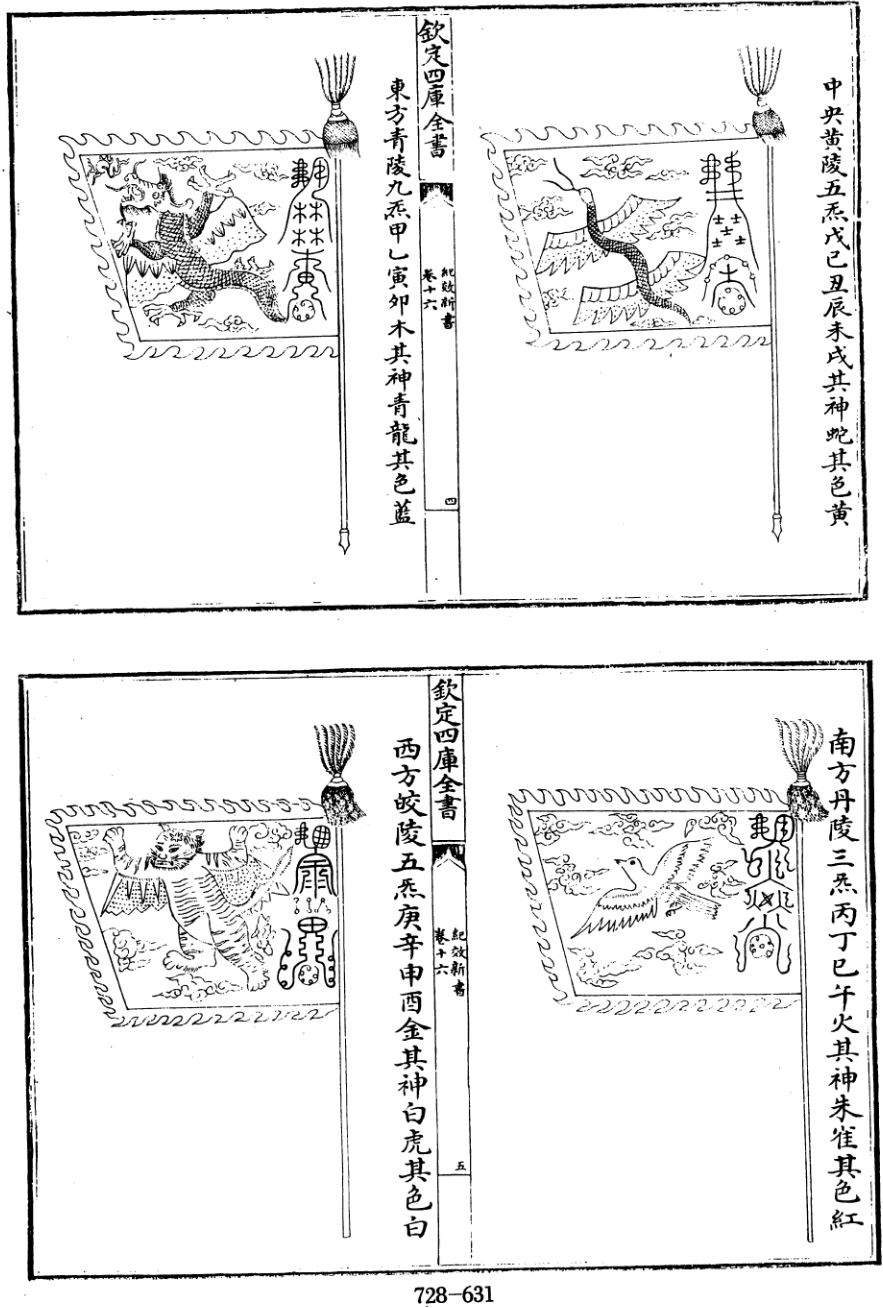

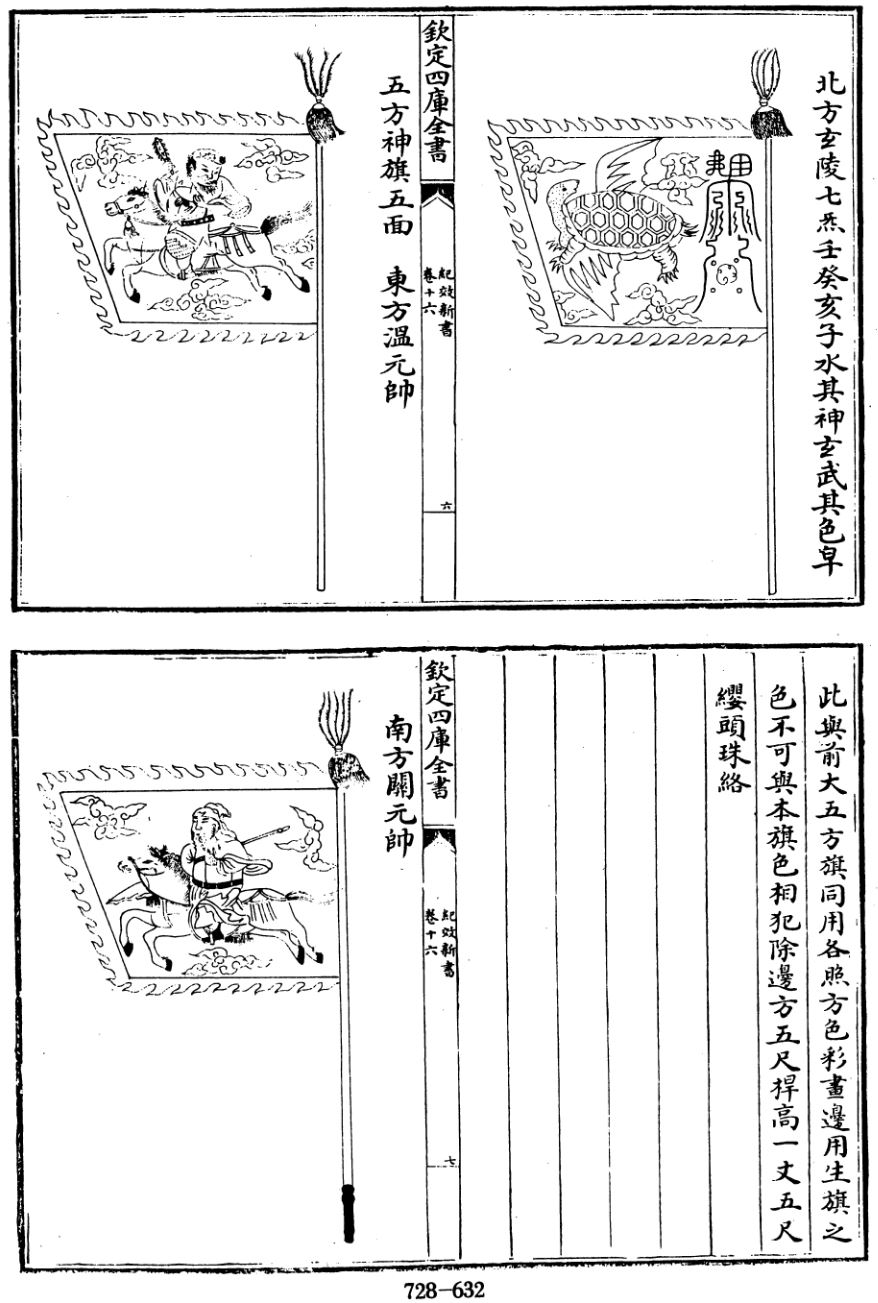

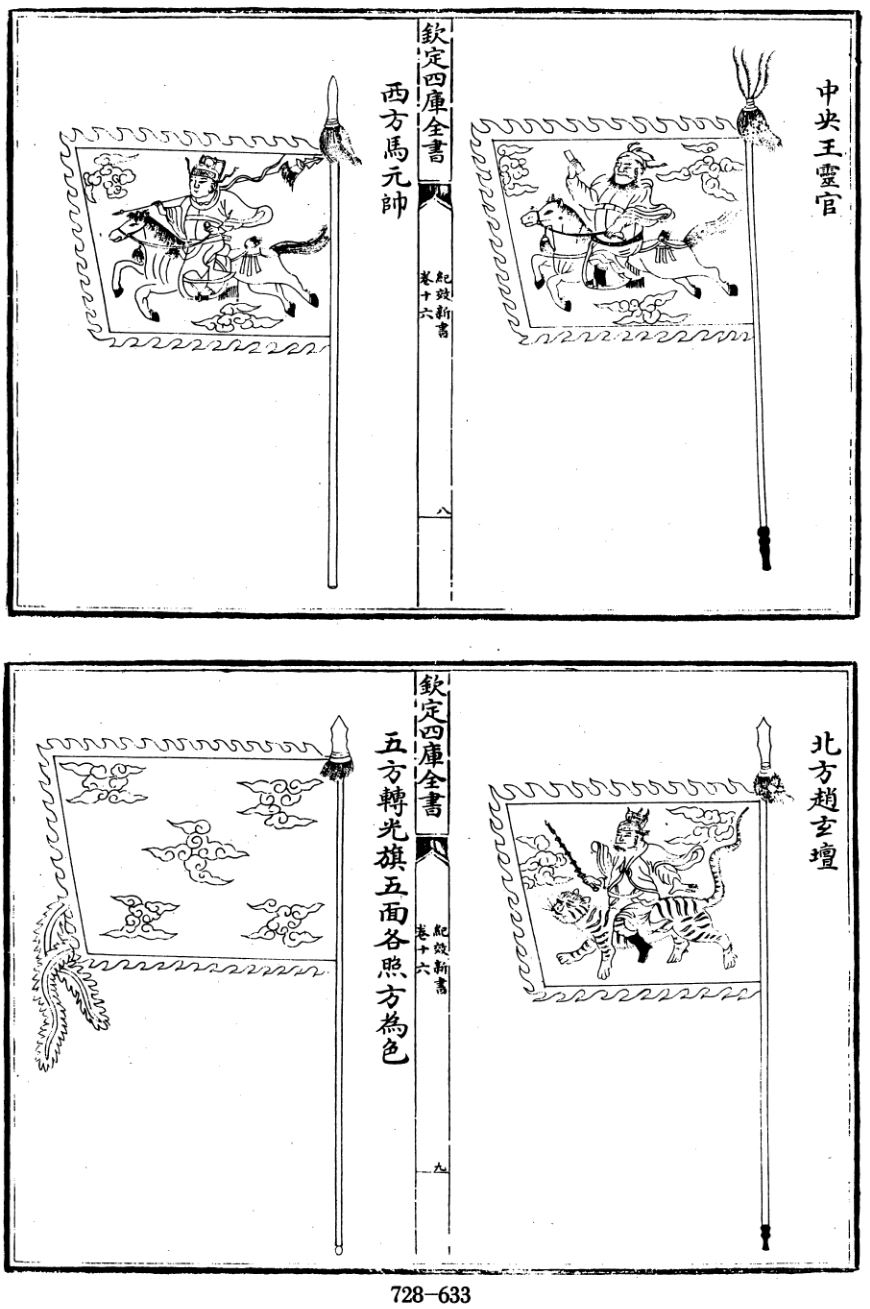

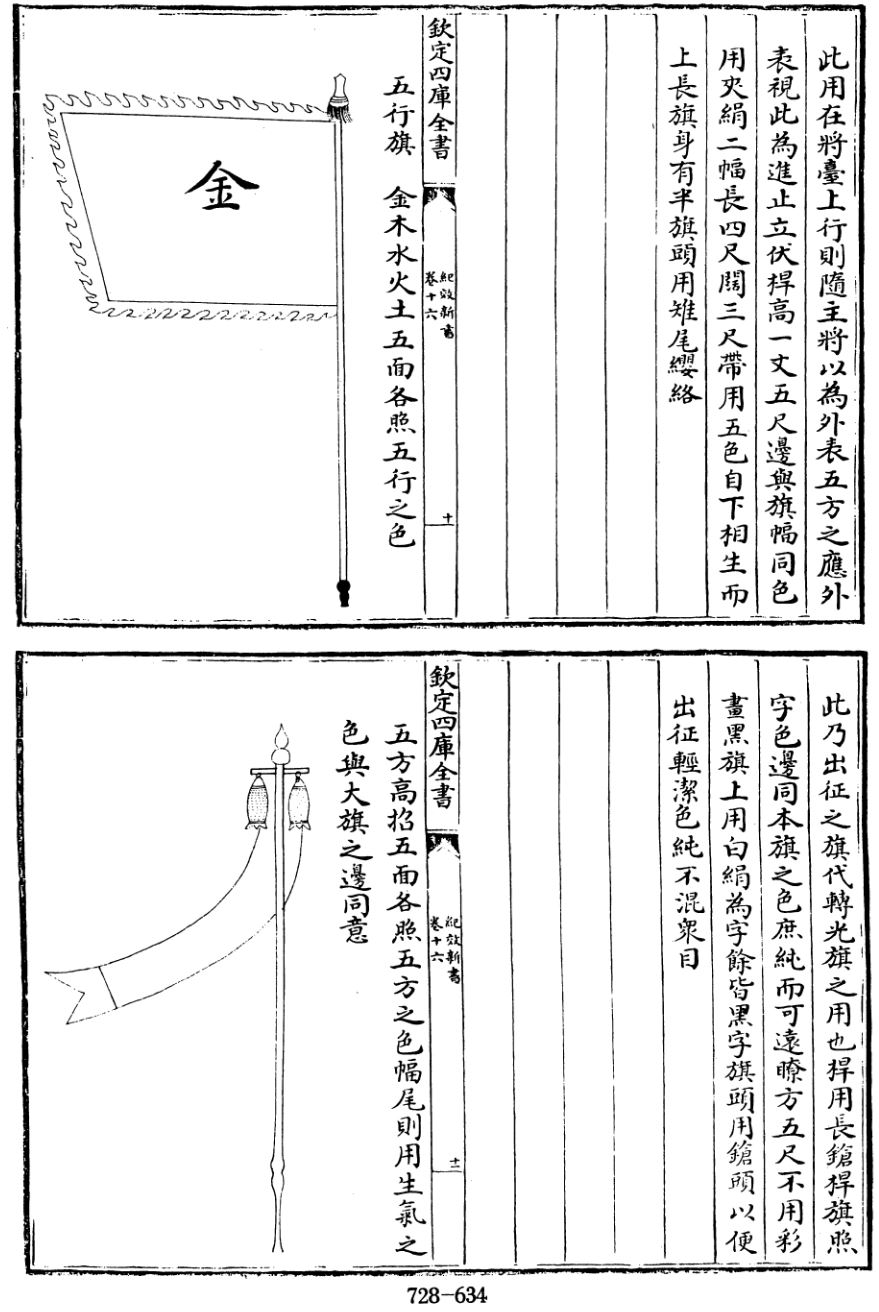

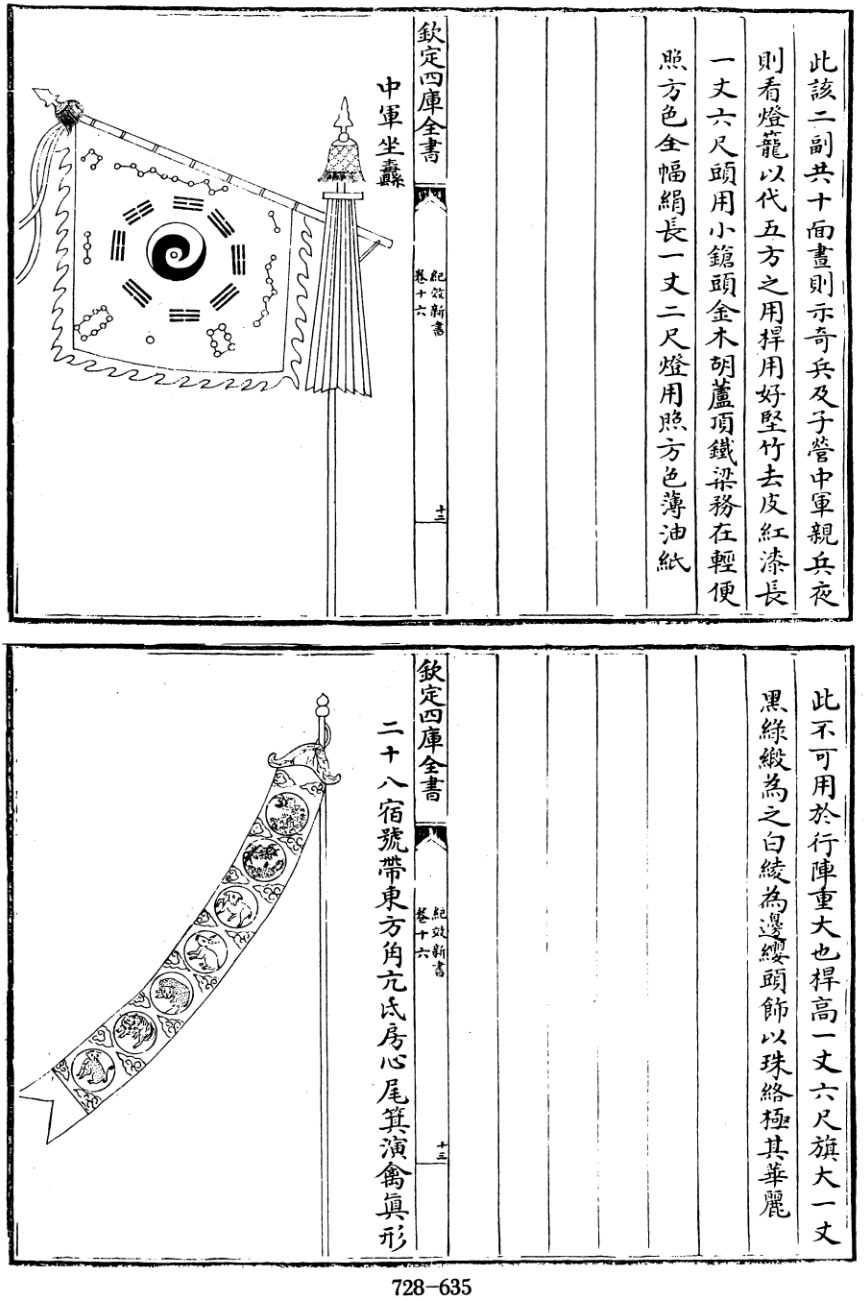

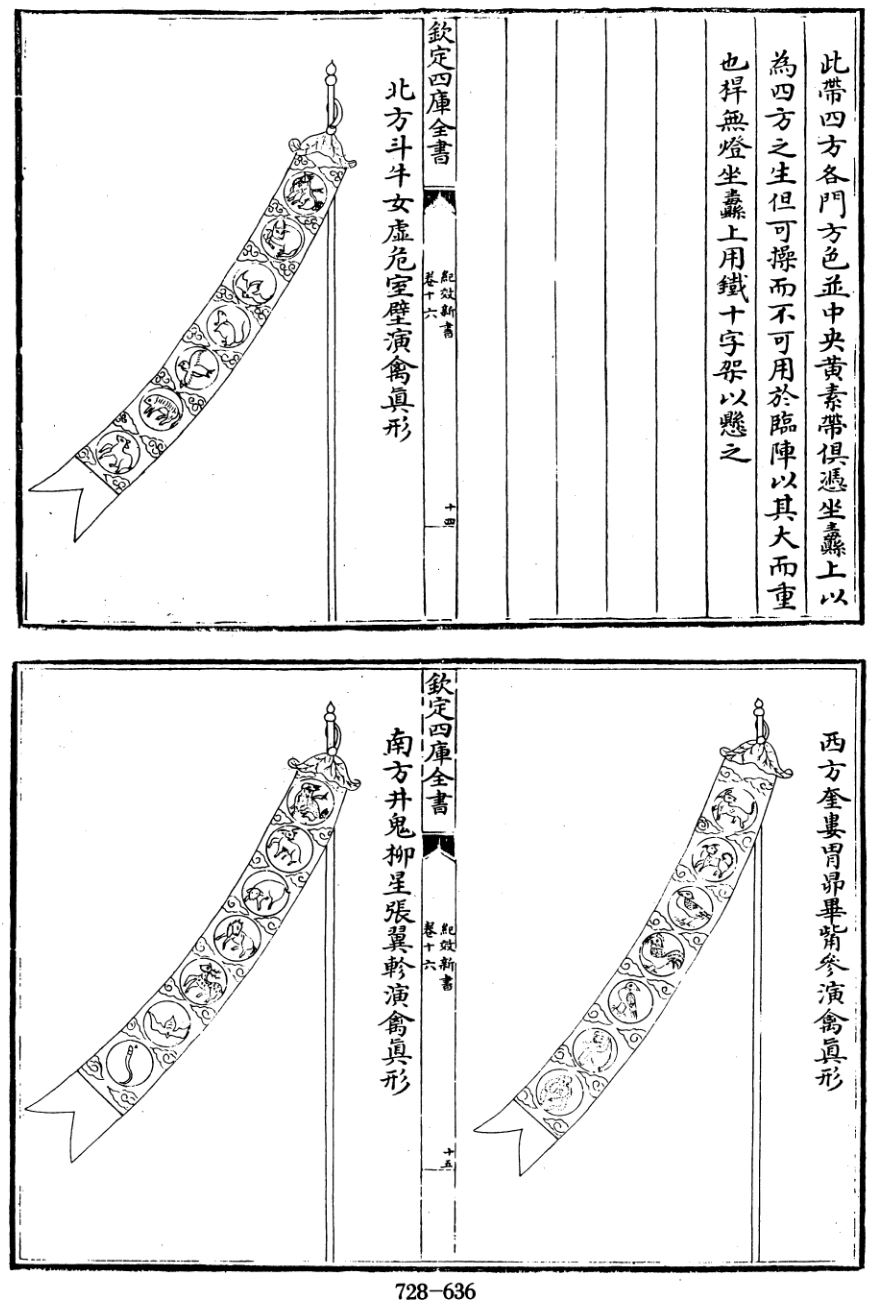

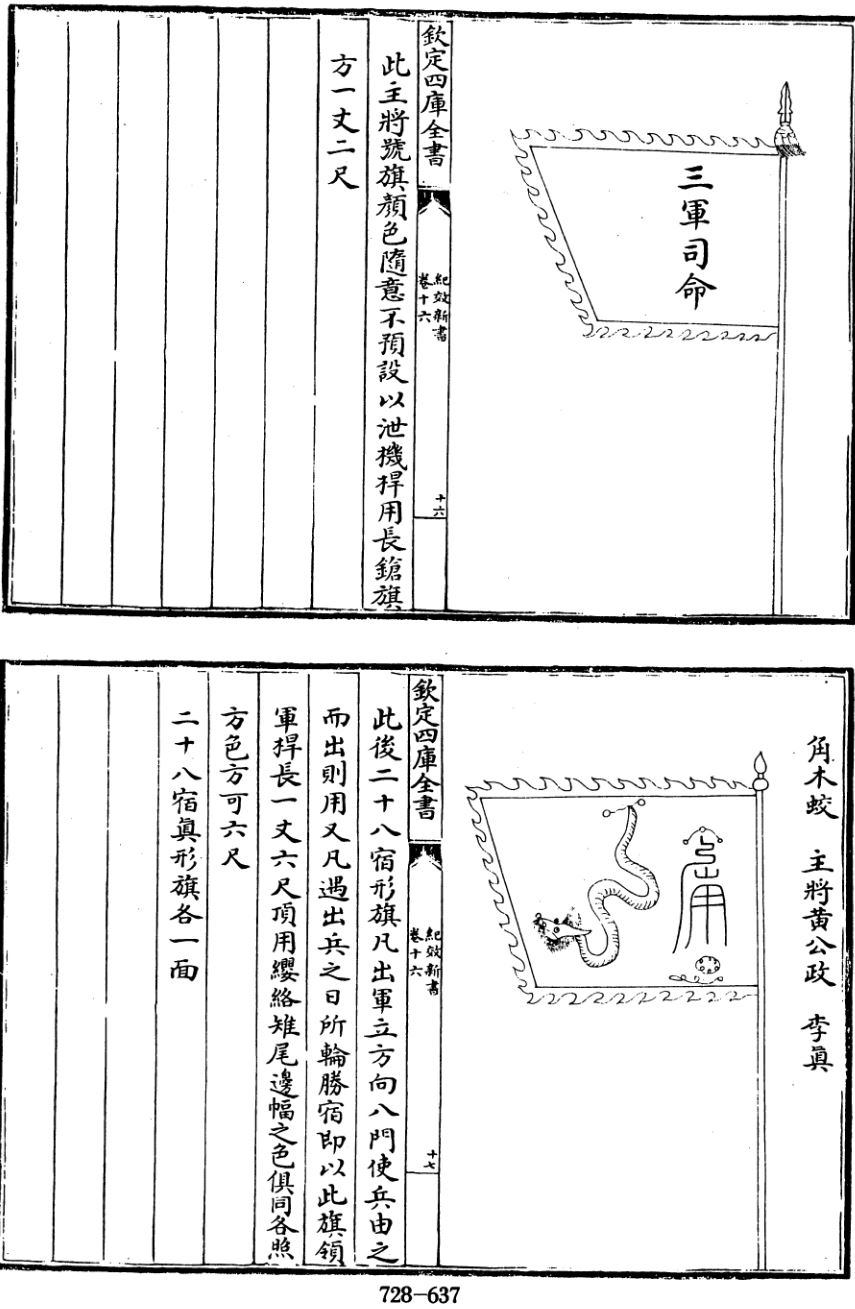

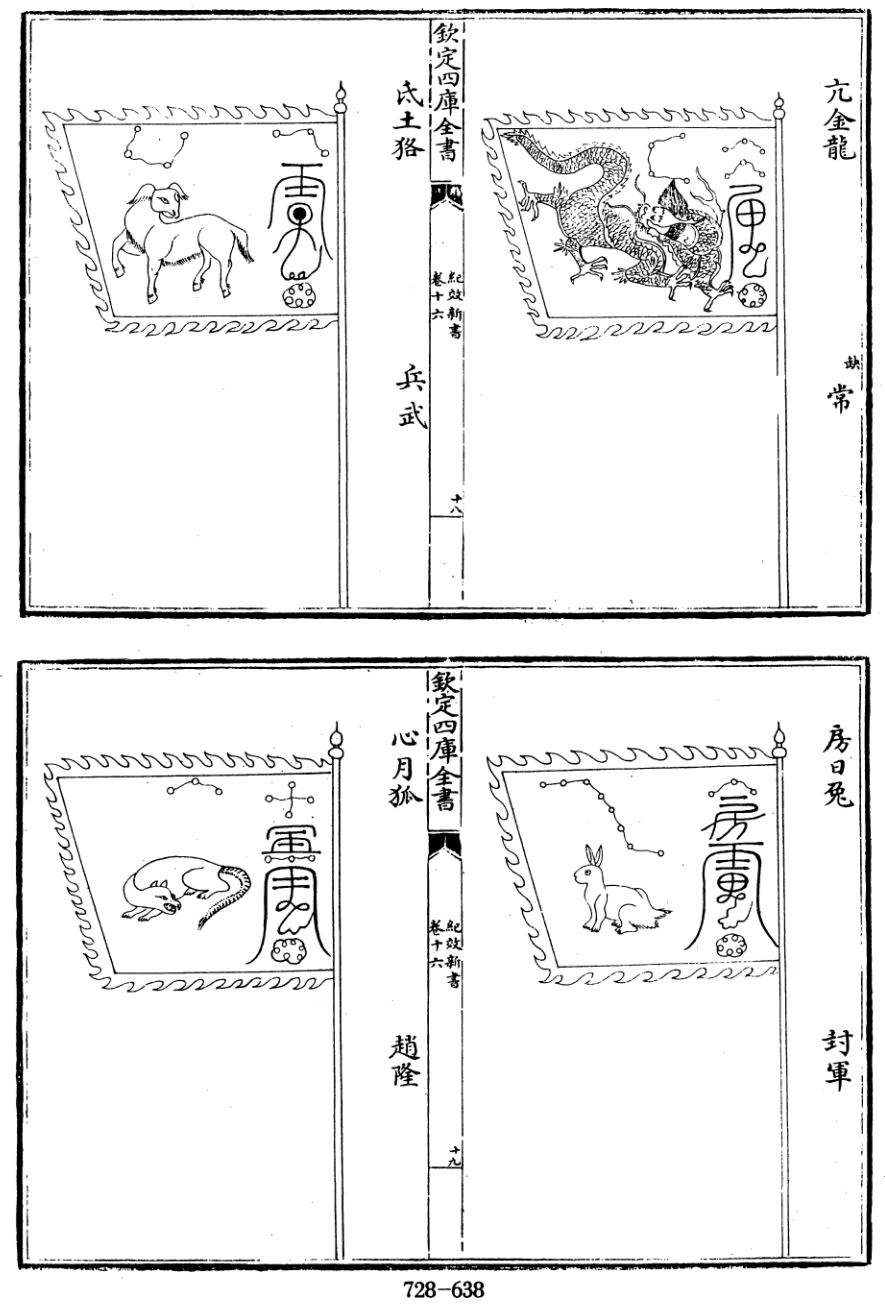

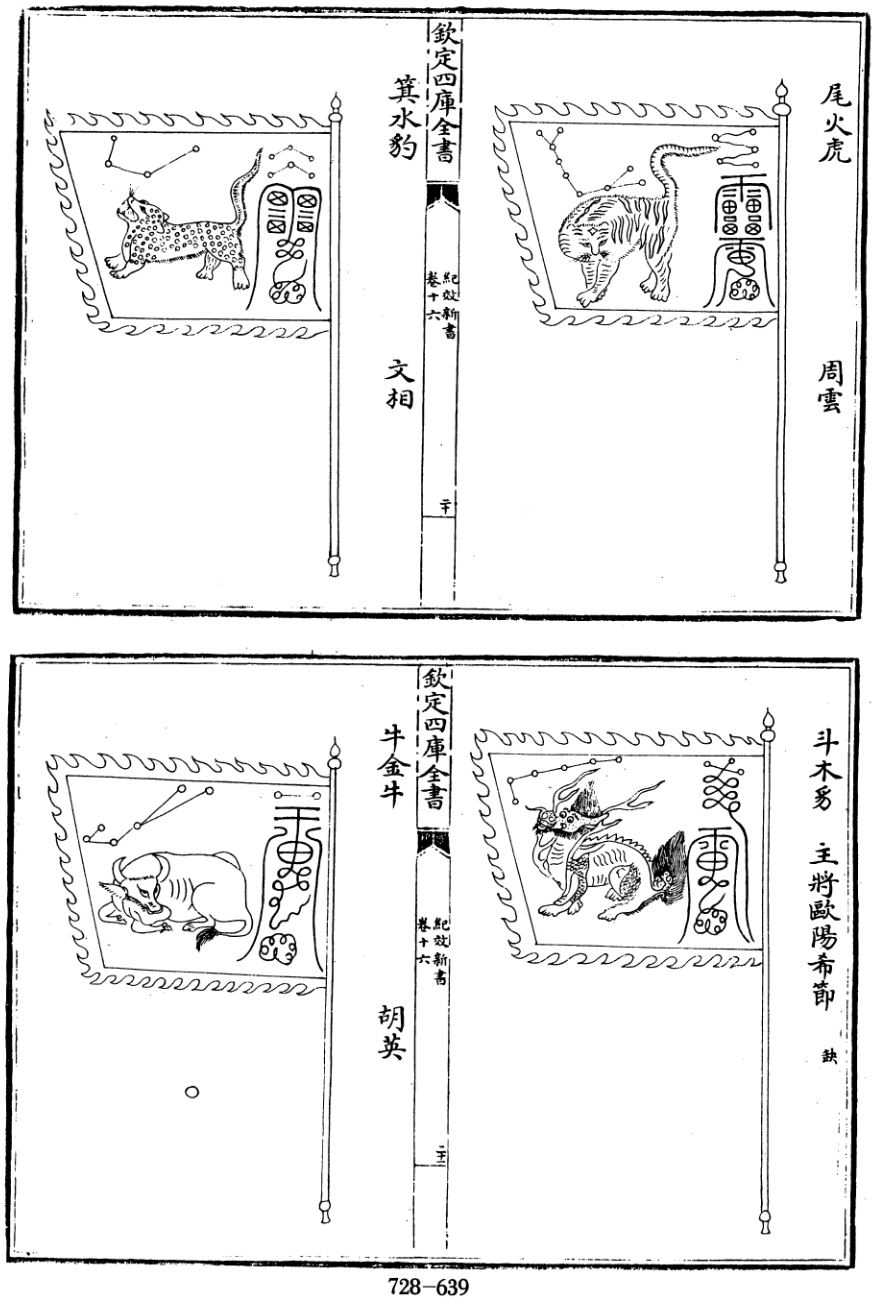

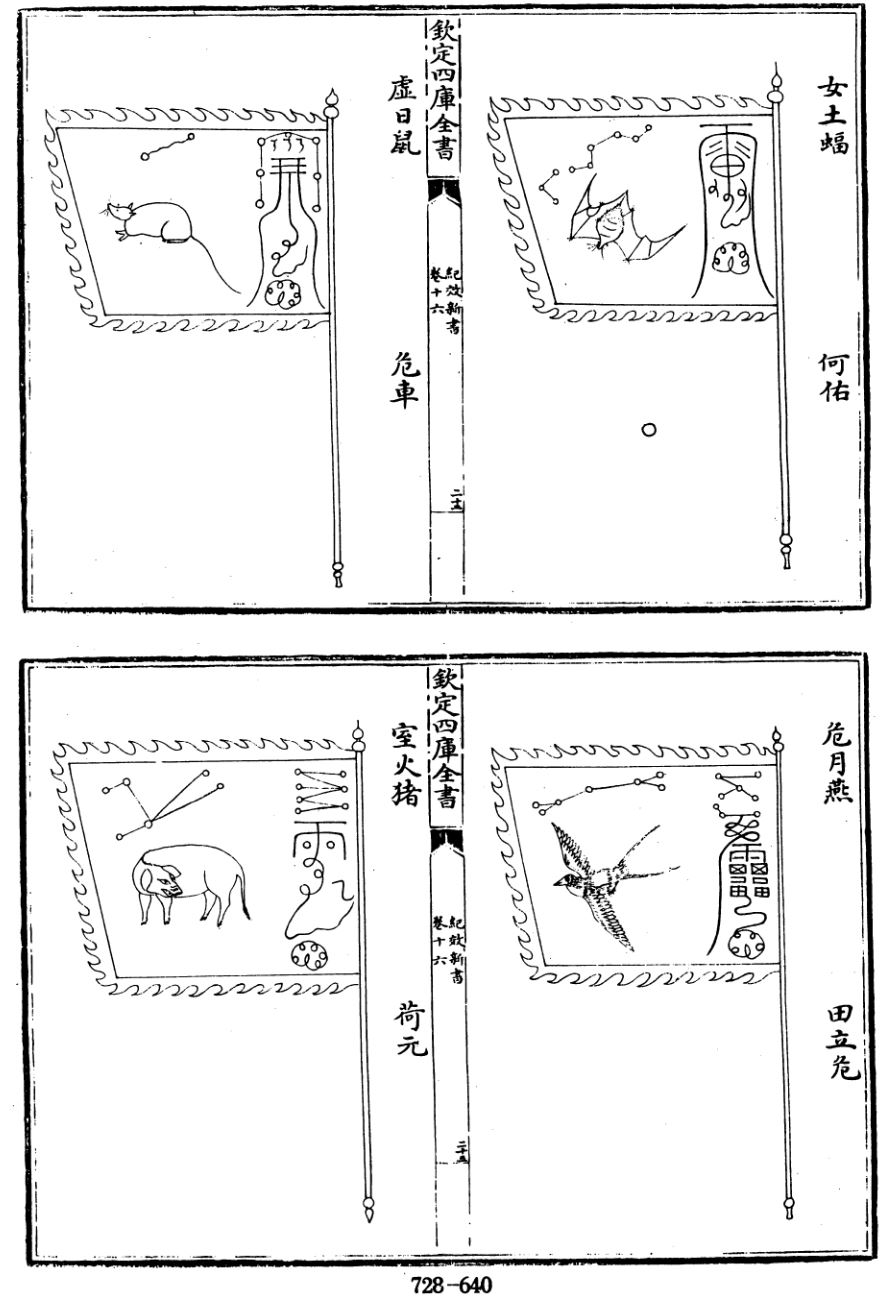

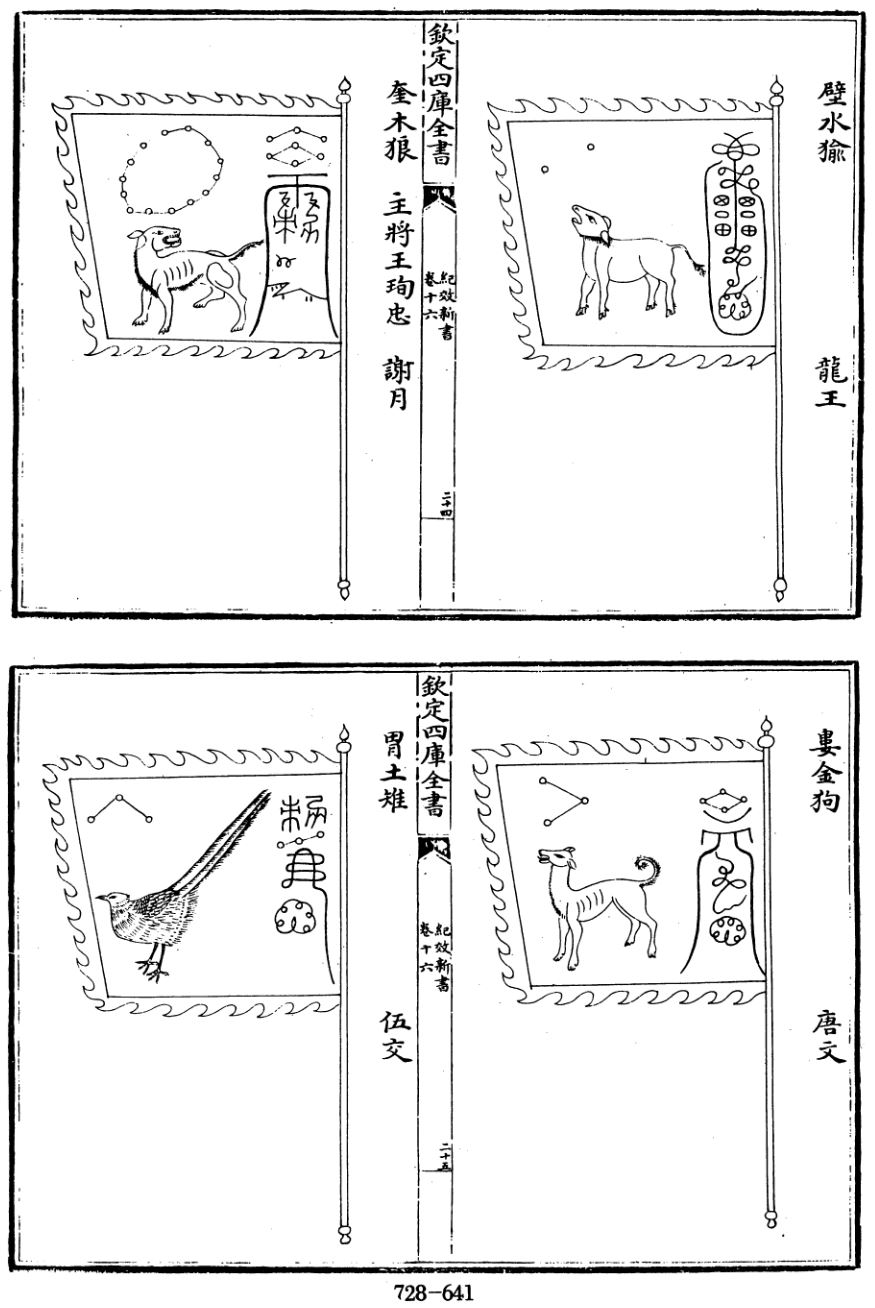

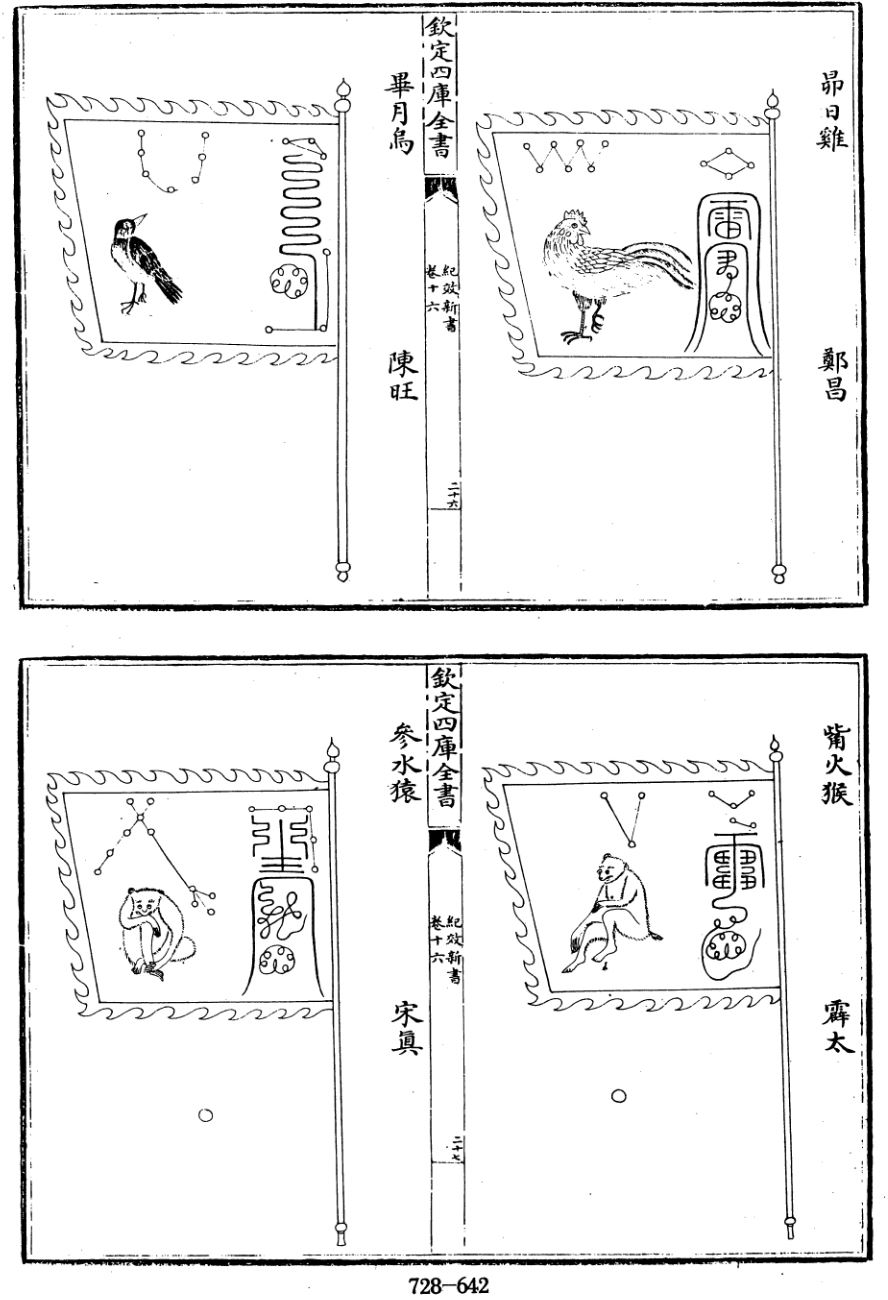

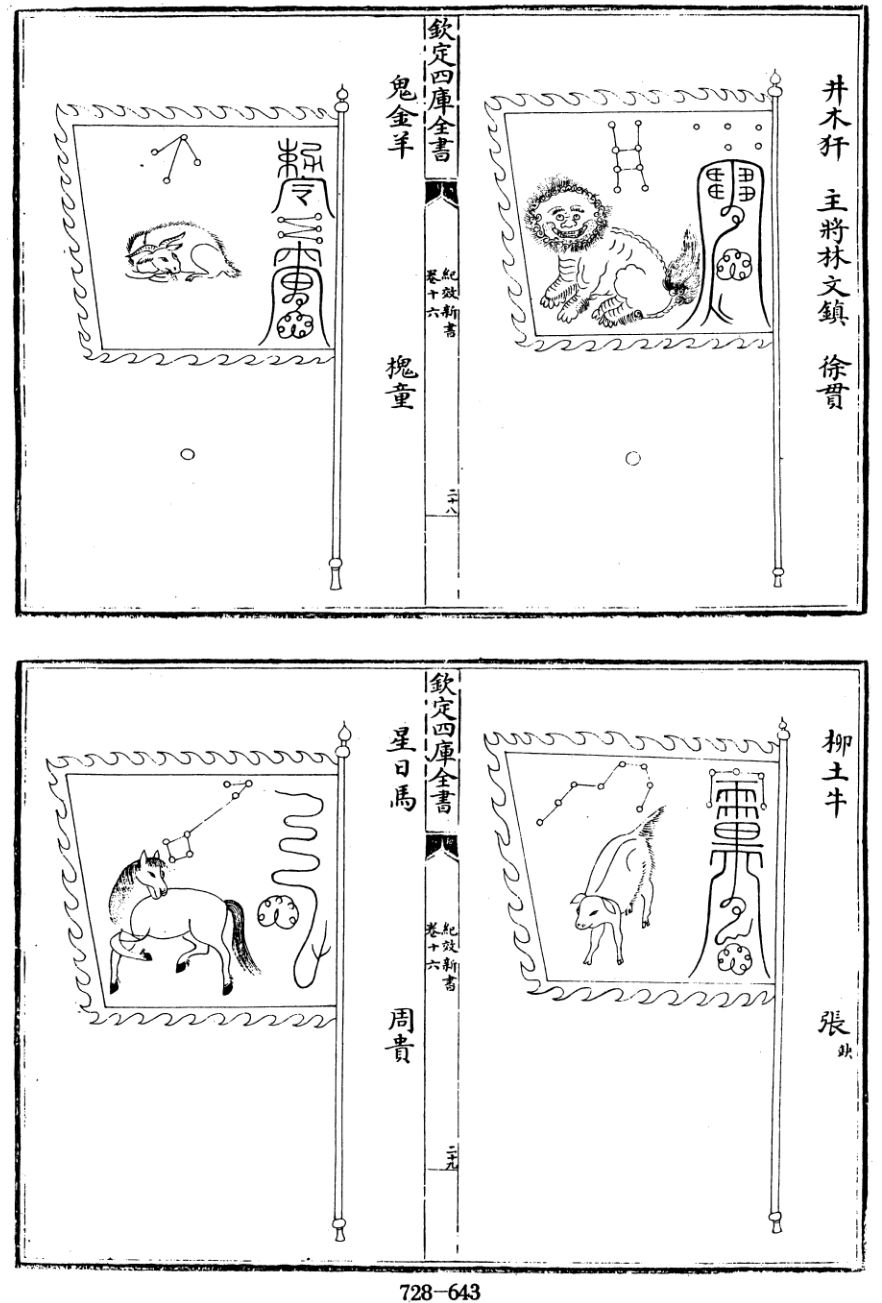

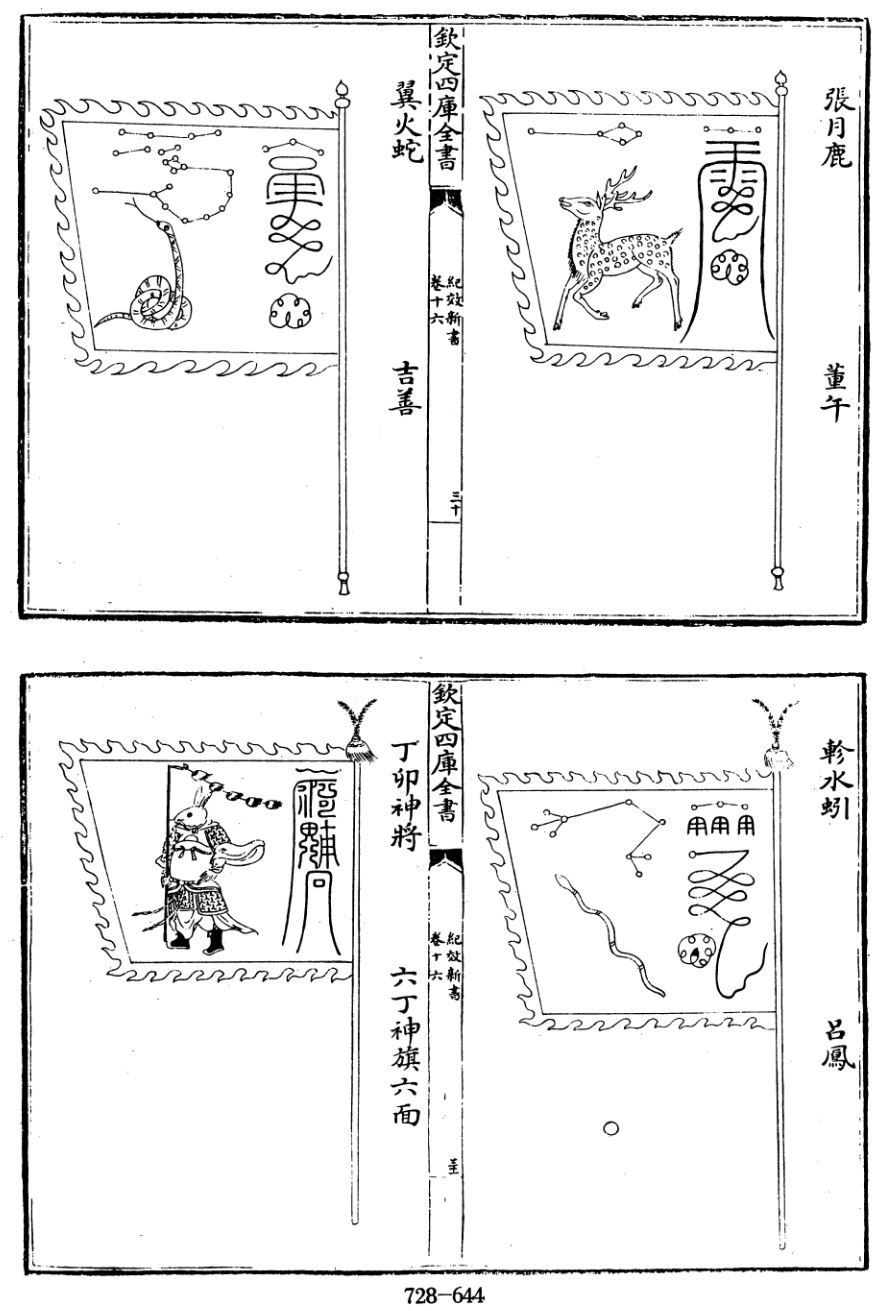

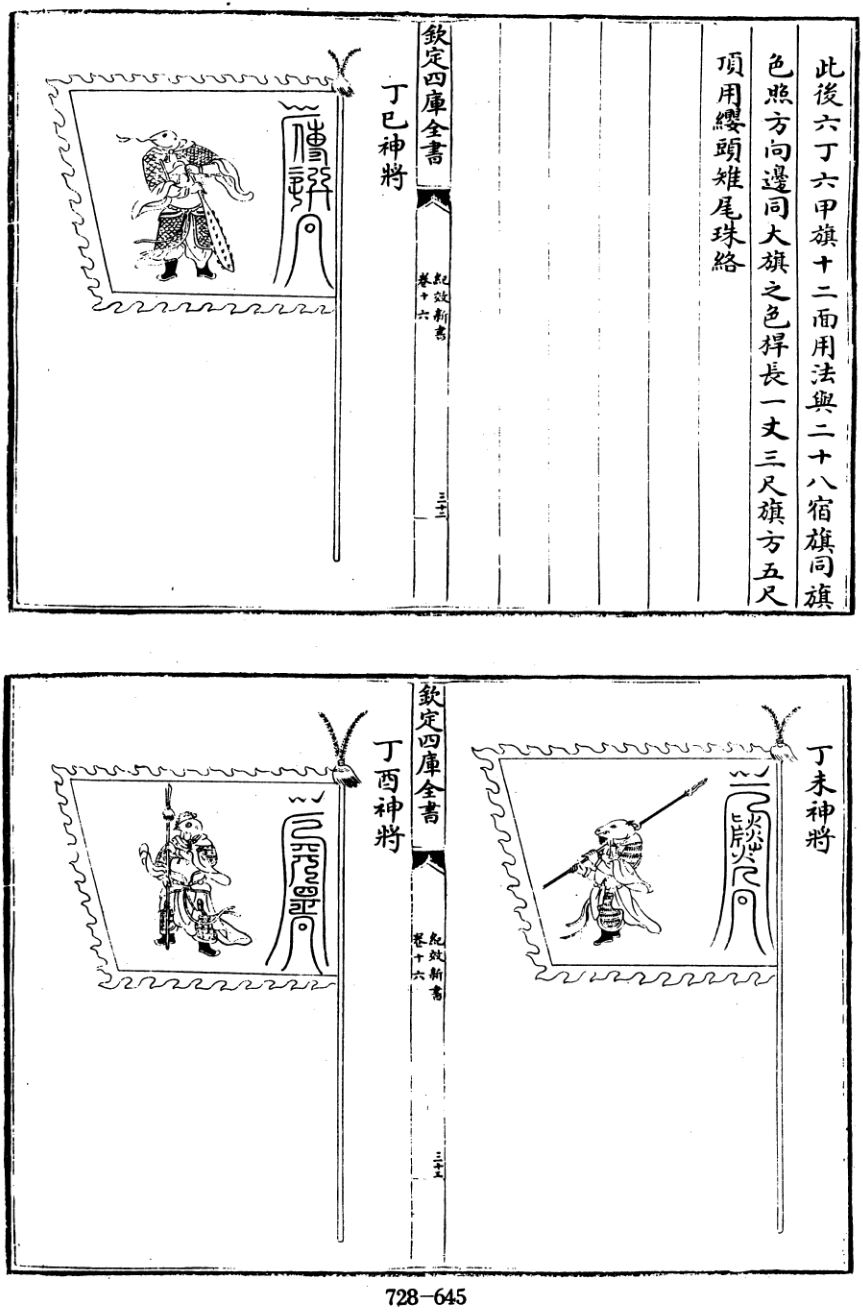

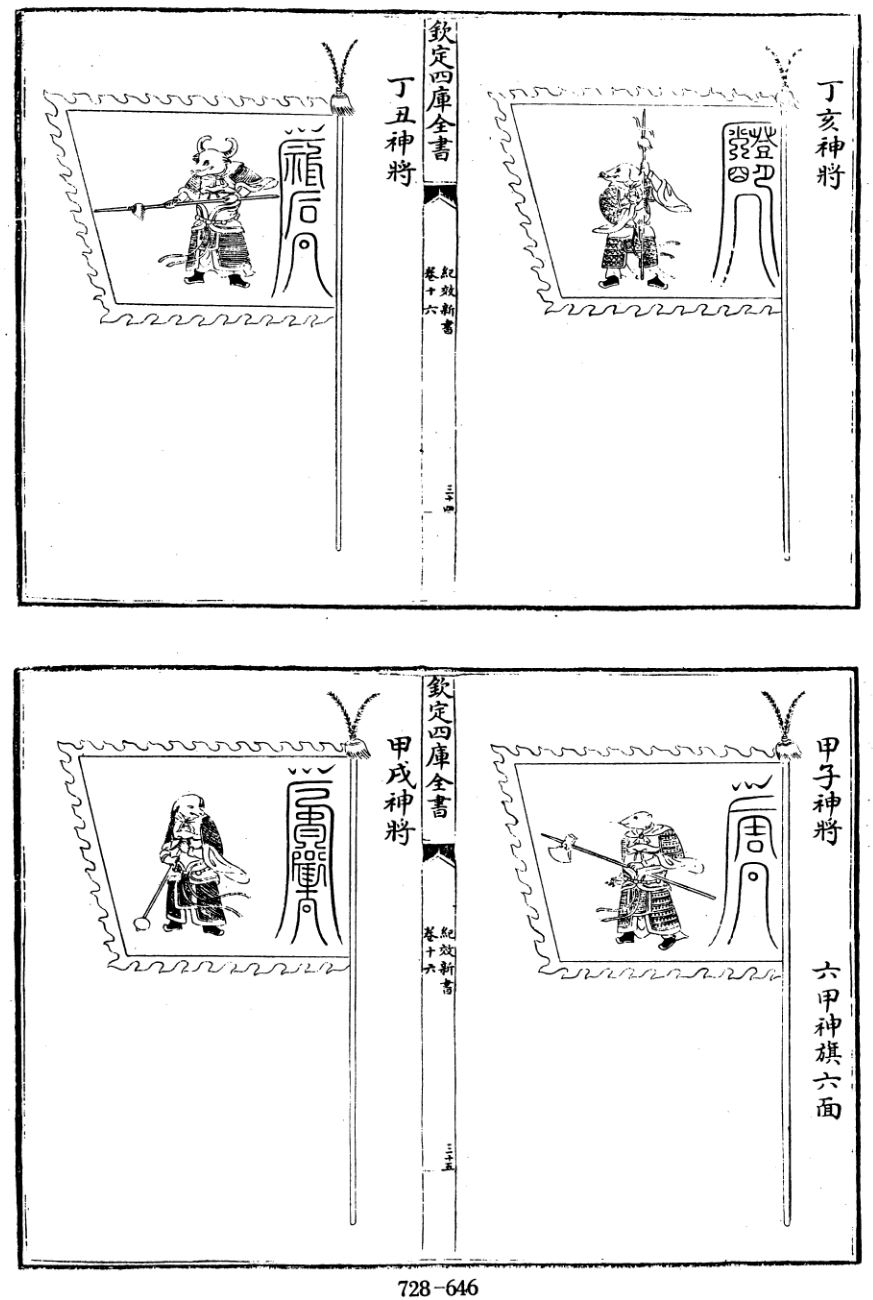

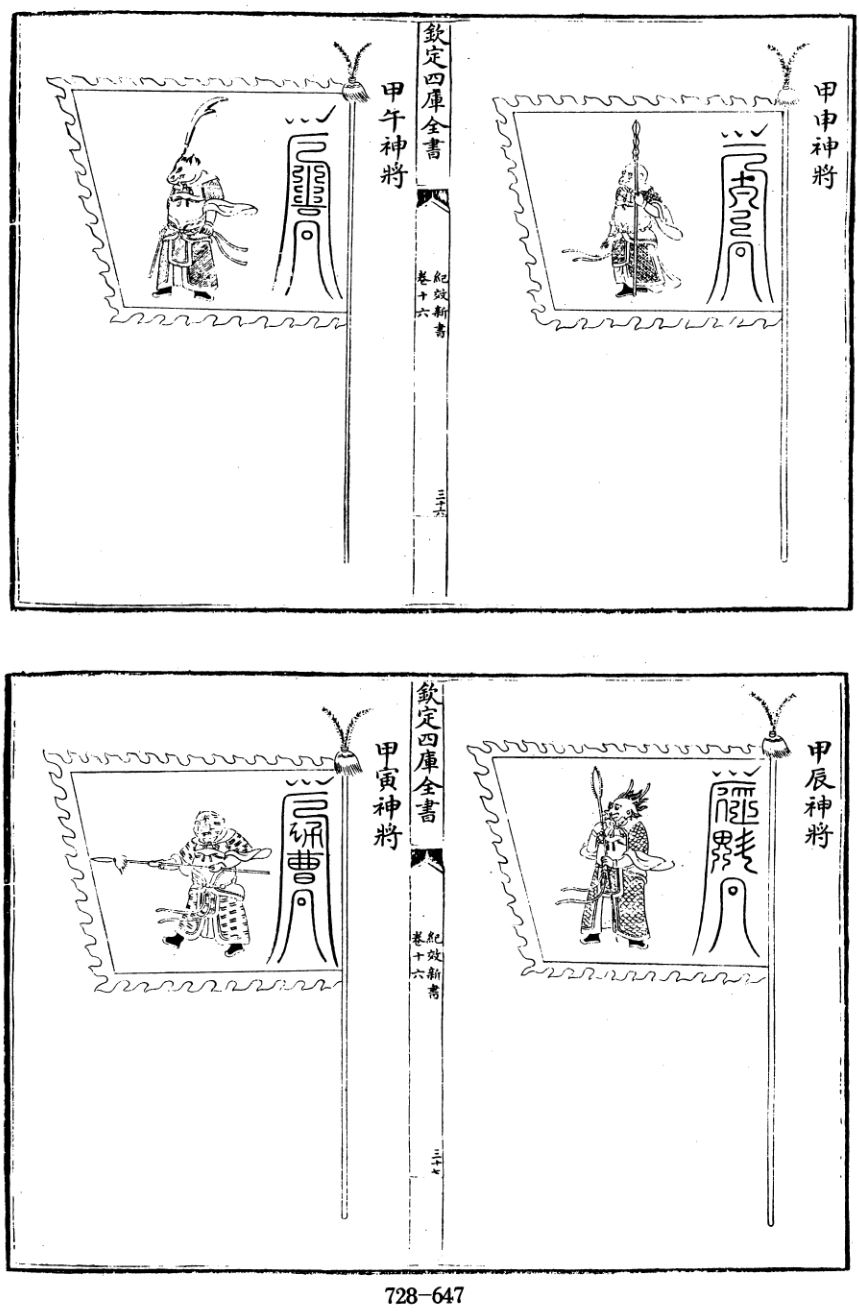

=== Wubei Zhi ===
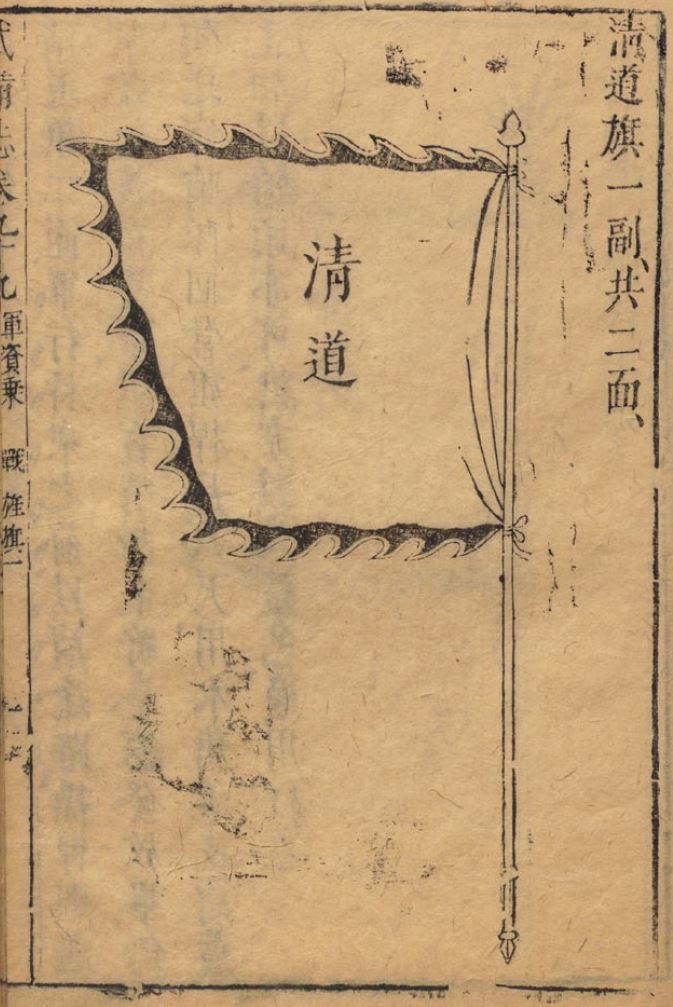

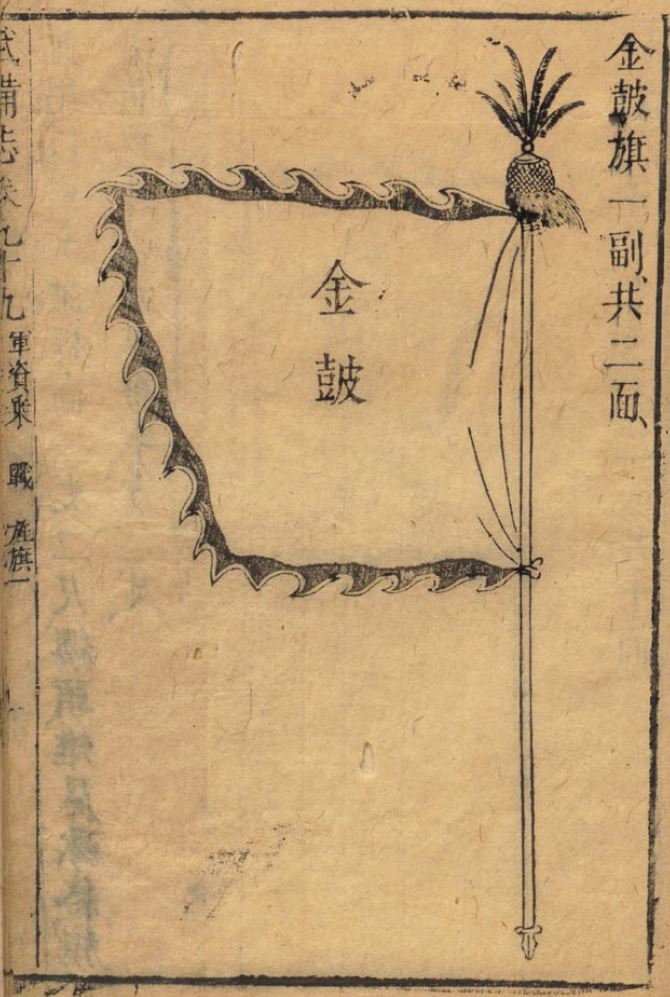

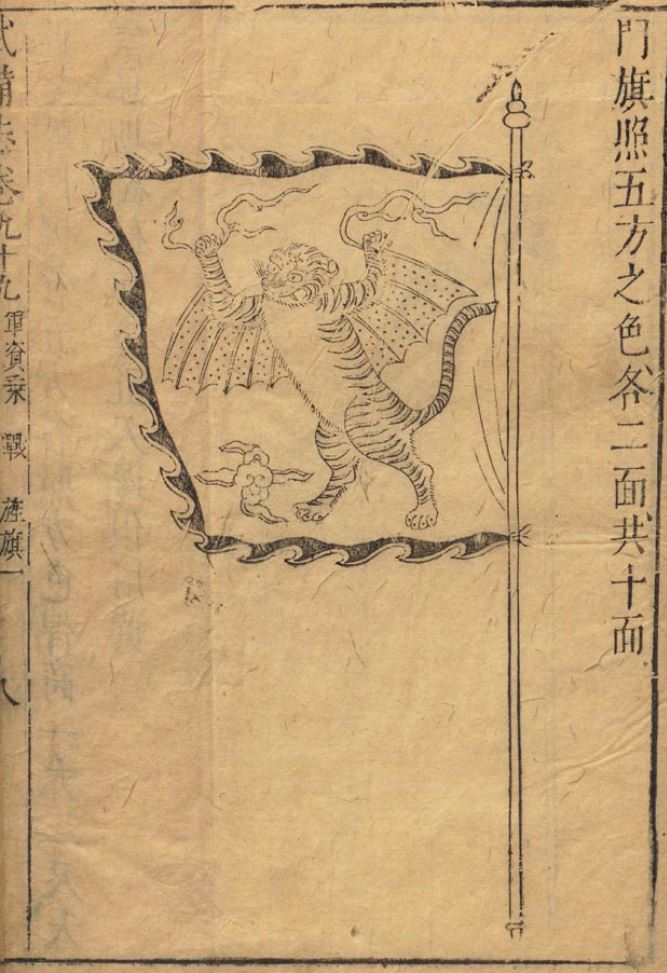

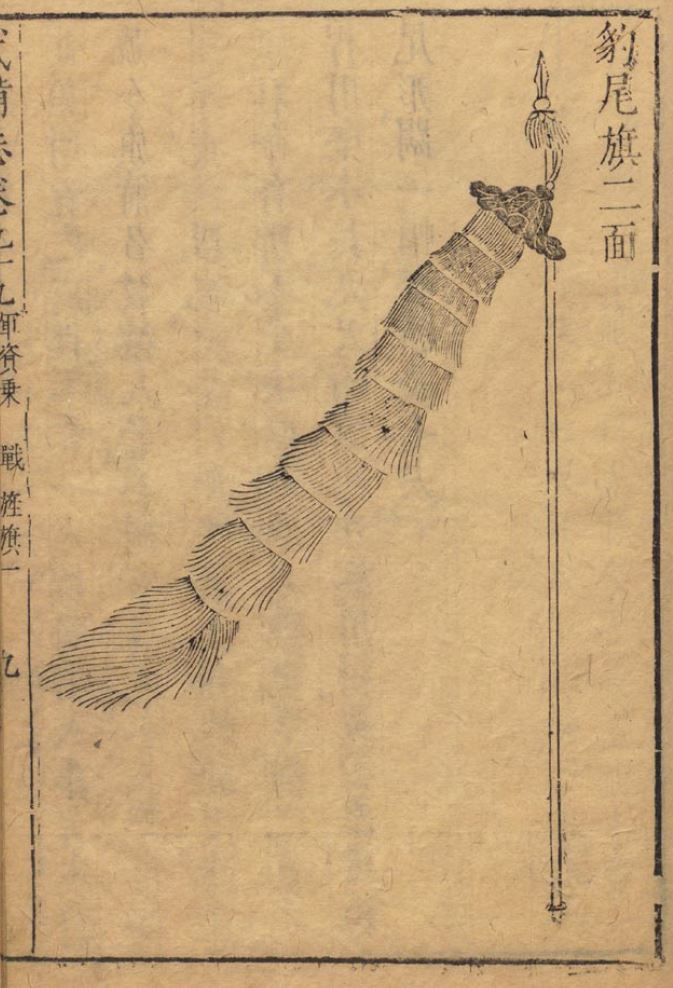

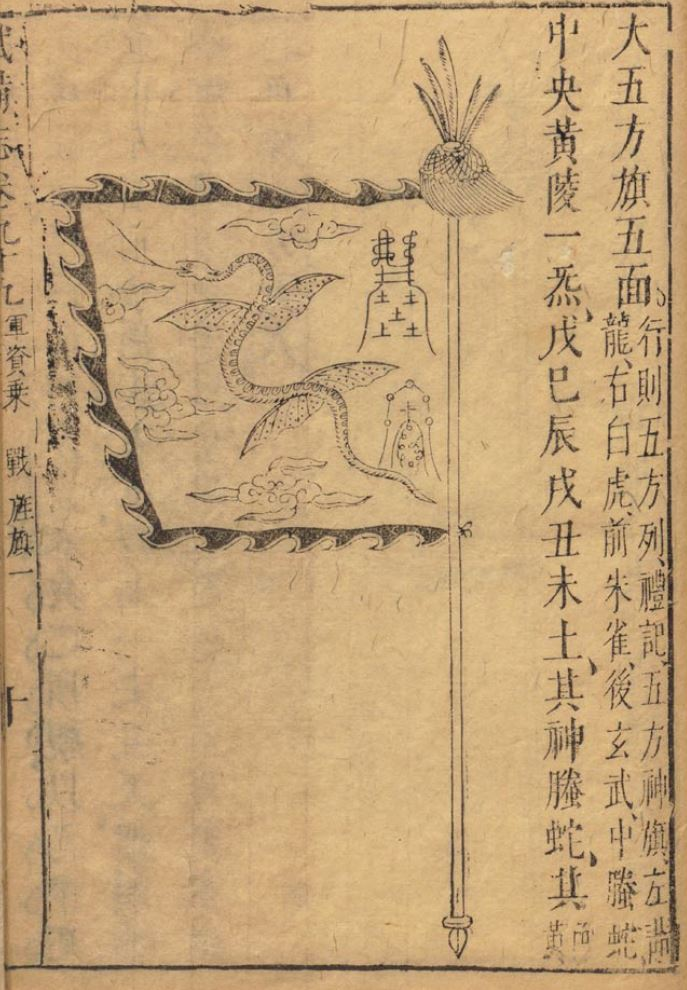

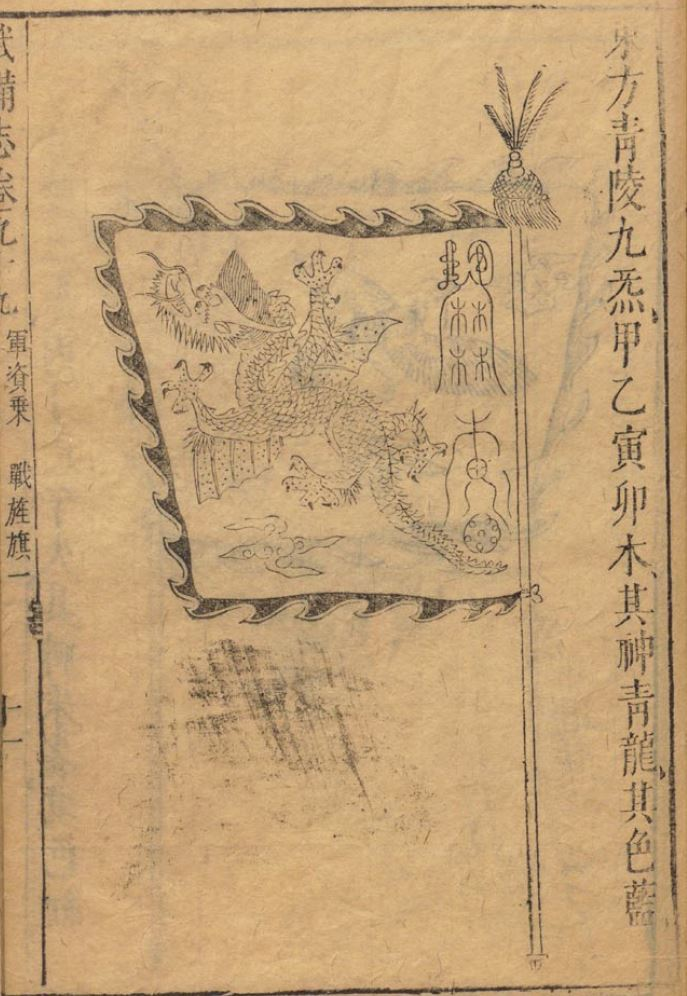

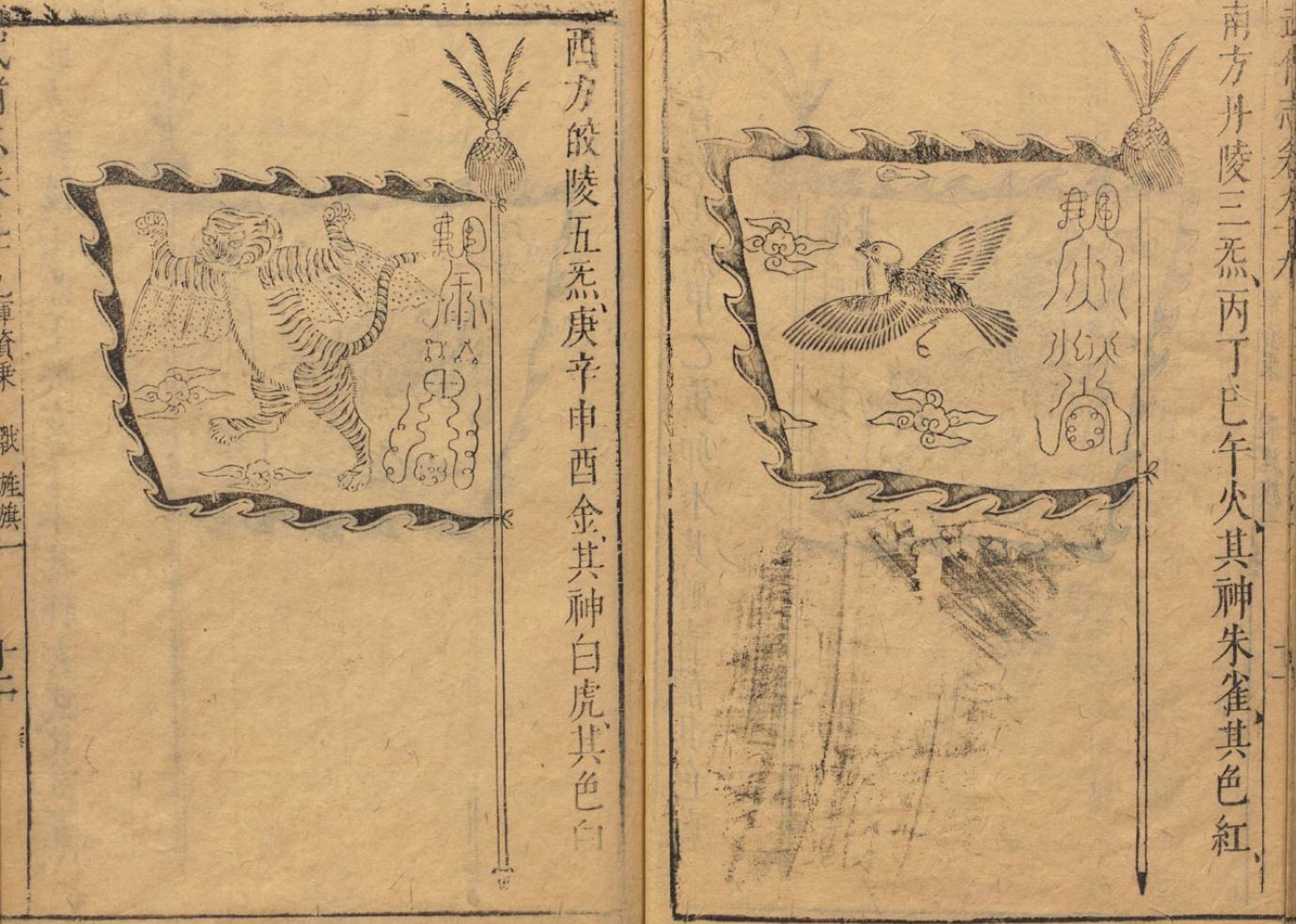

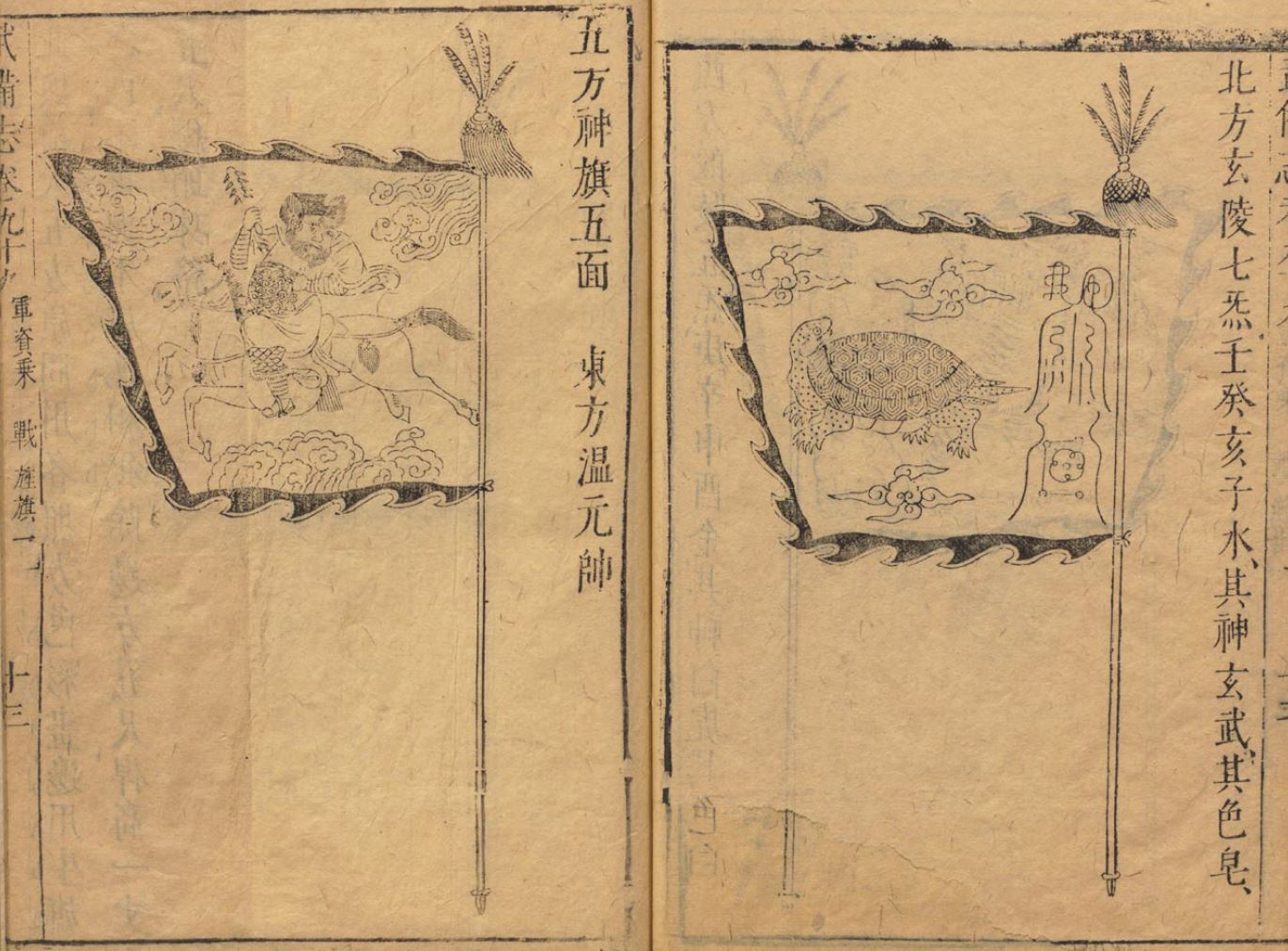

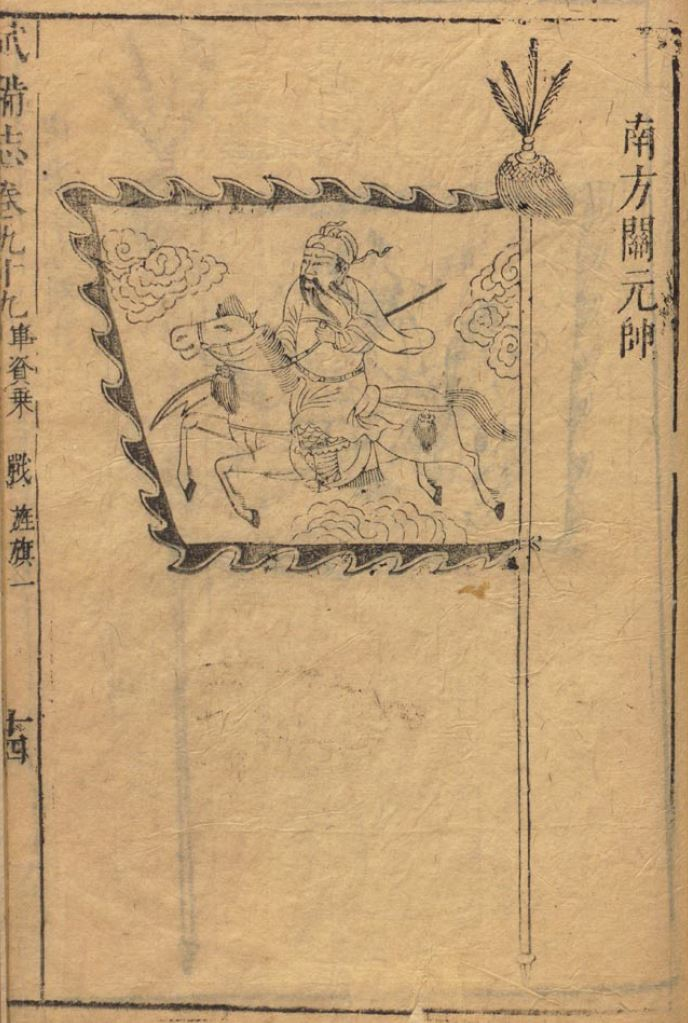

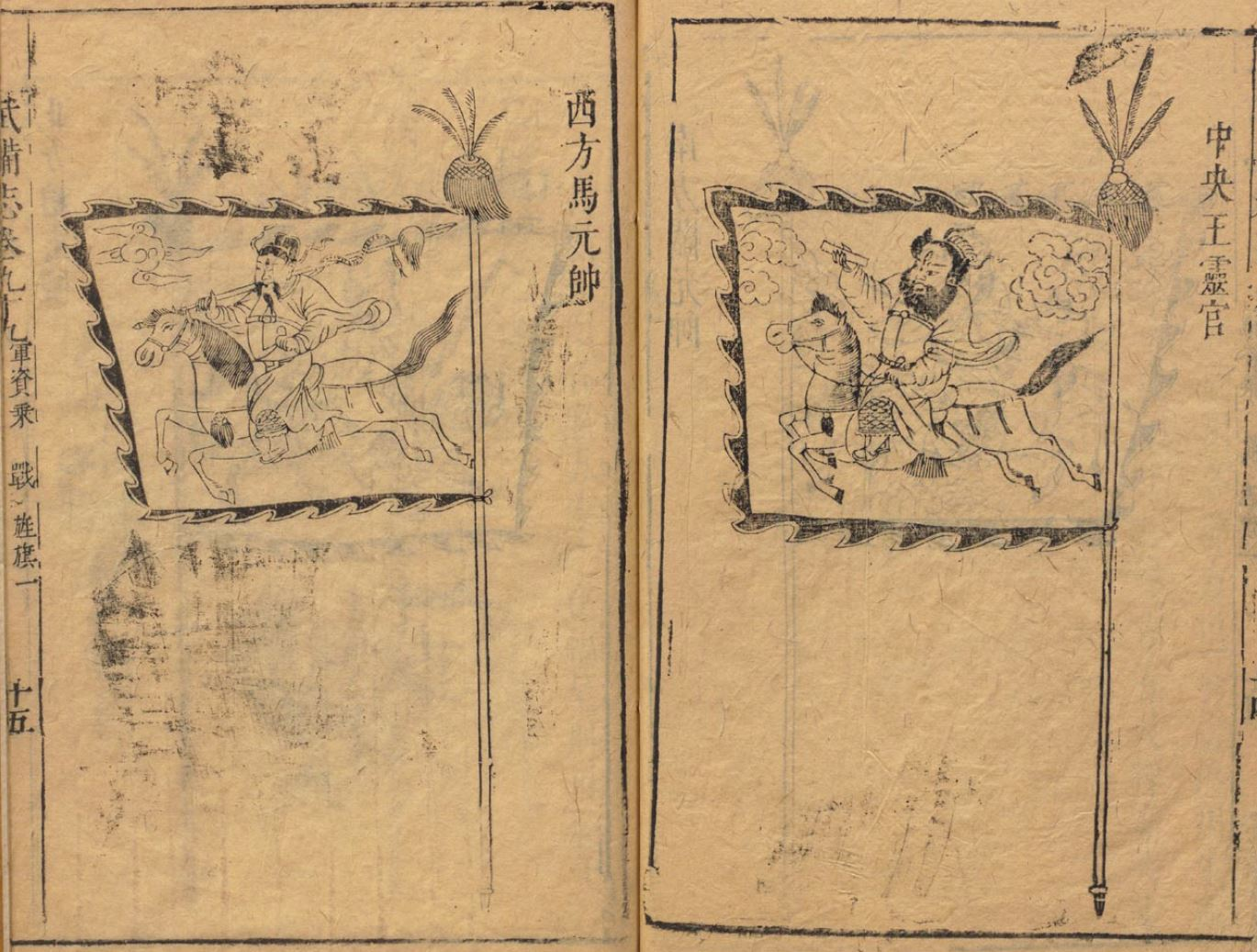

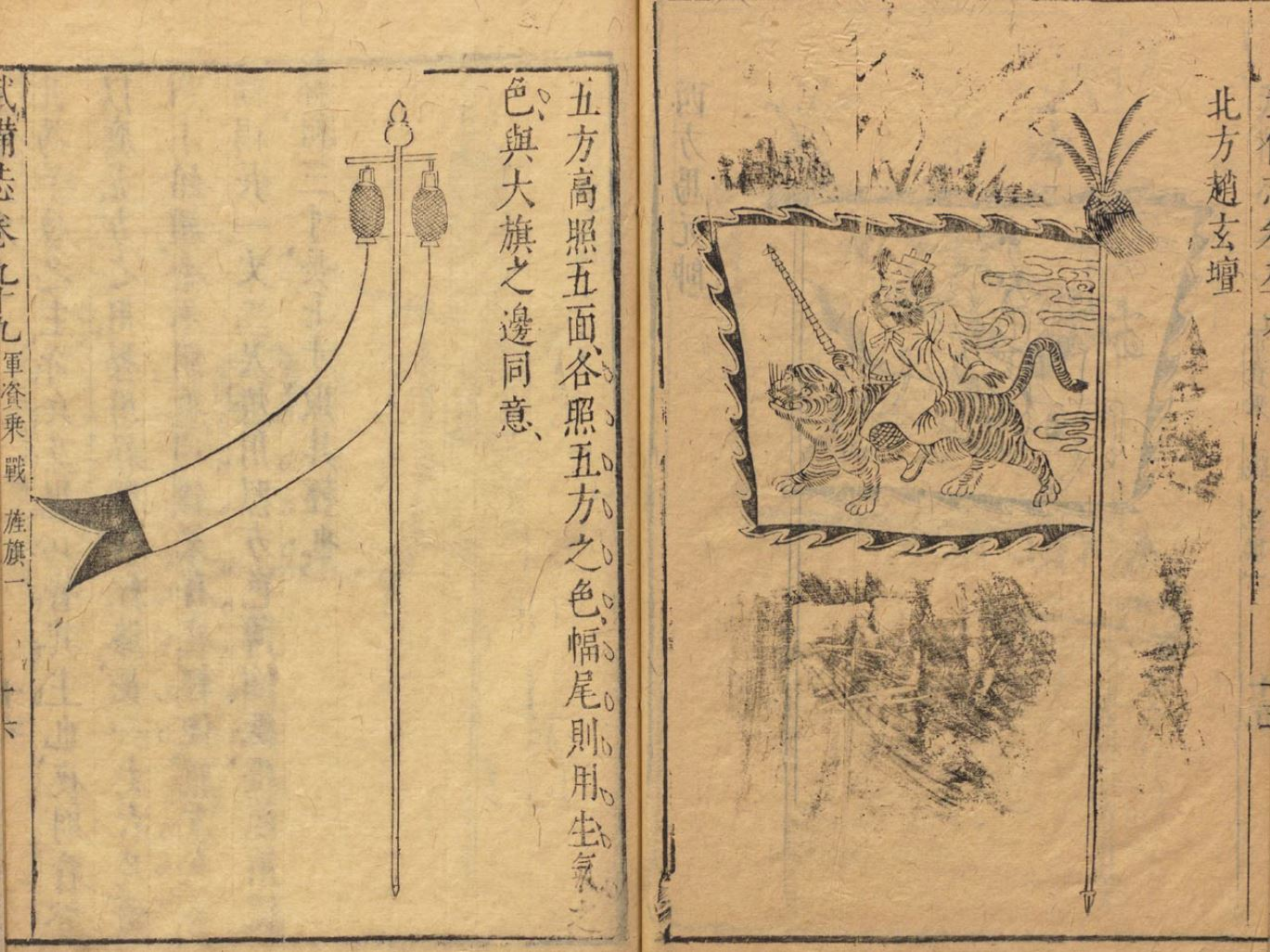

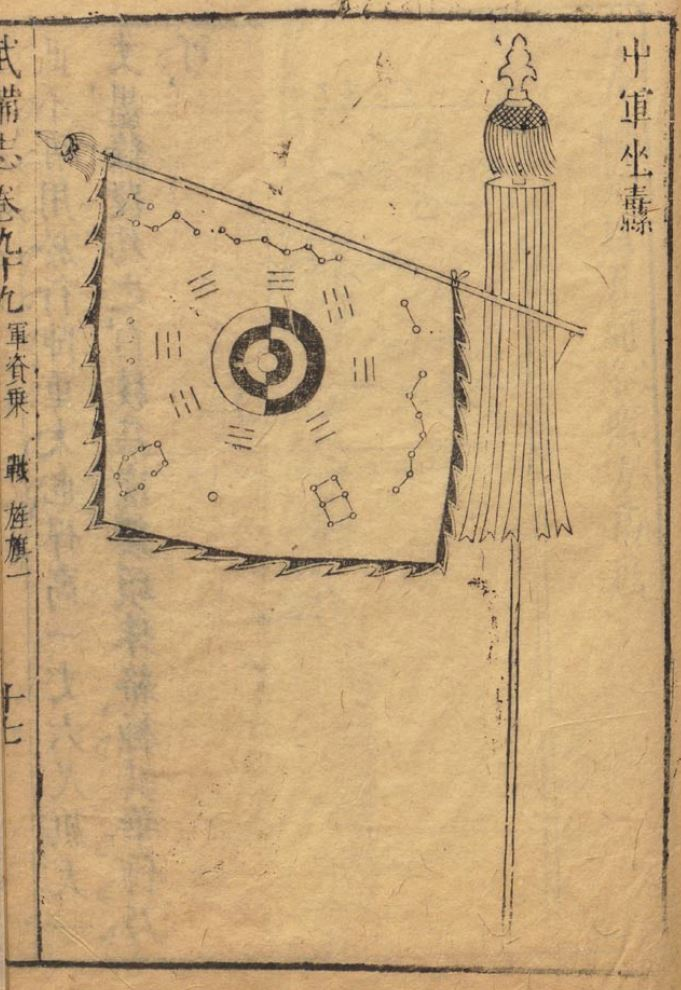

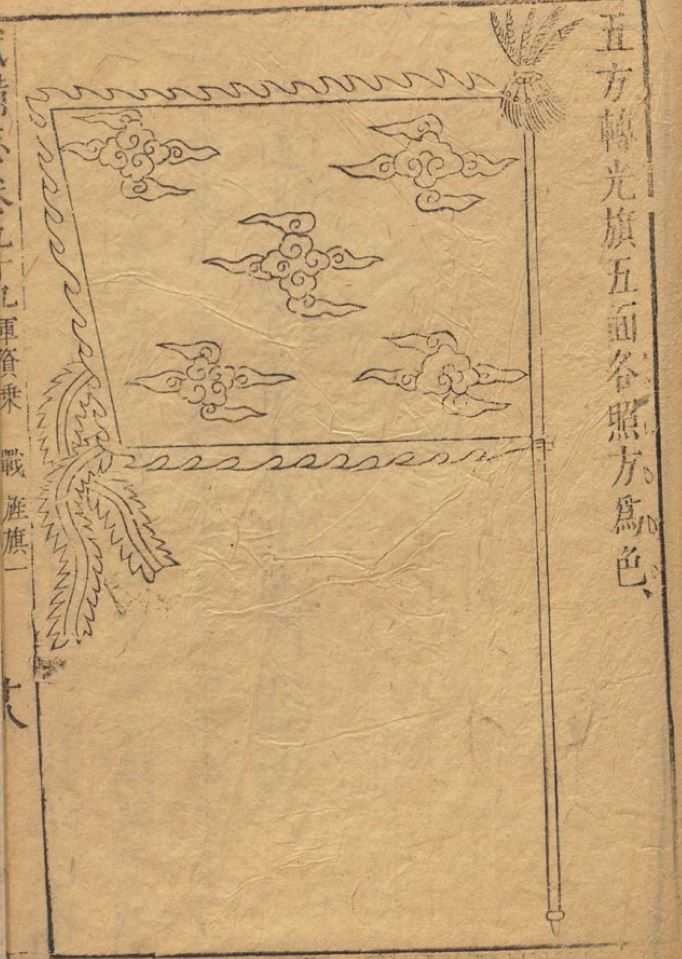

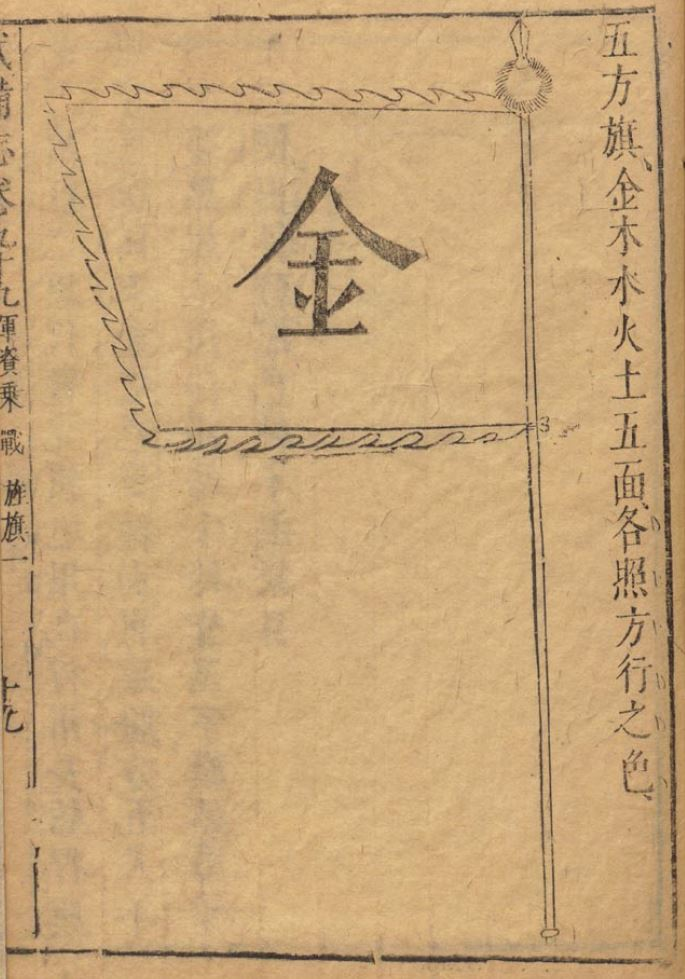

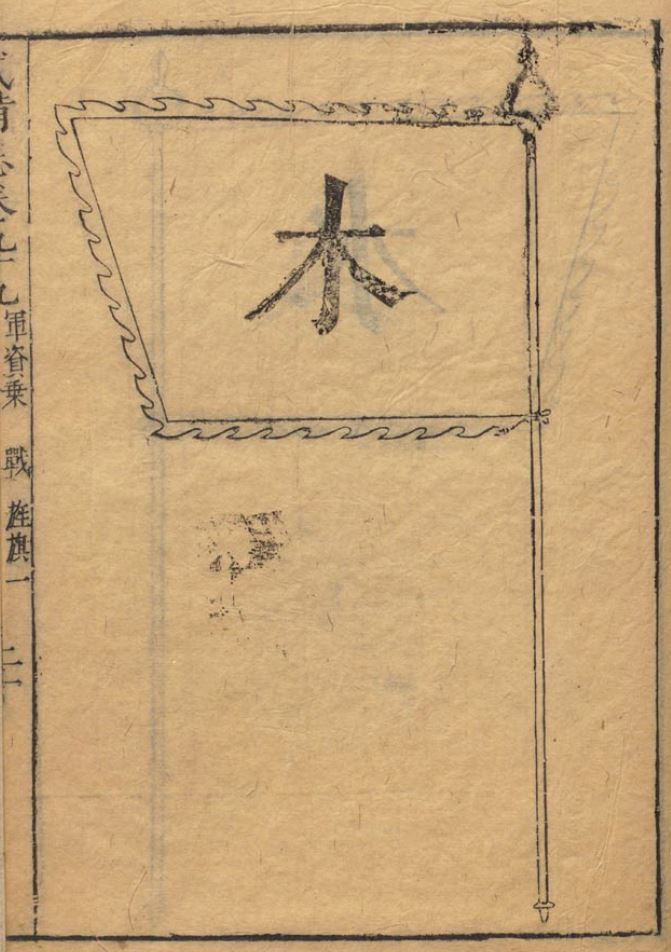

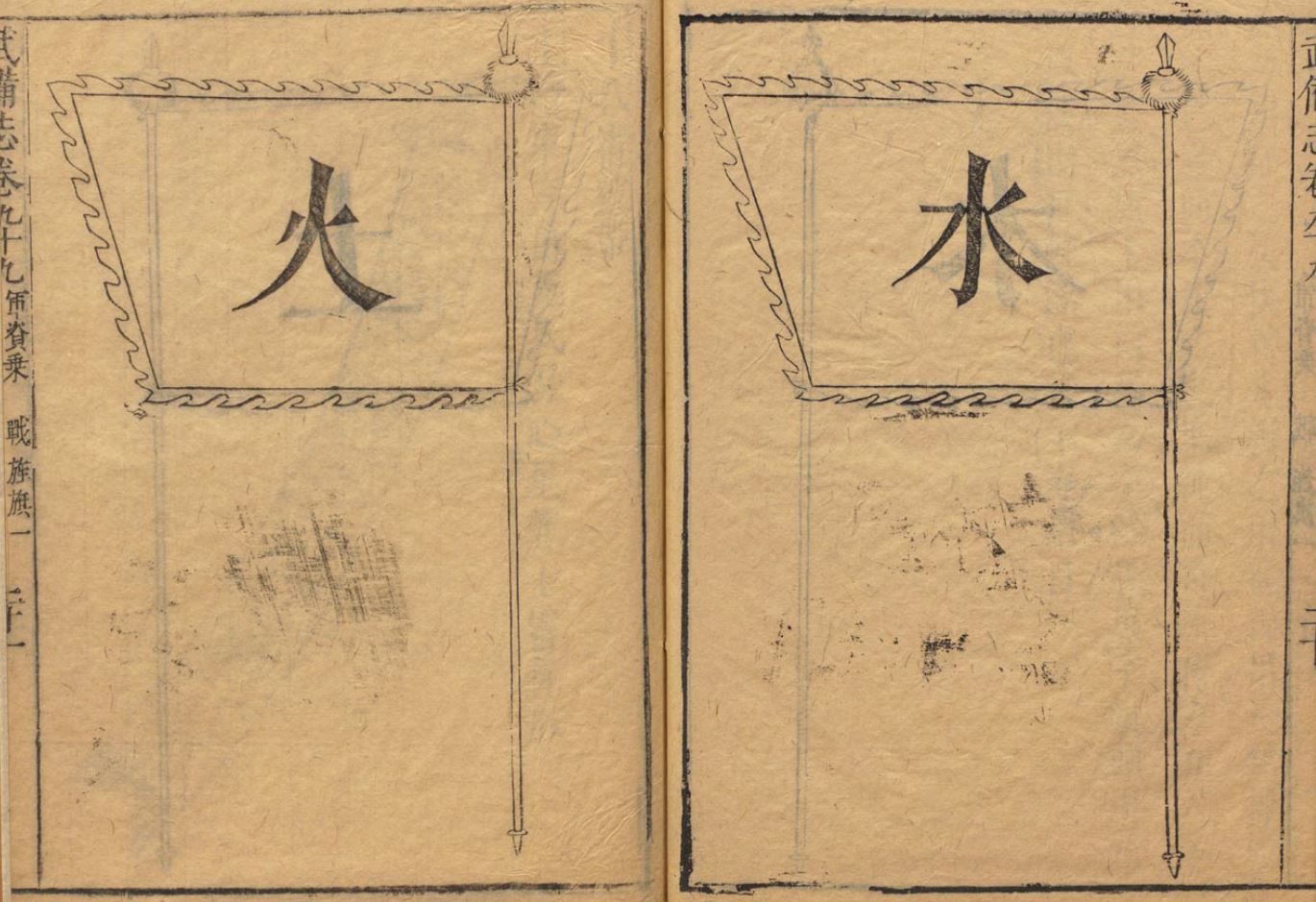

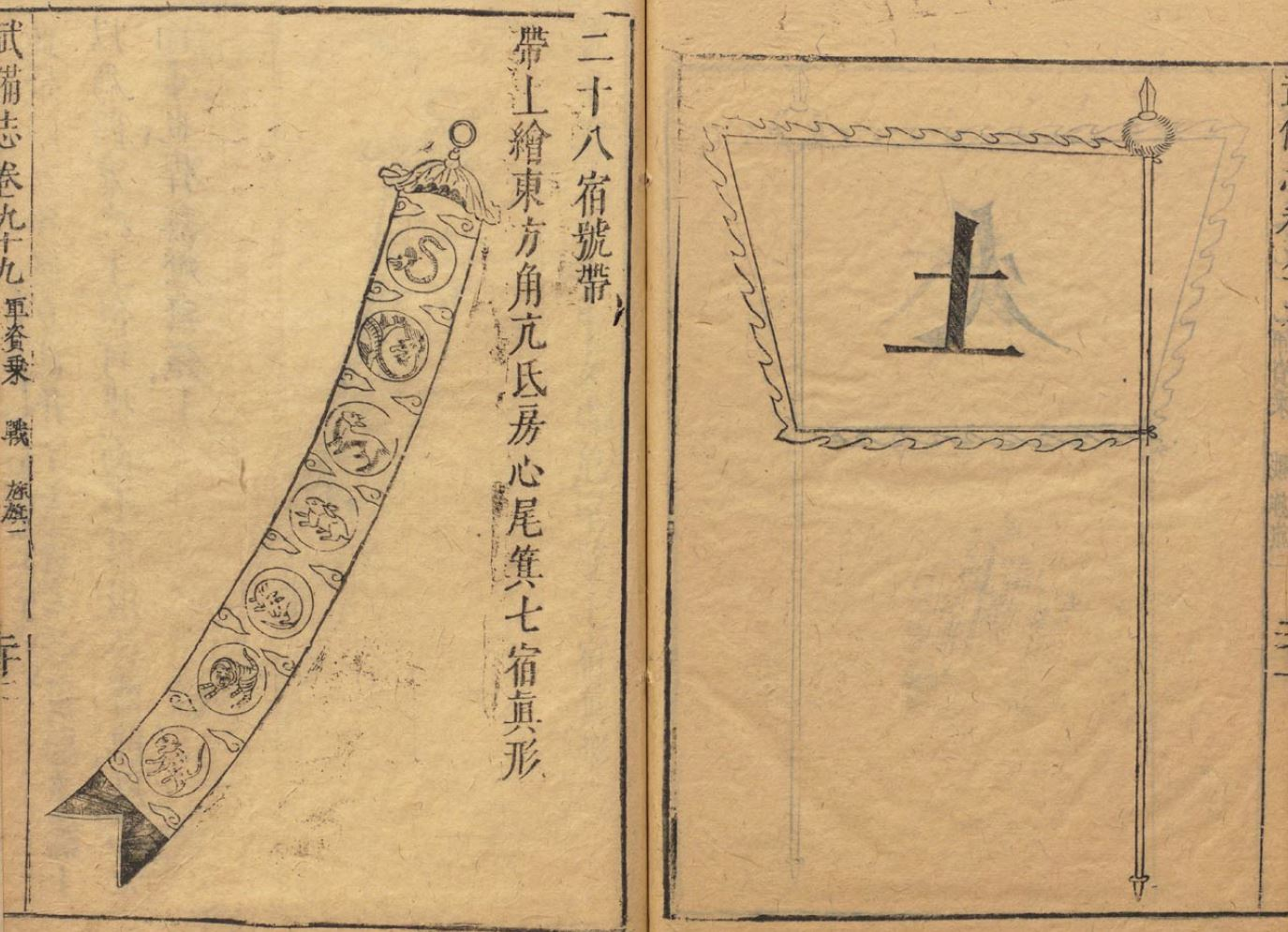

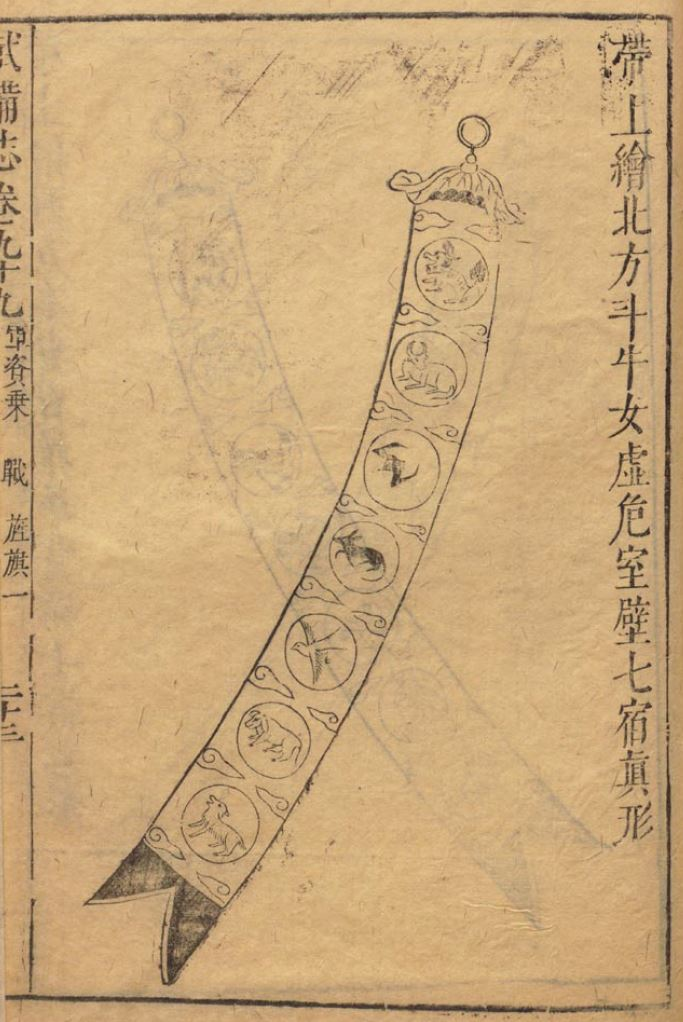

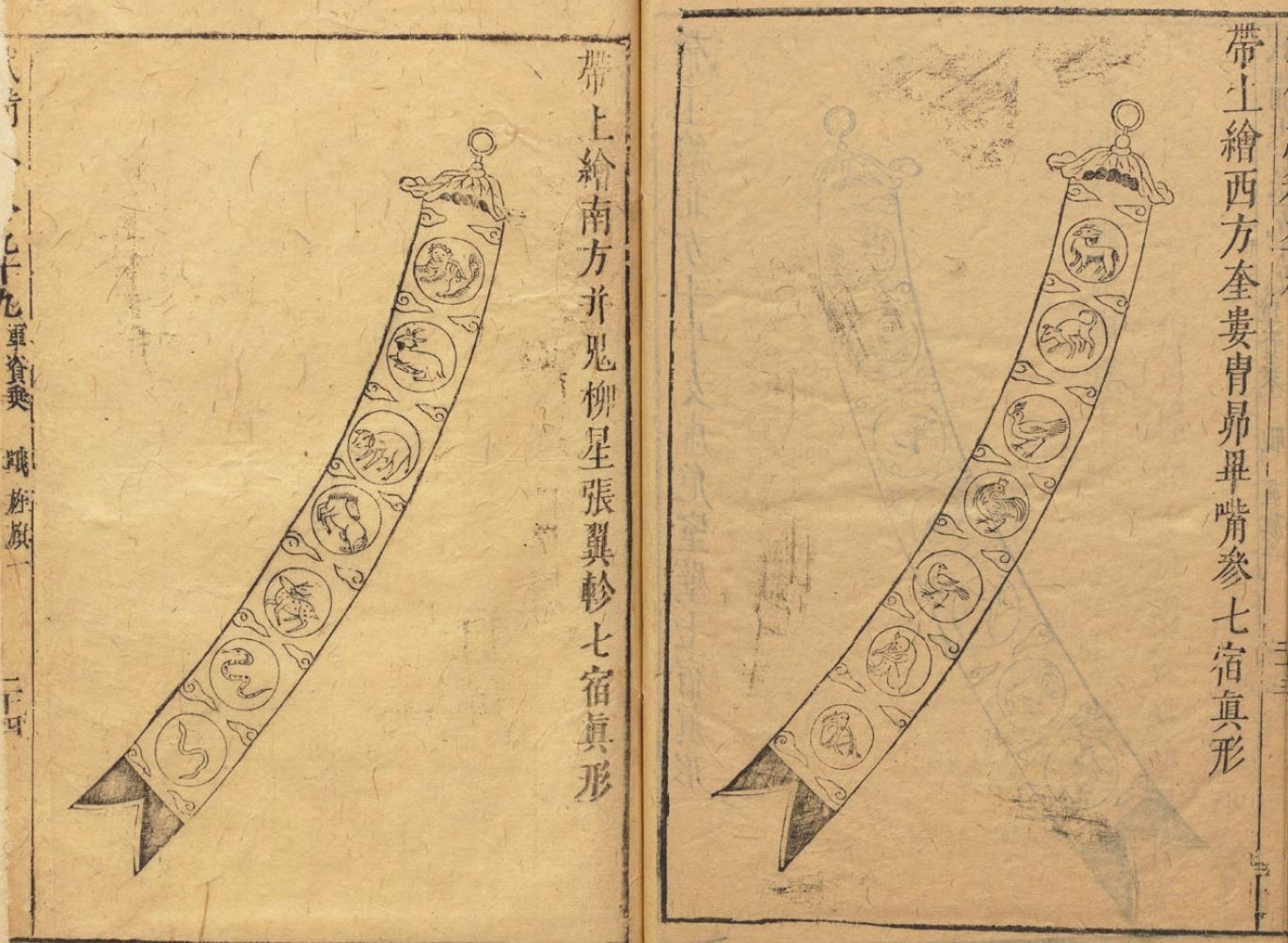

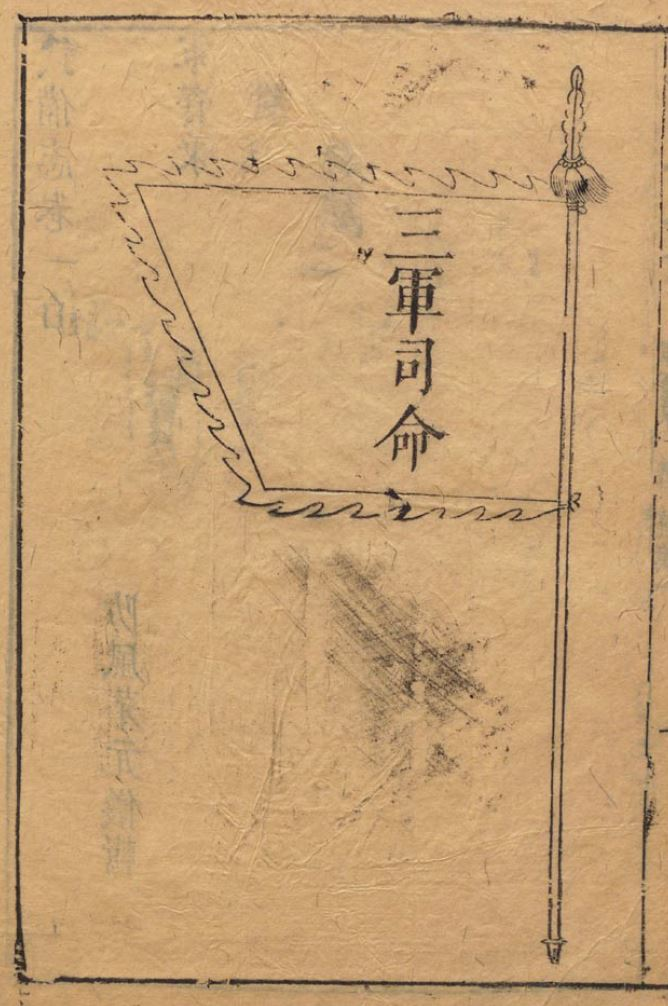

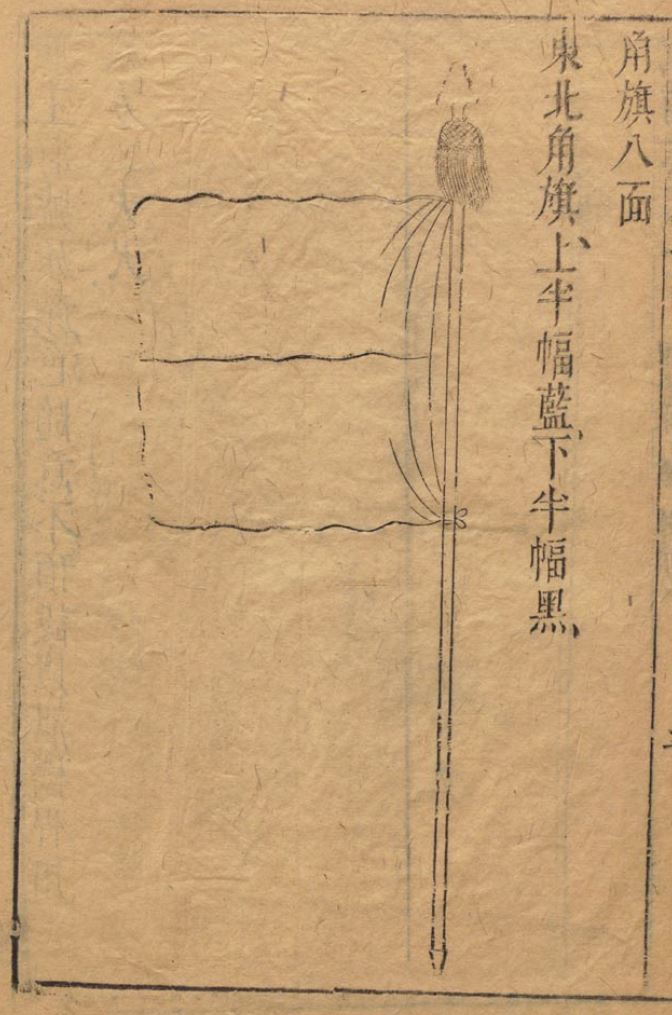

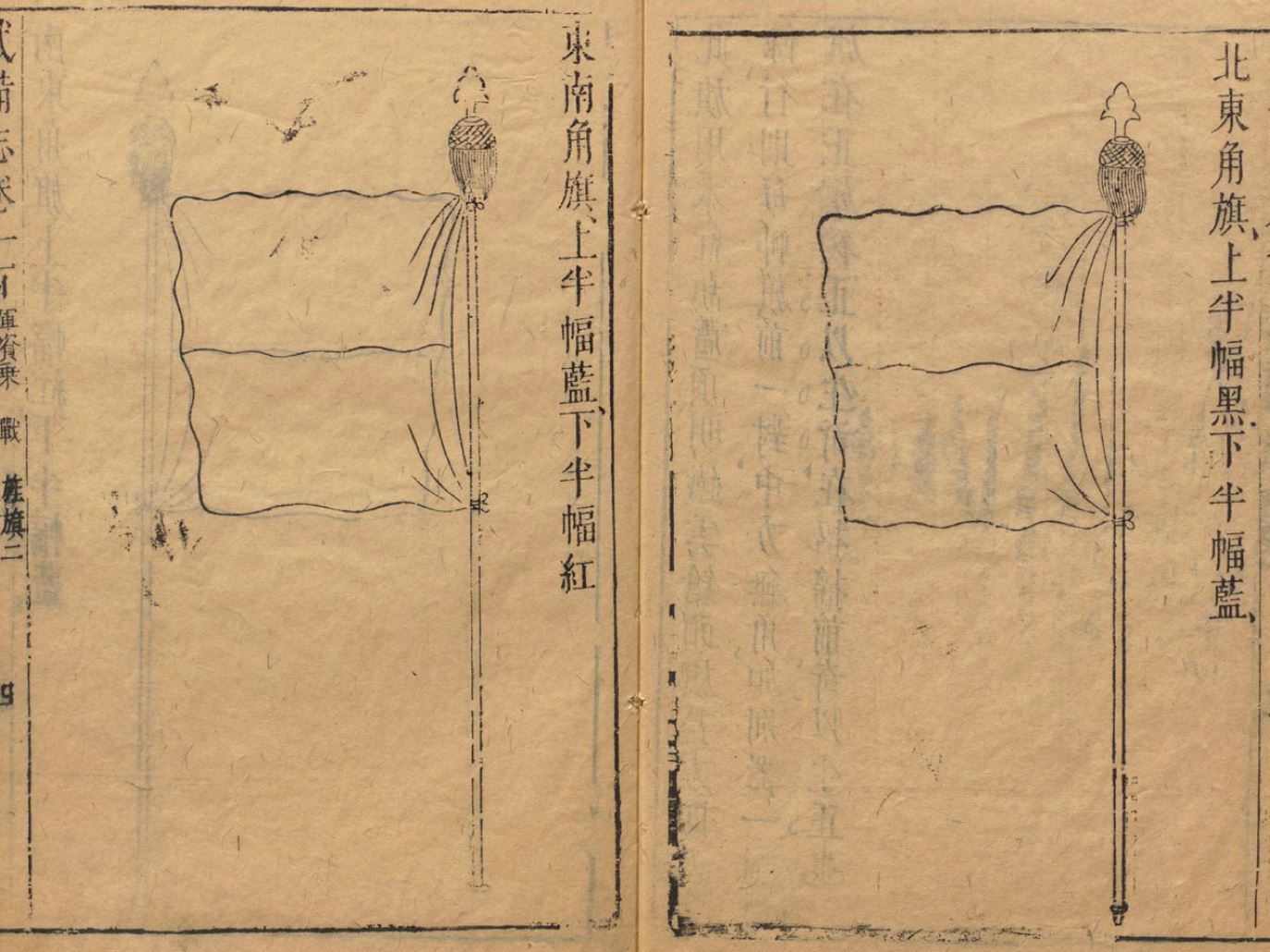

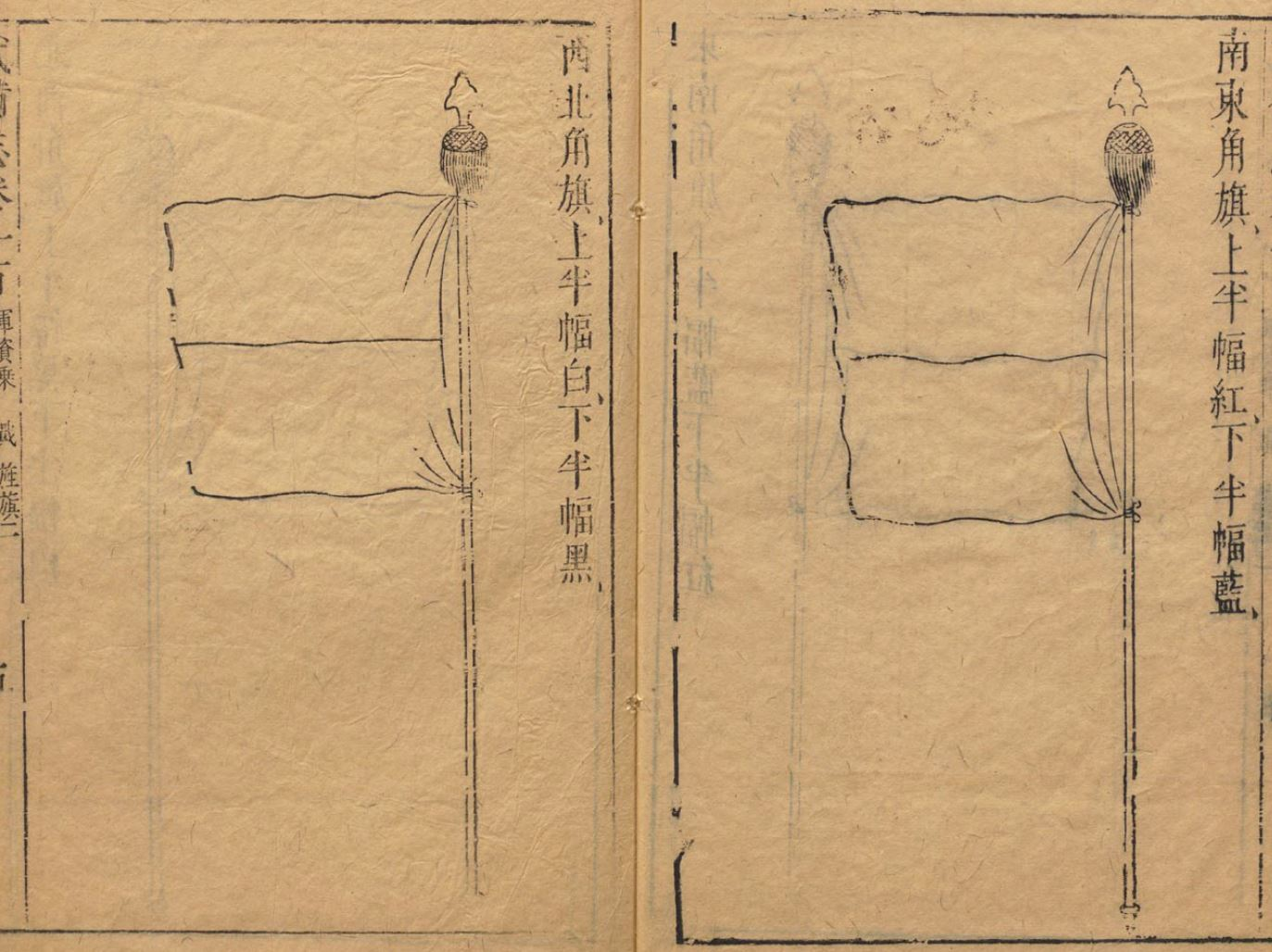

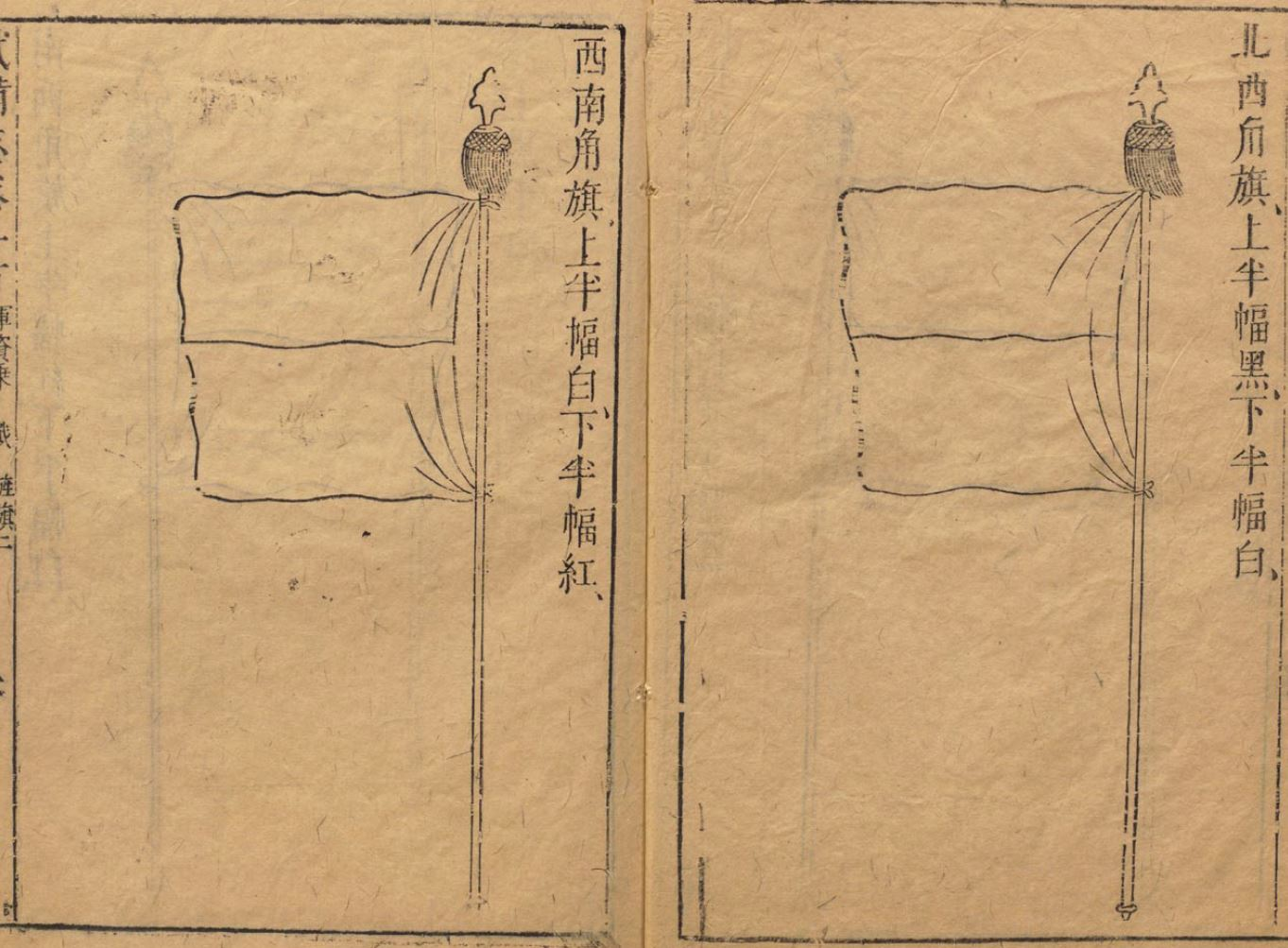

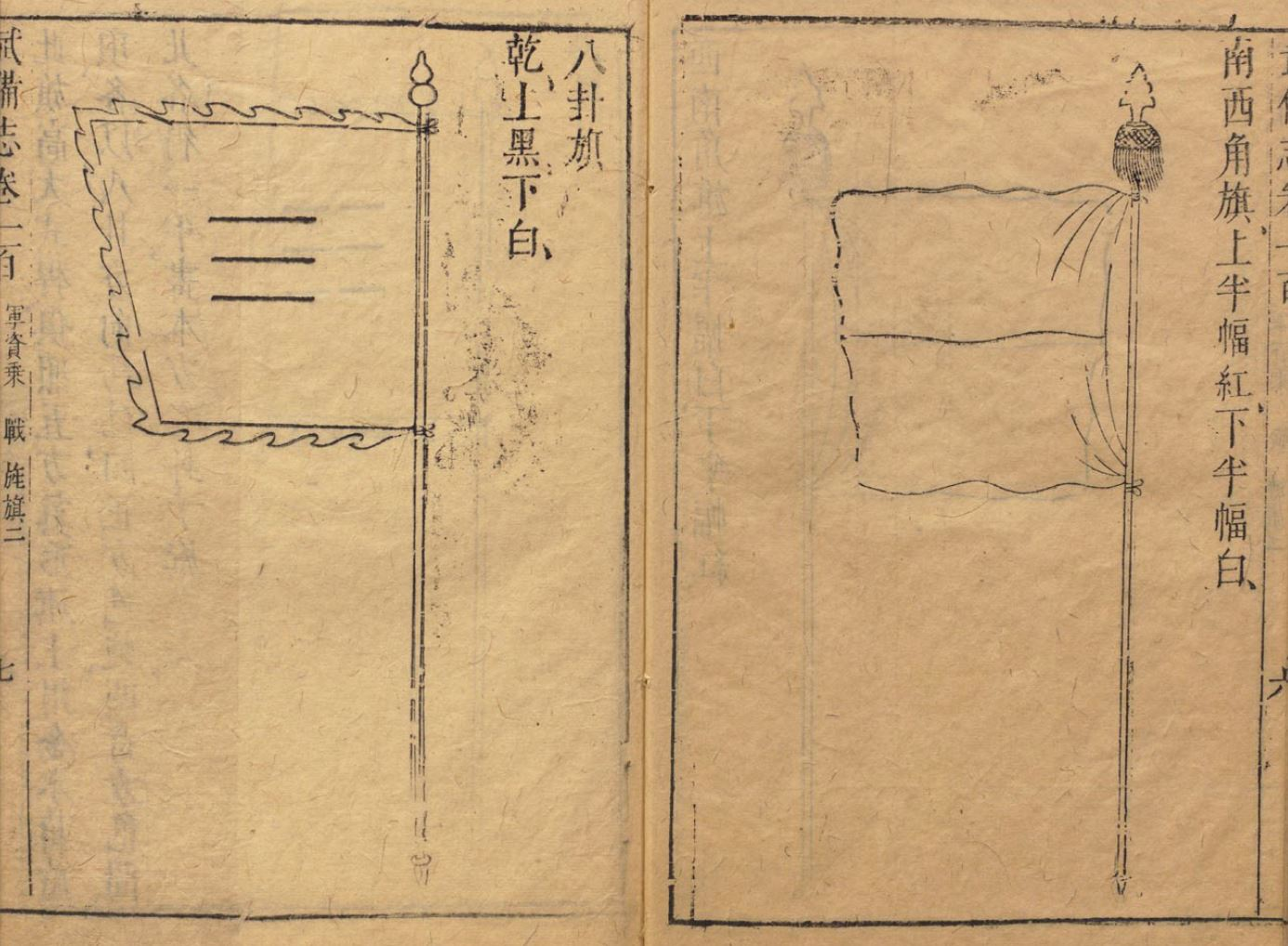

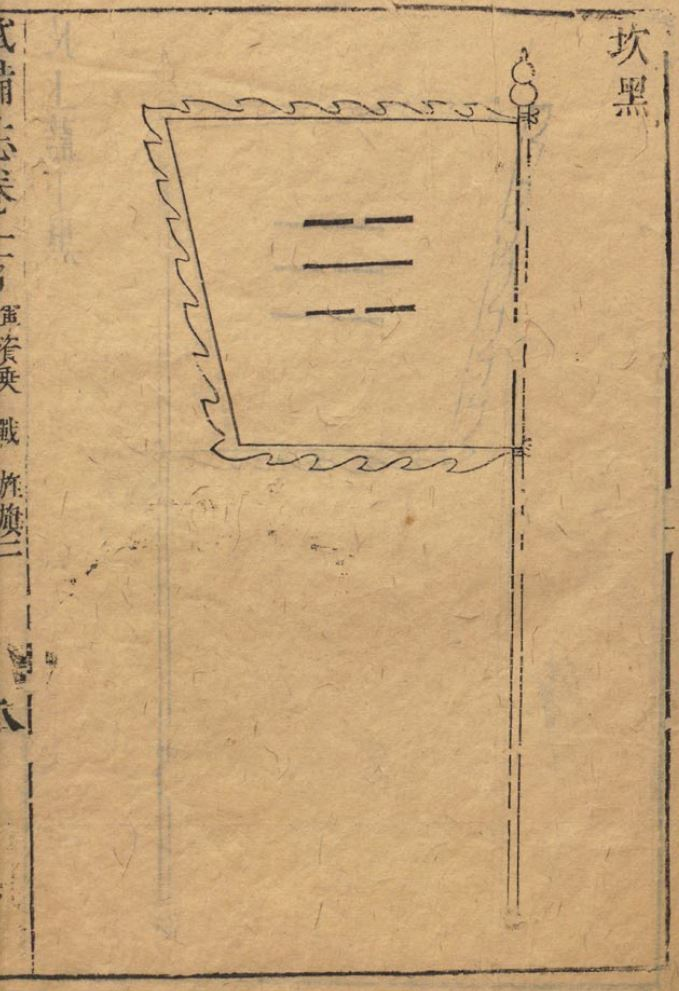

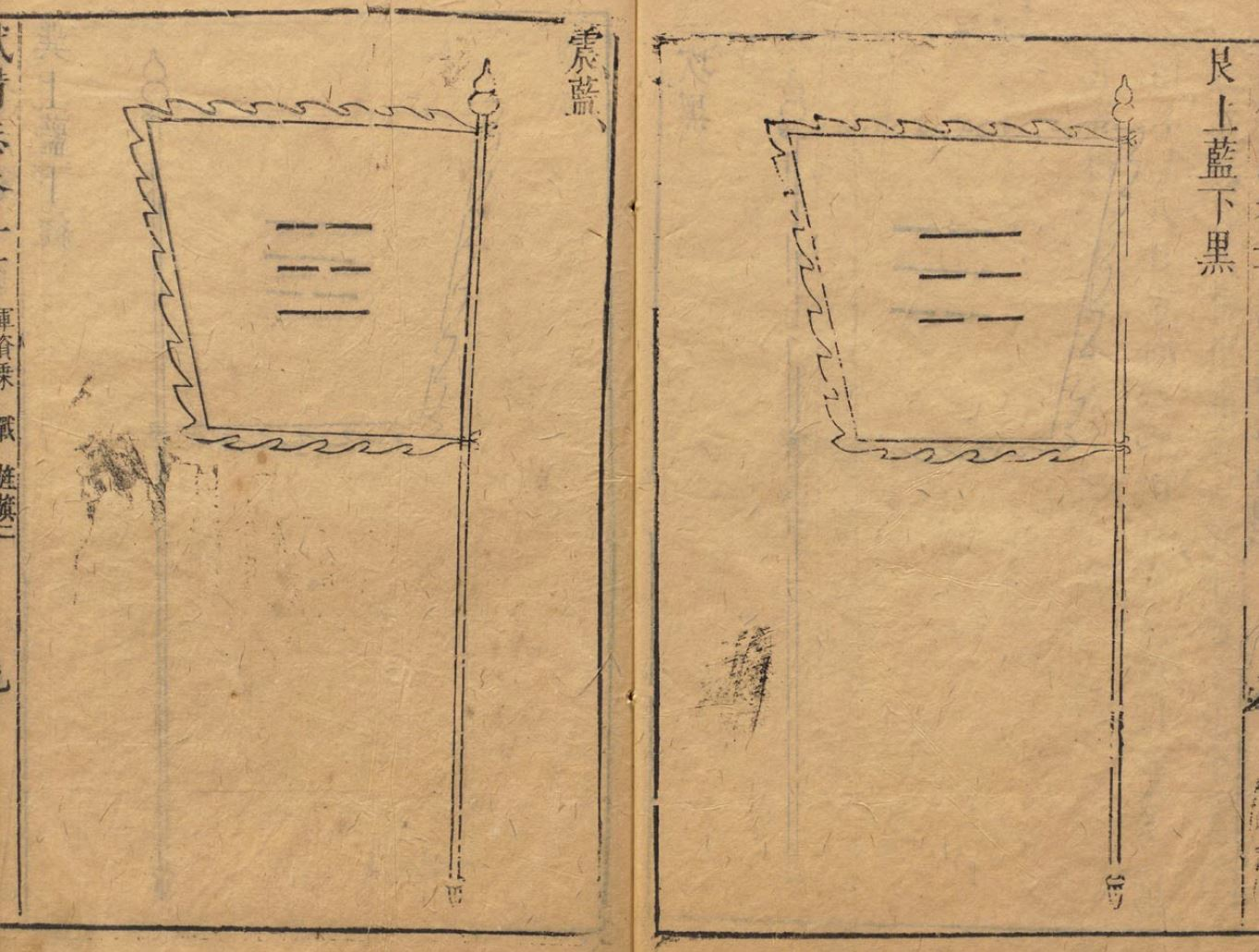

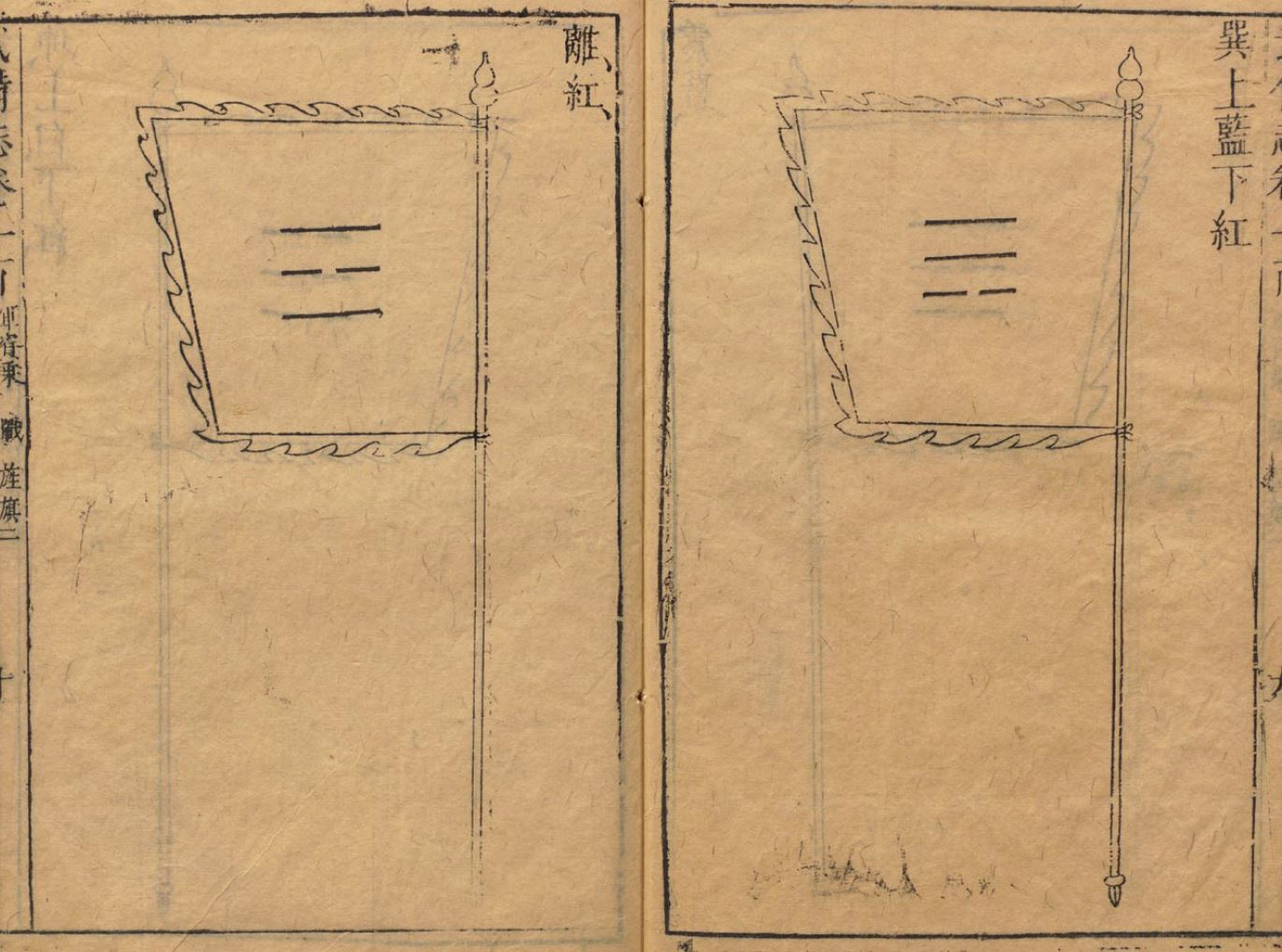

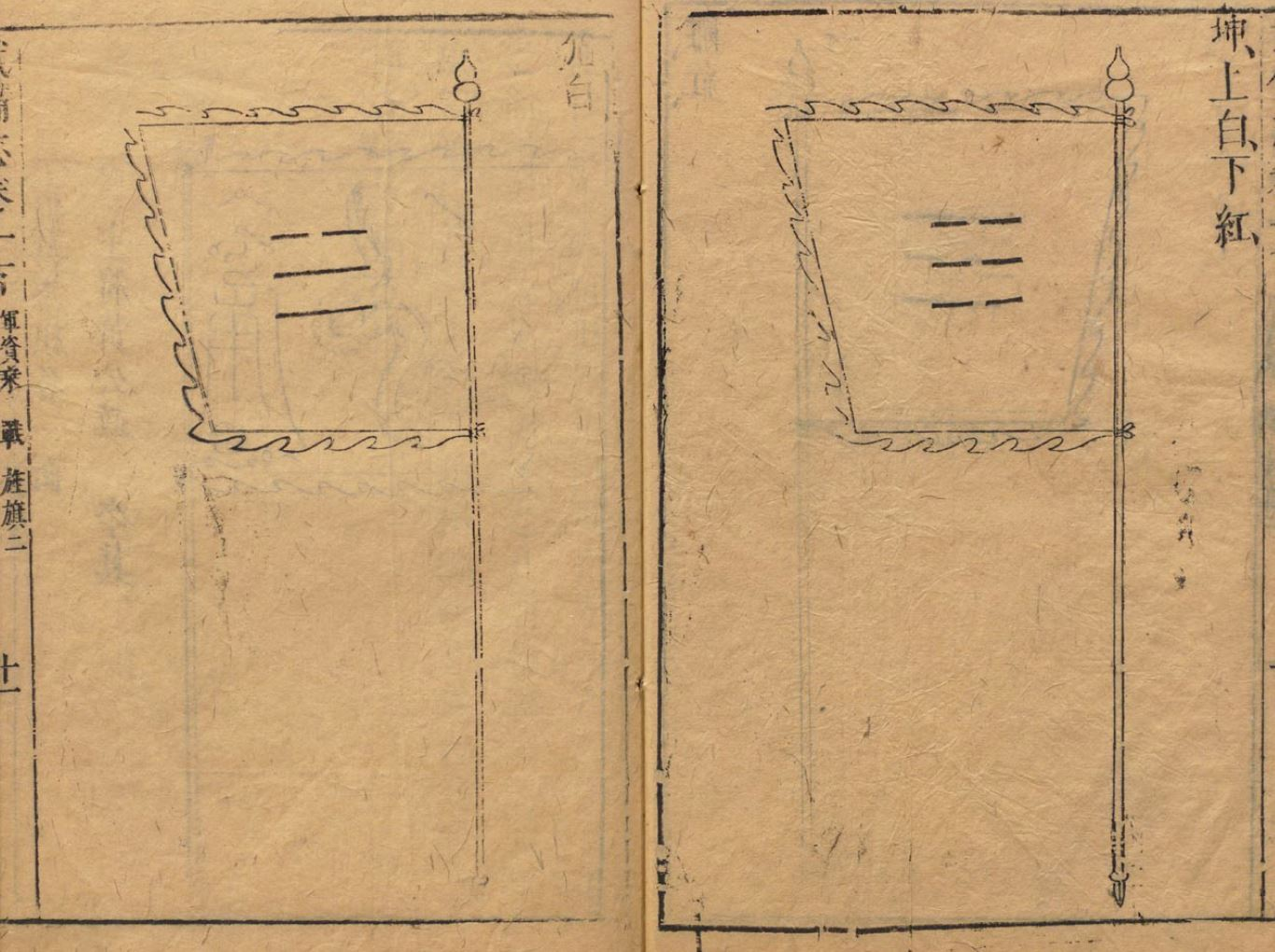

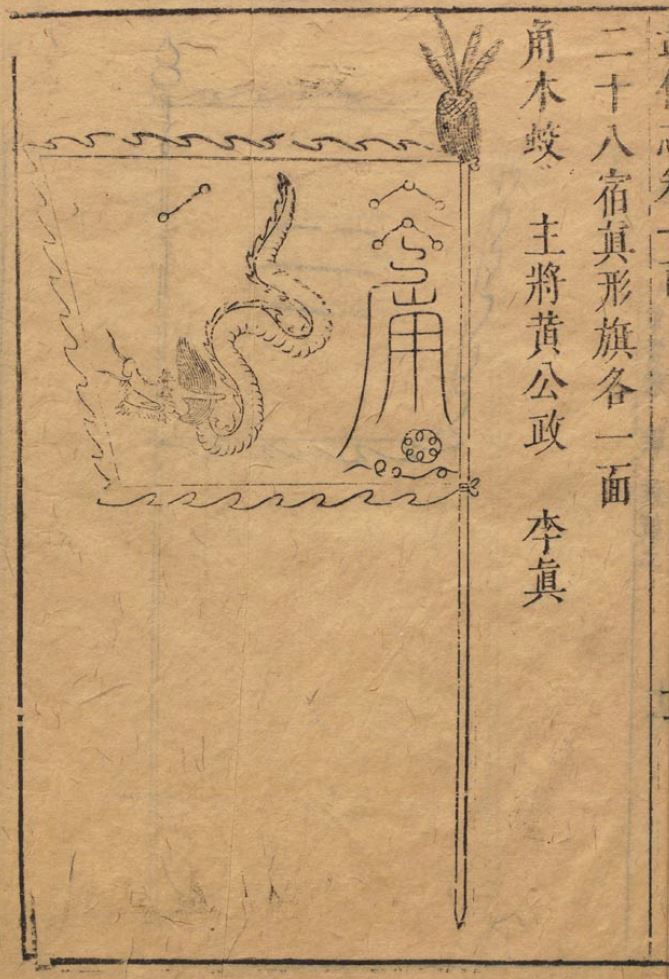

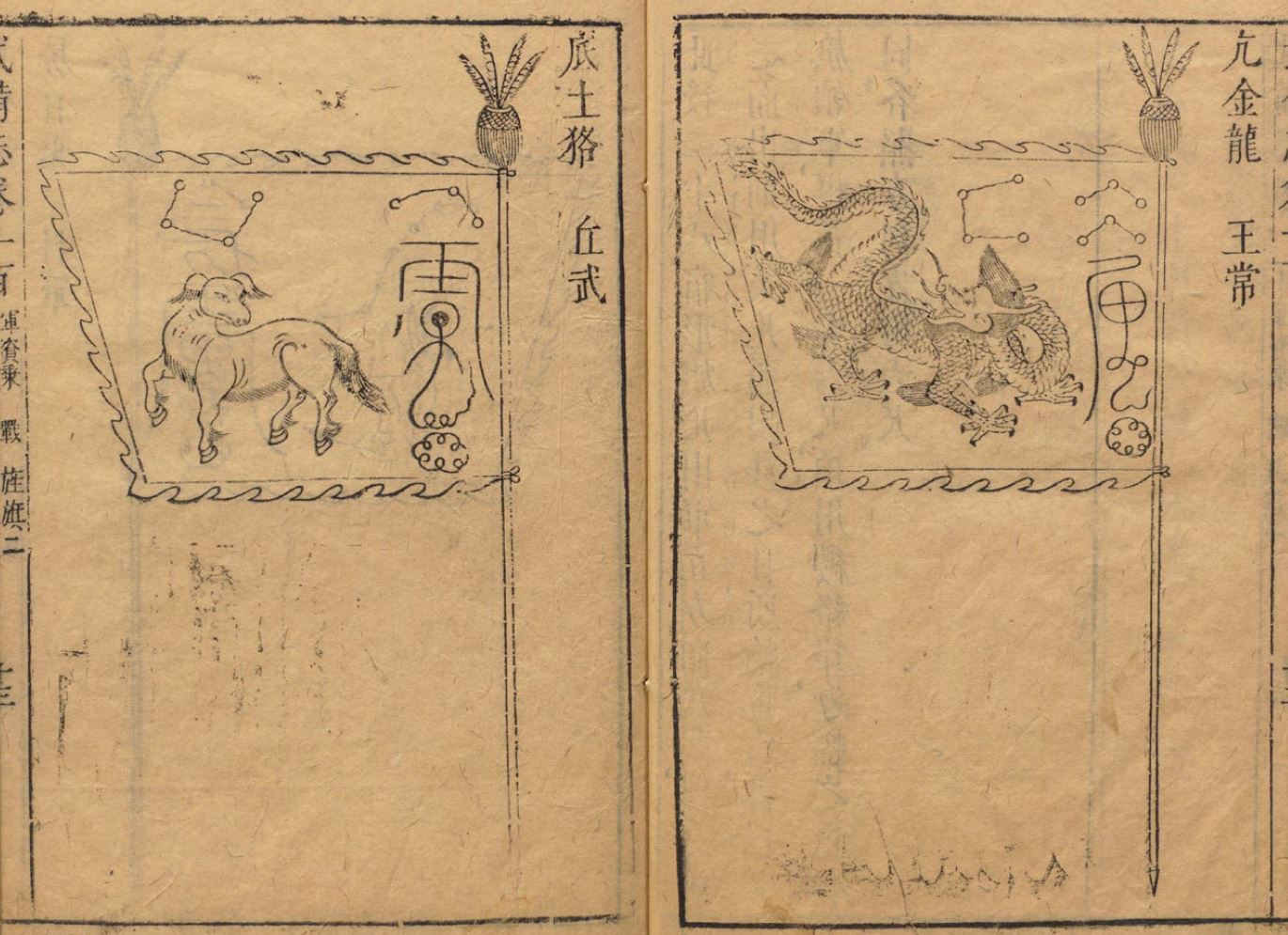

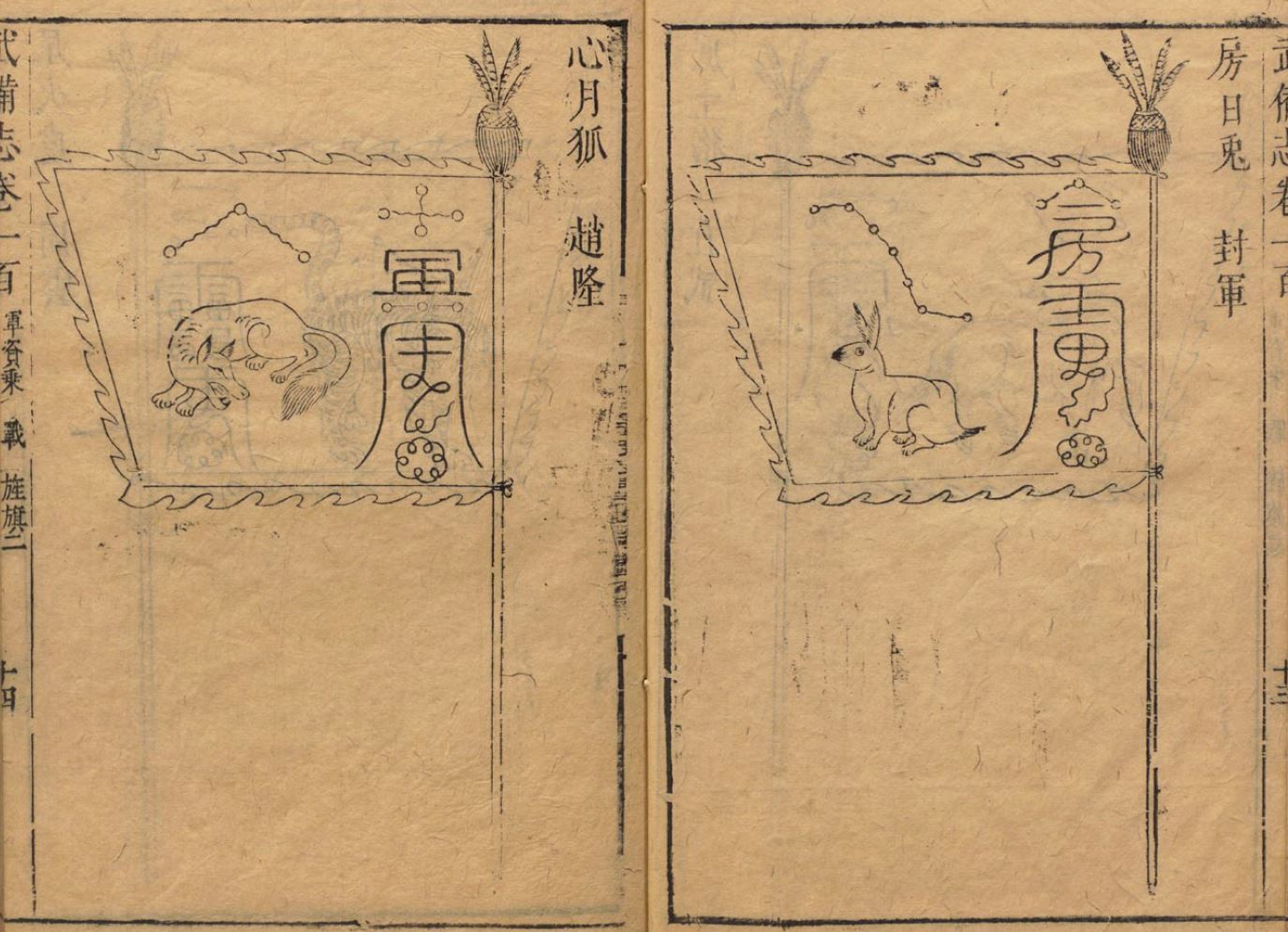

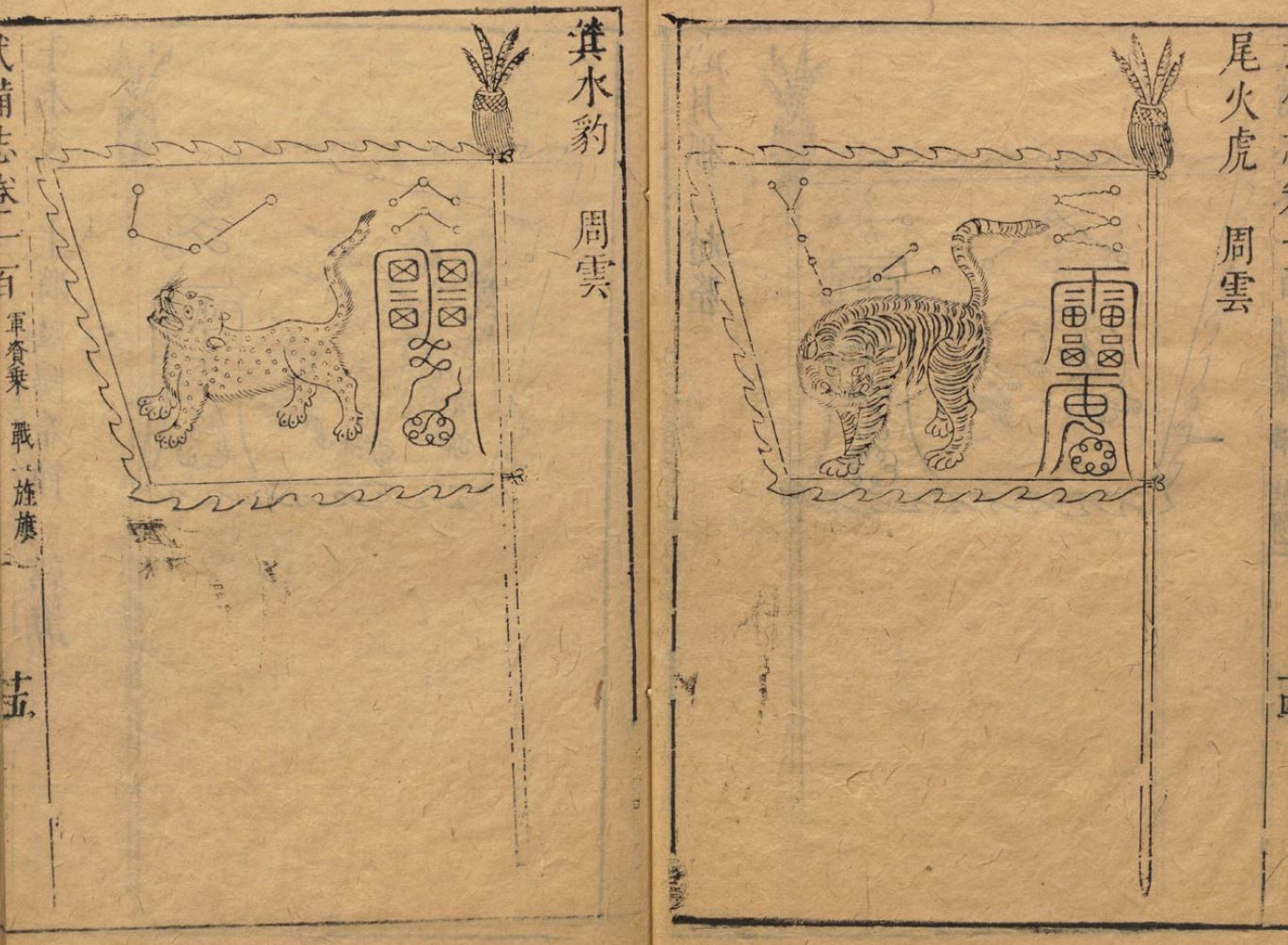

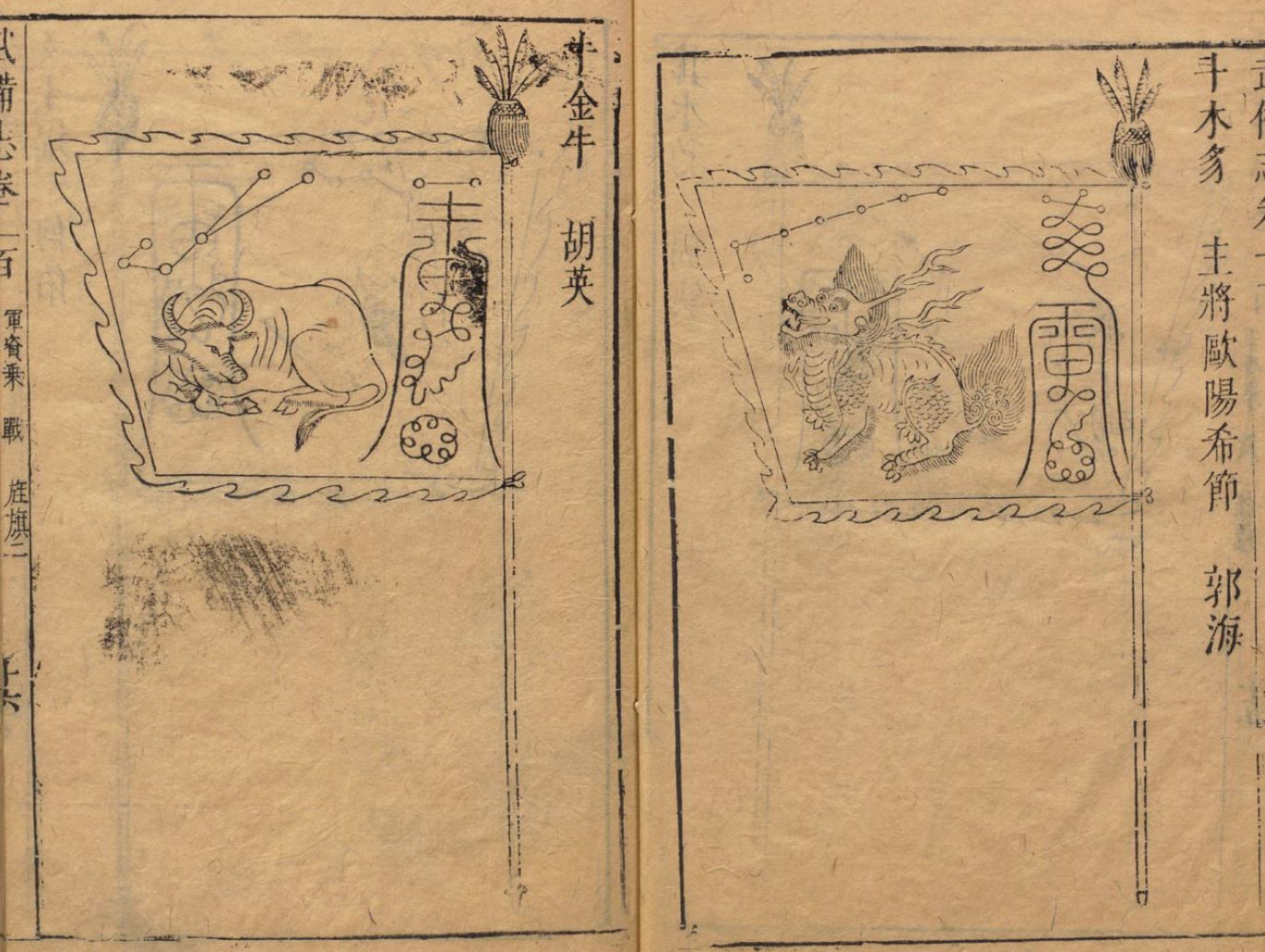

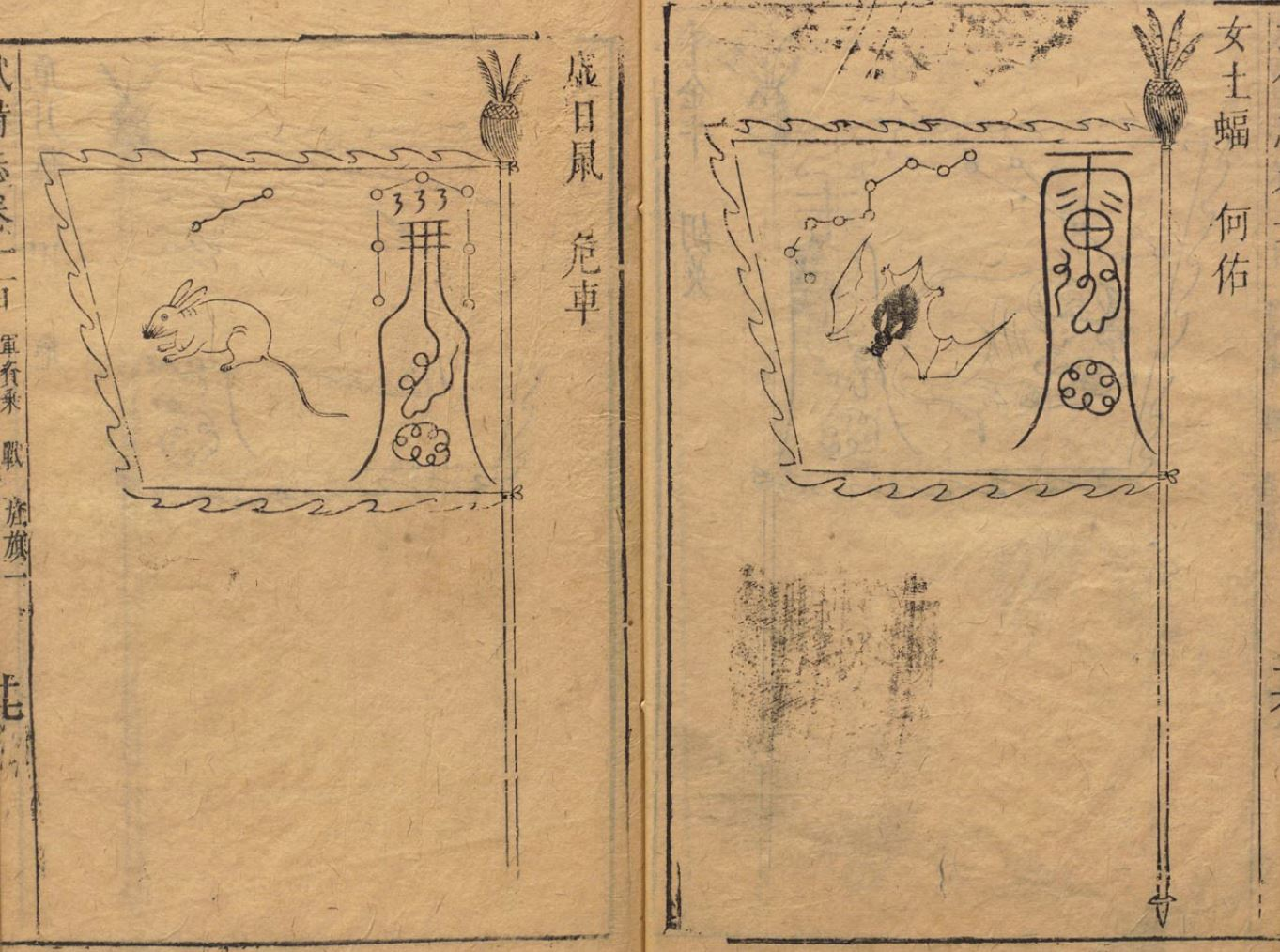

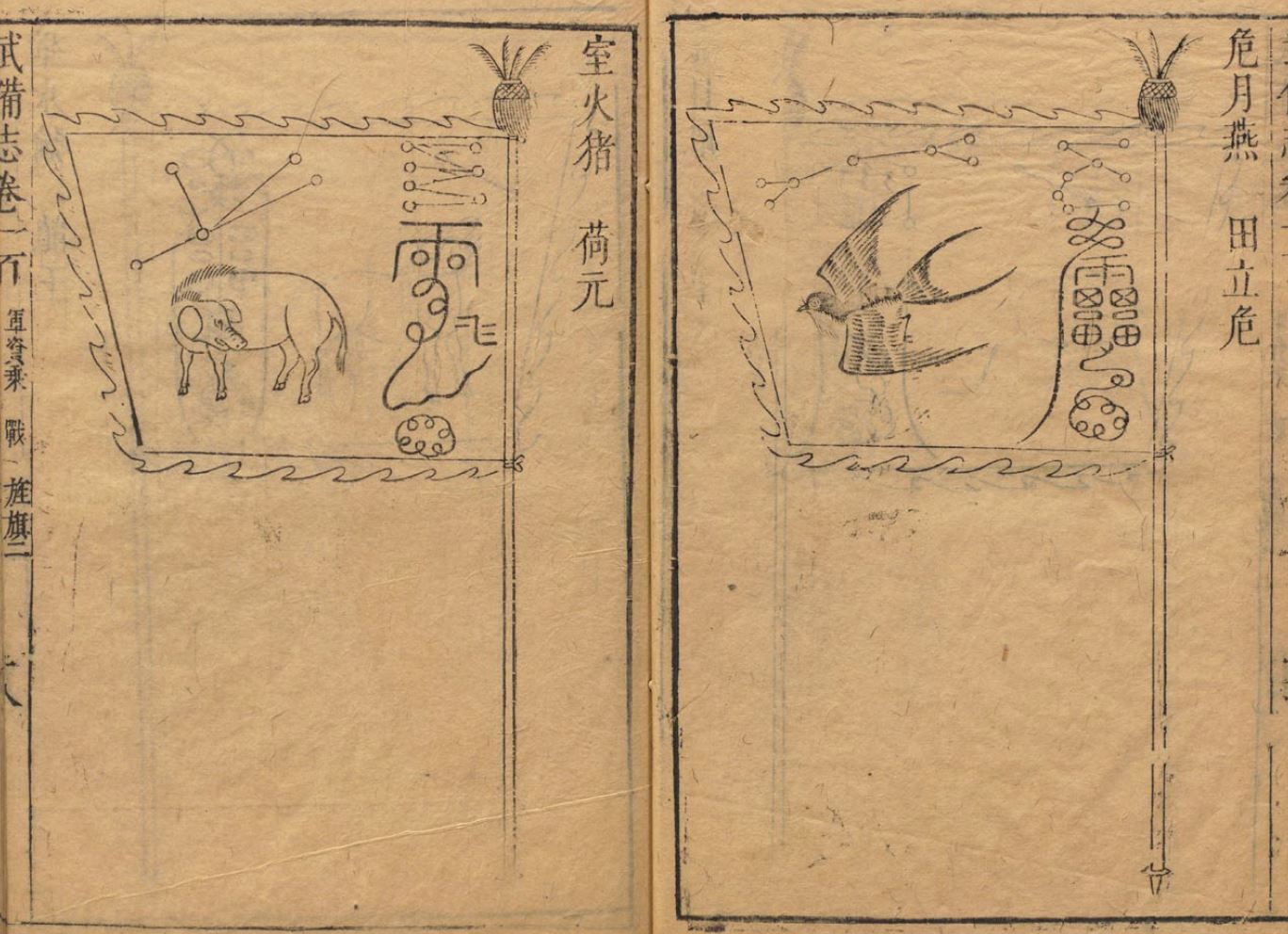

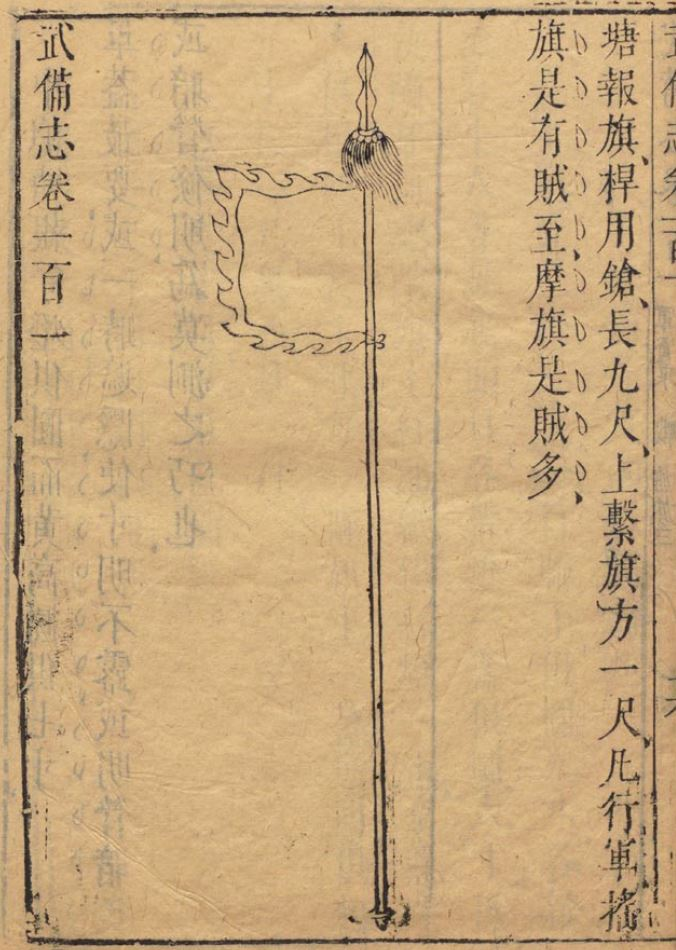

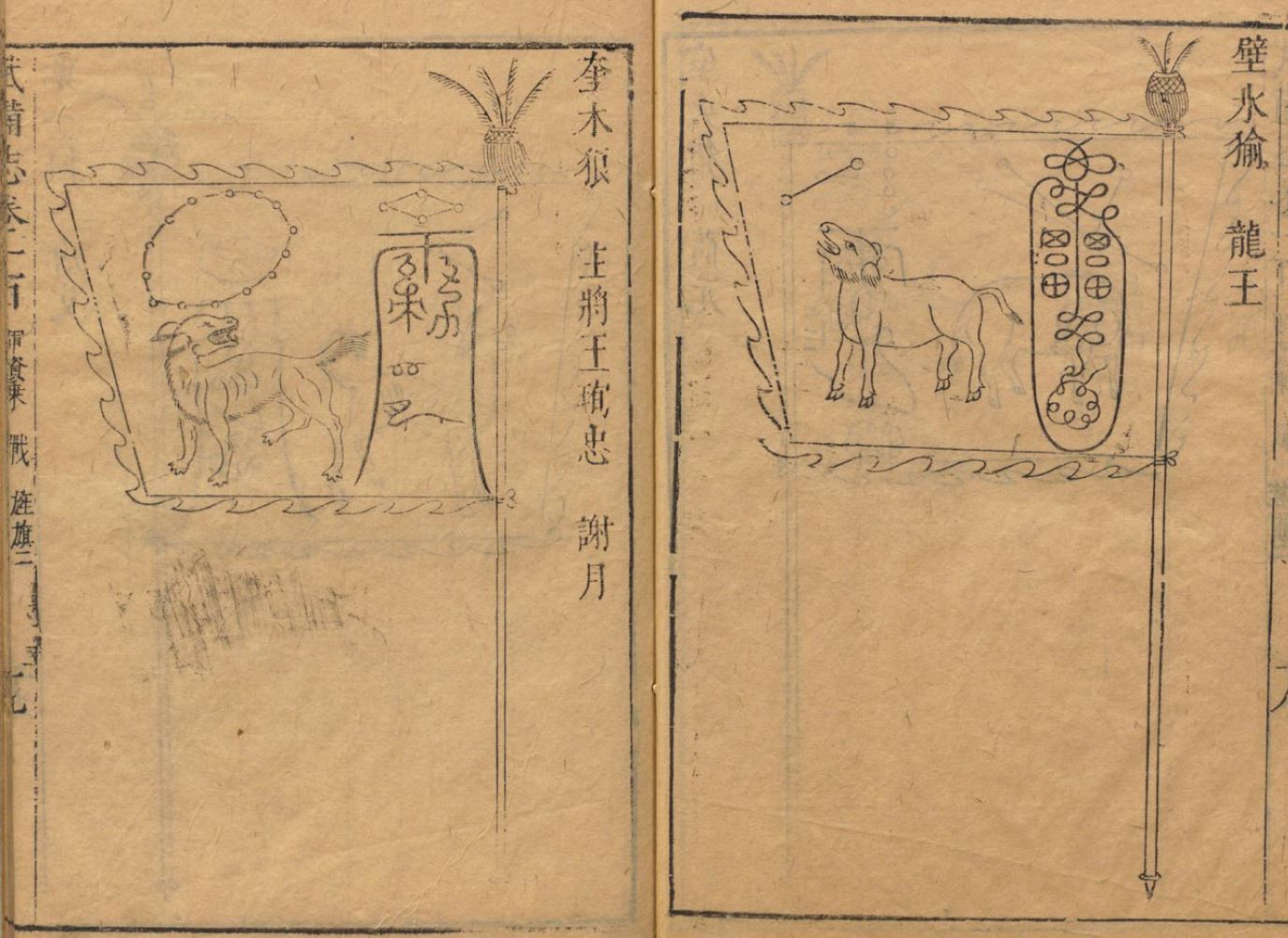

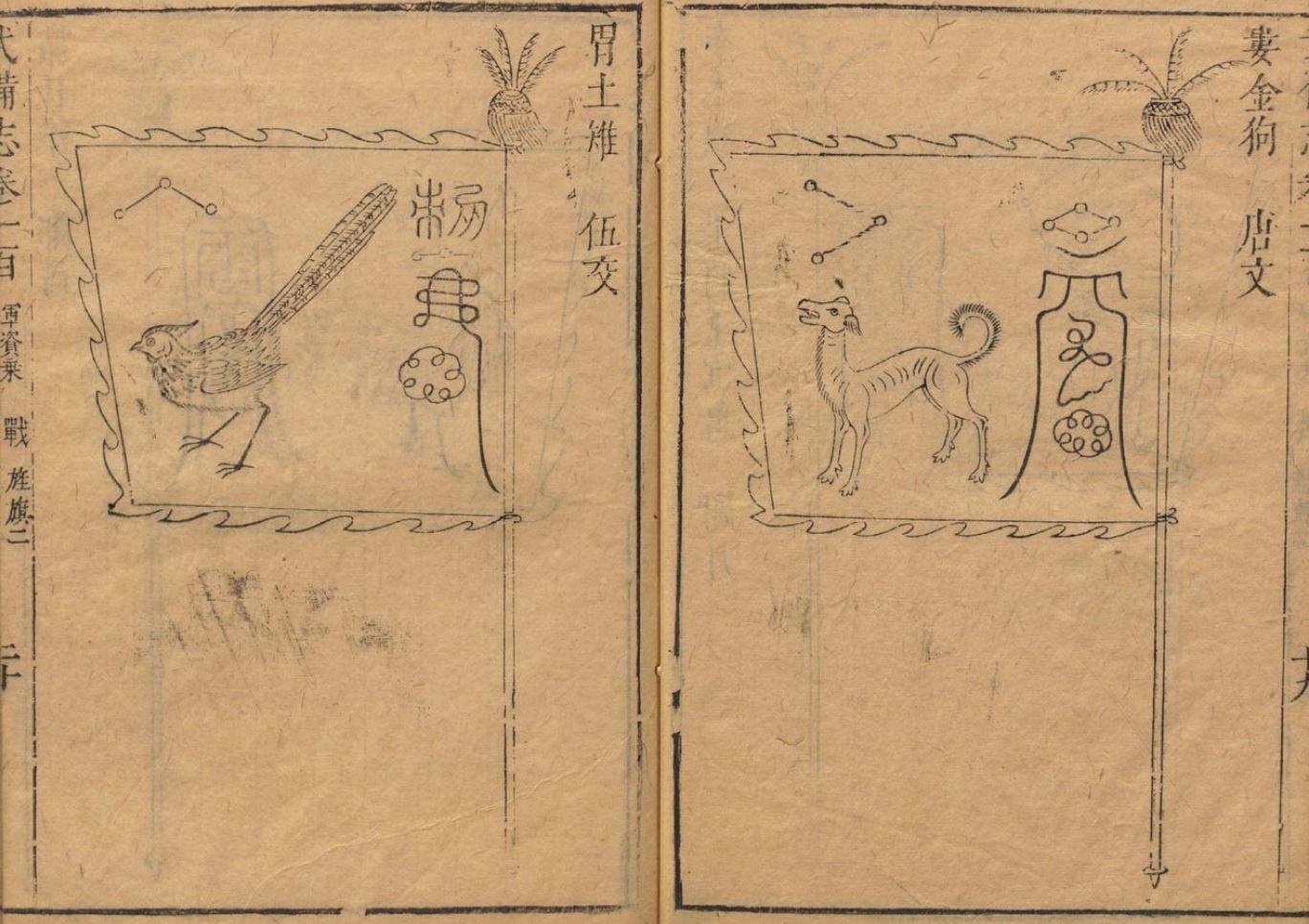

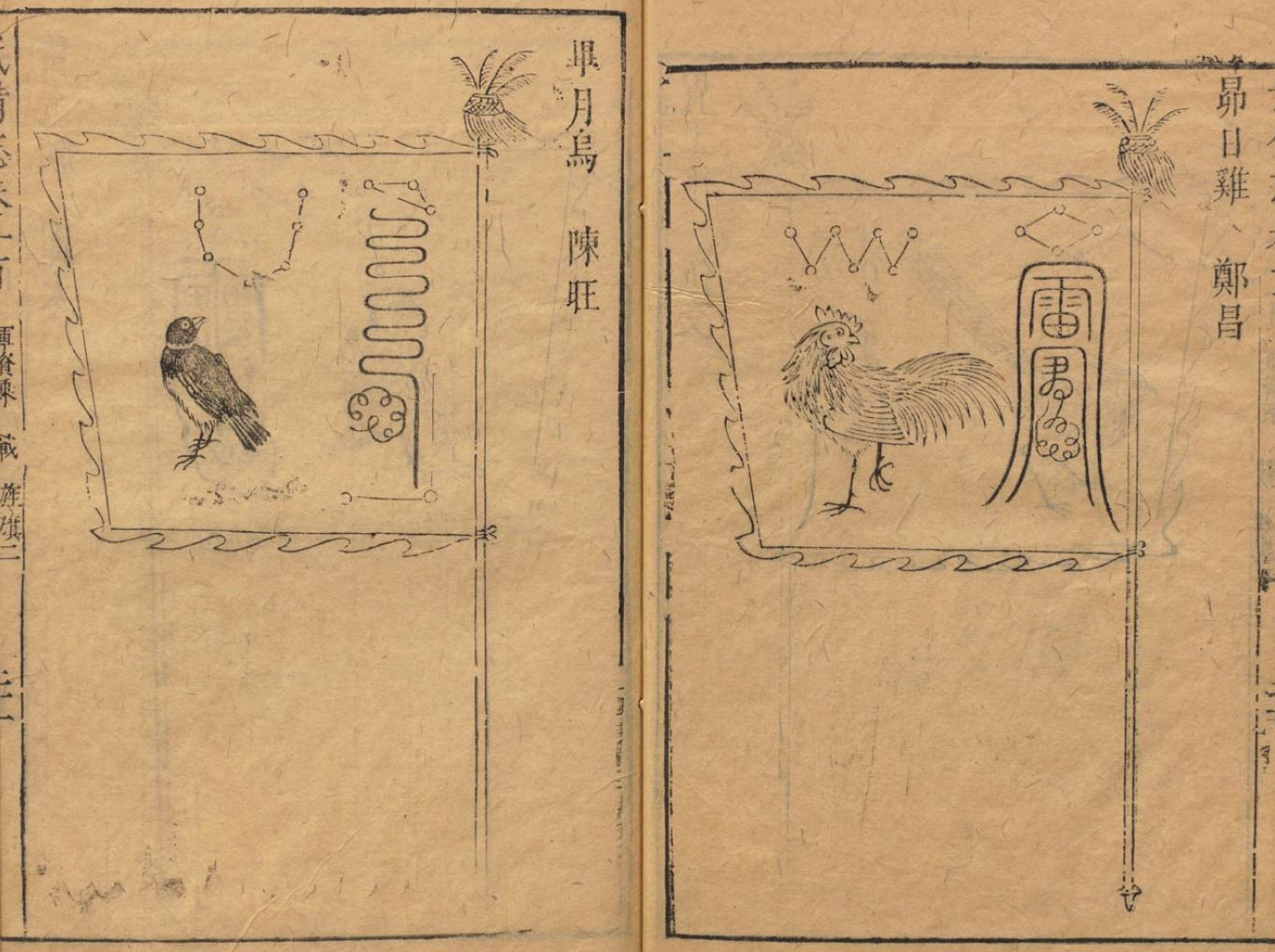

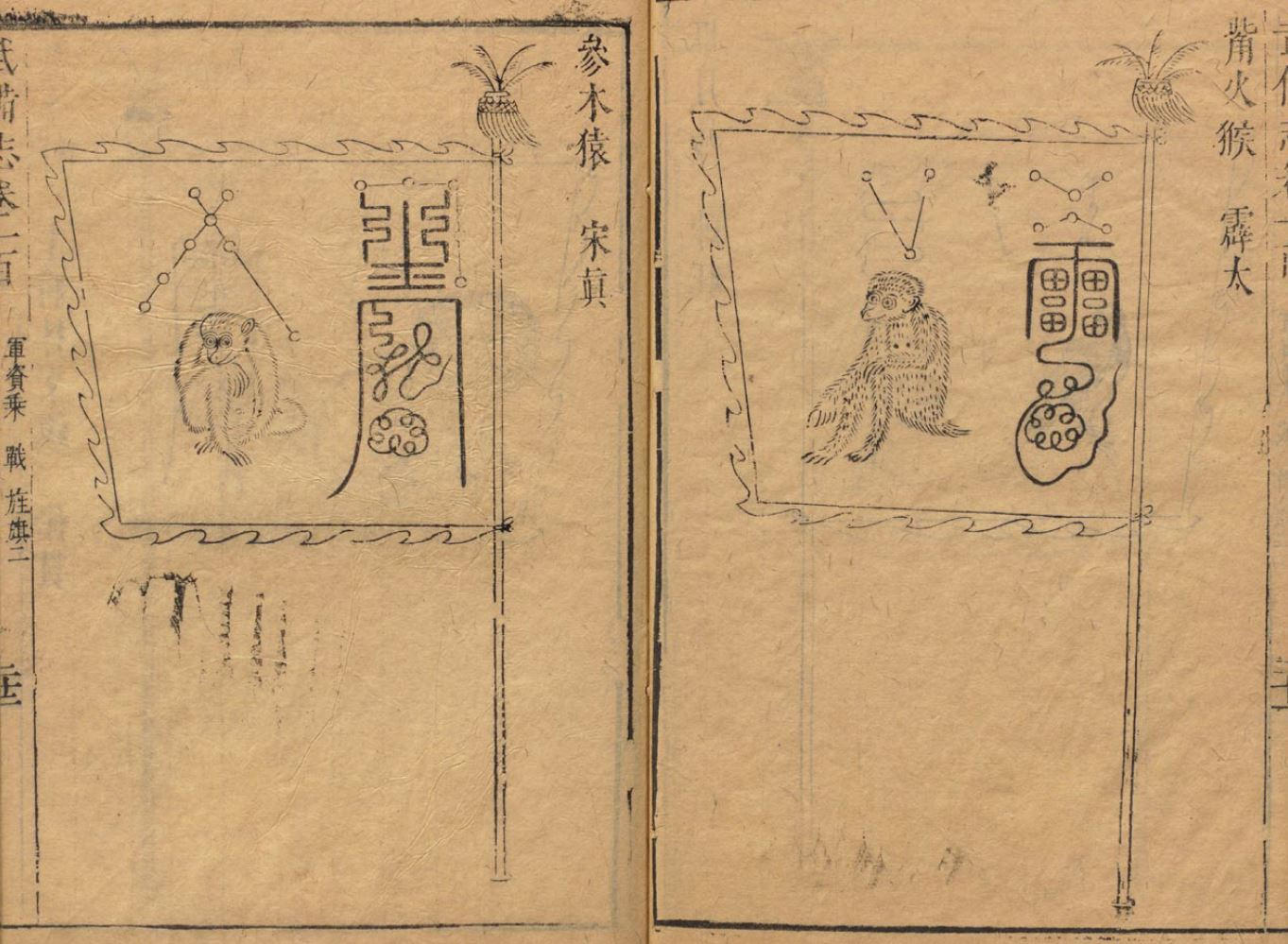

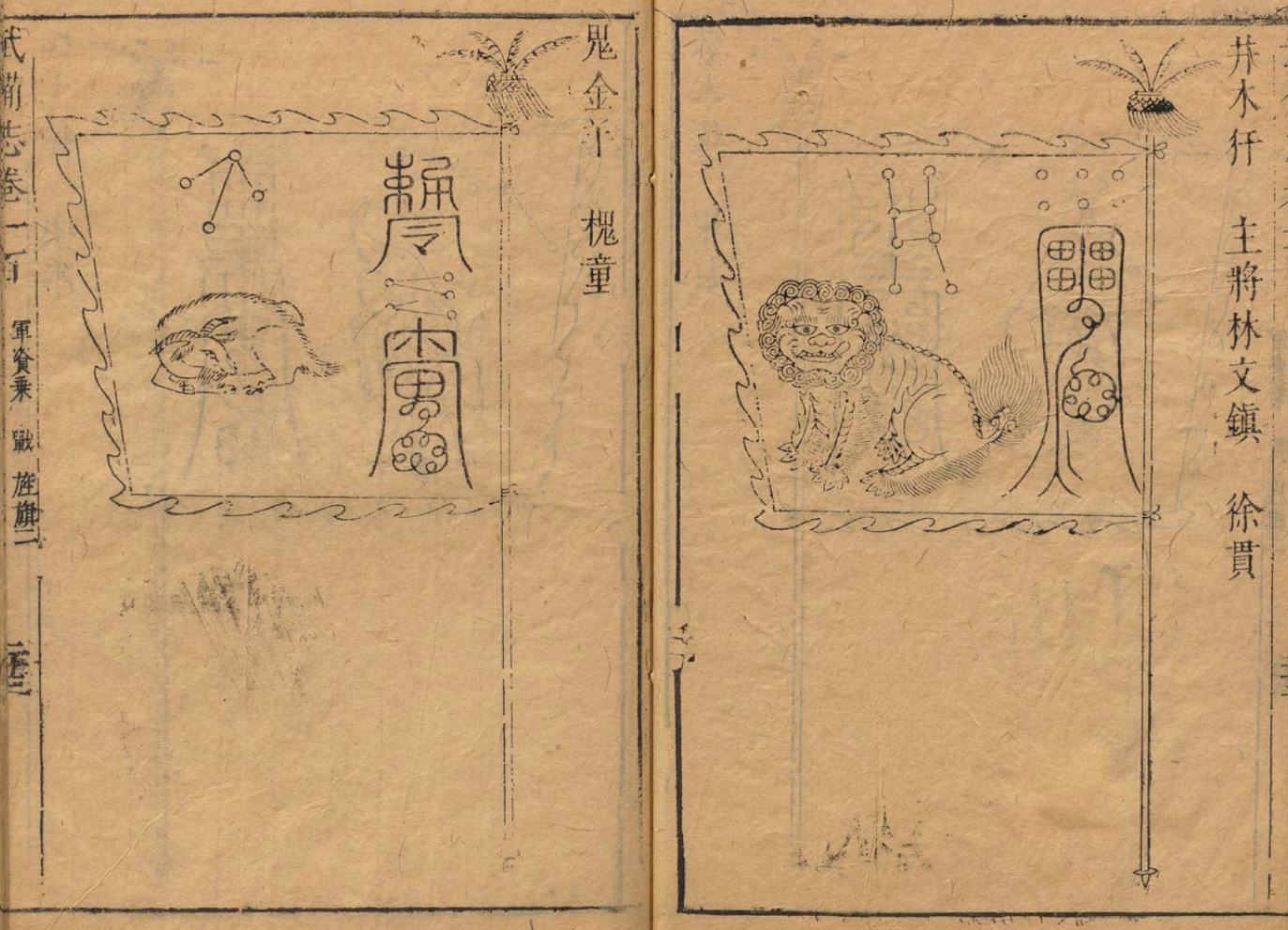

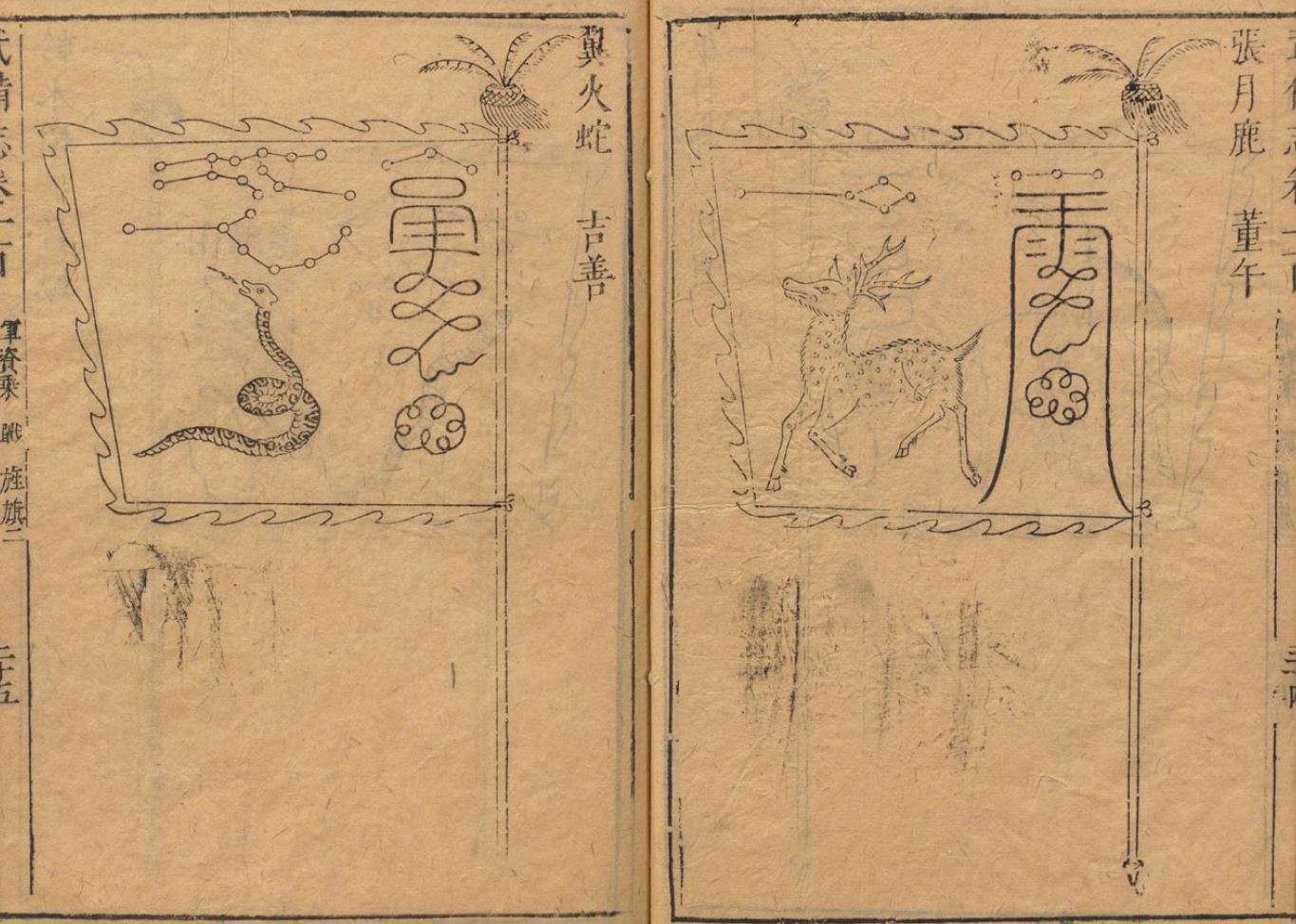

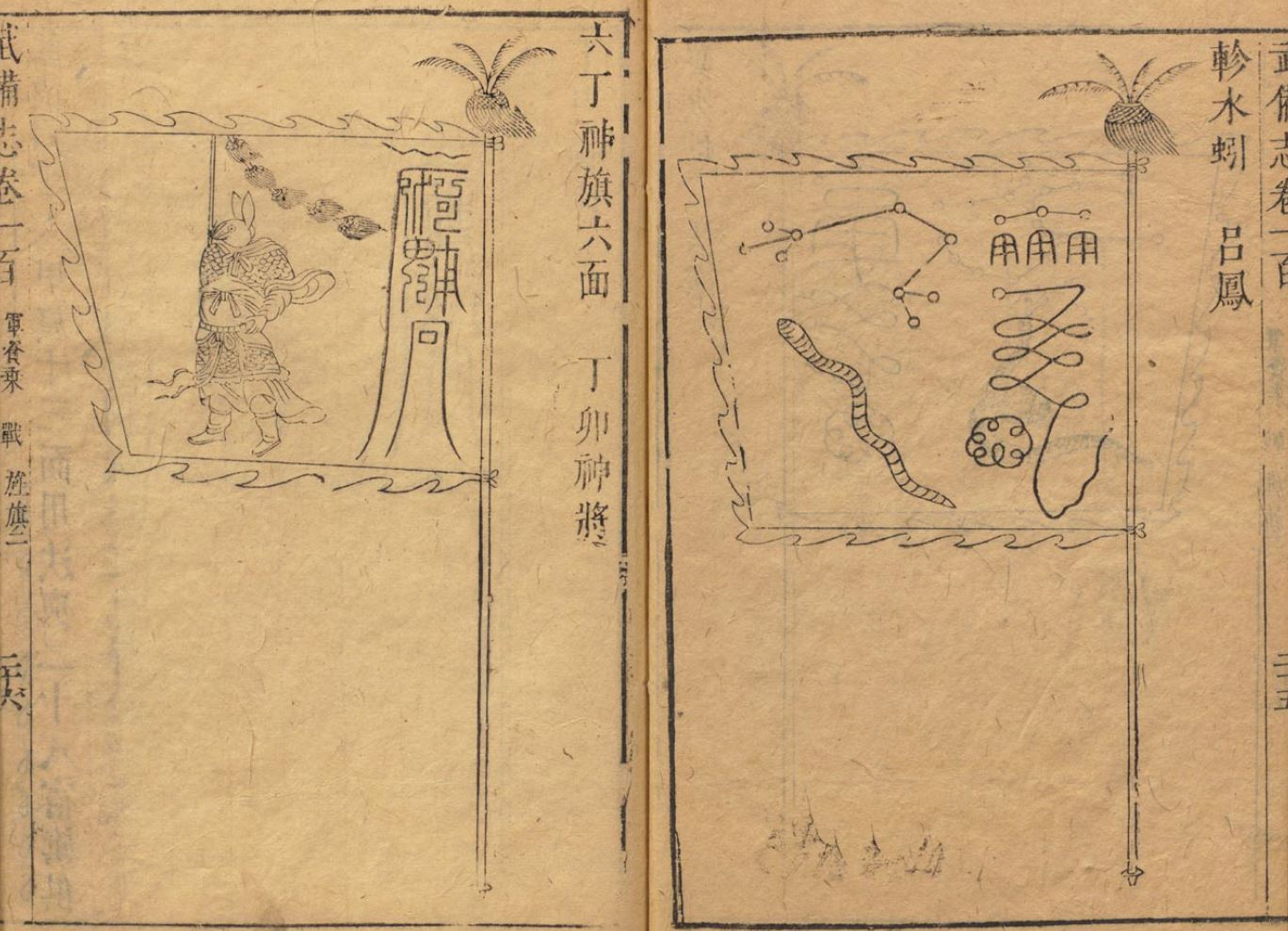

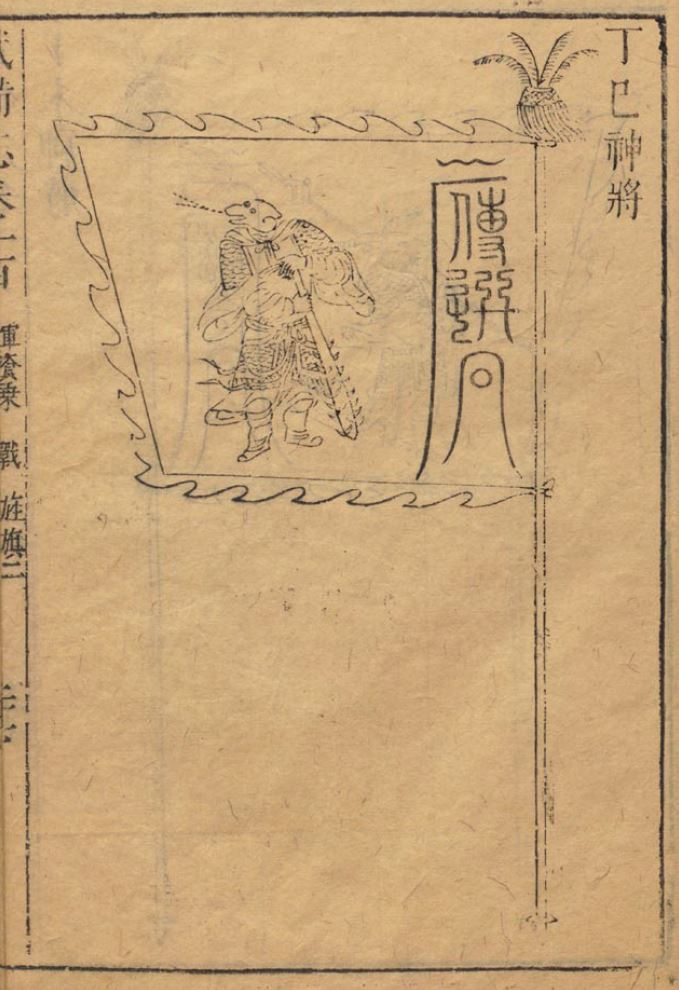

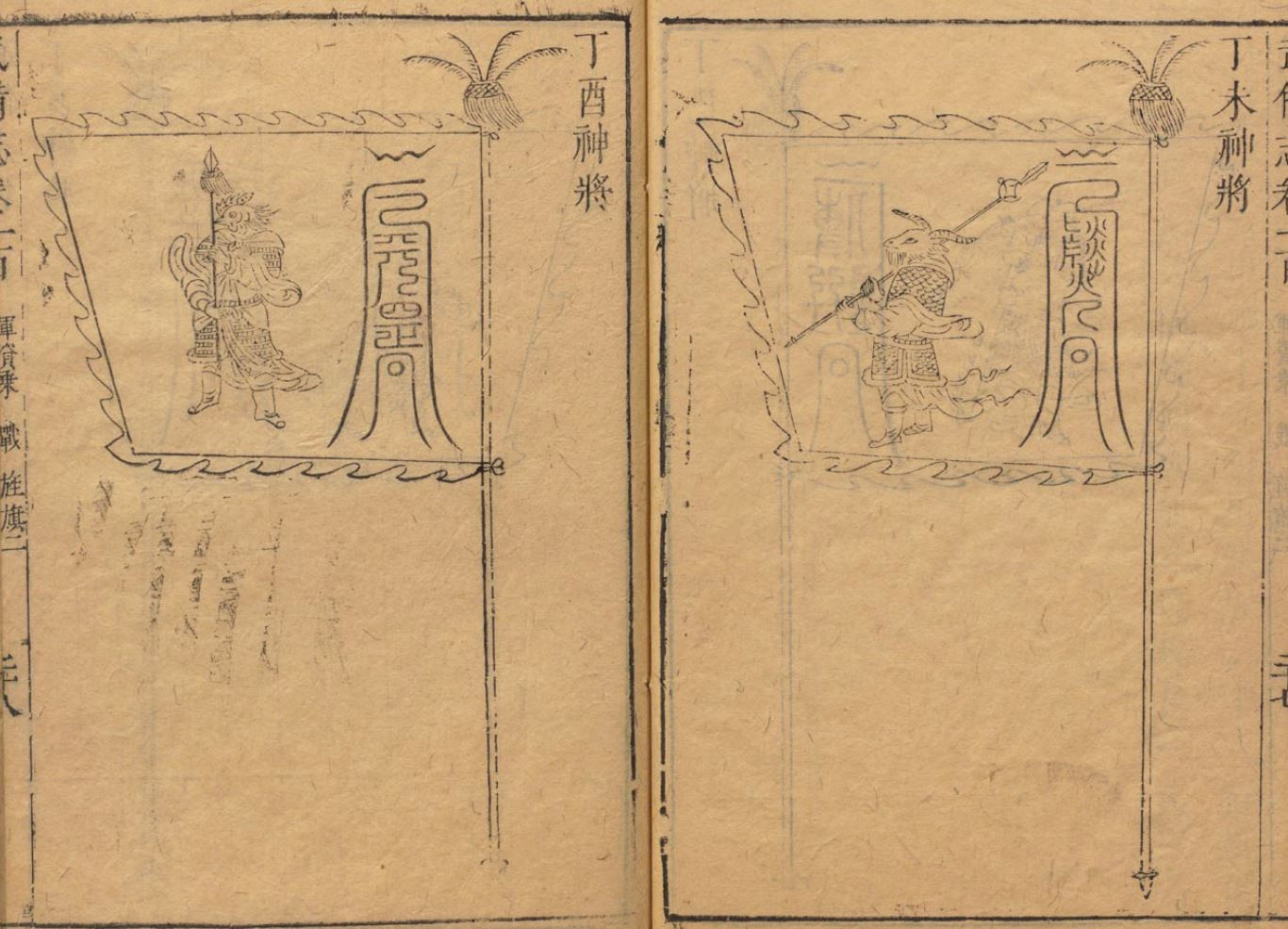

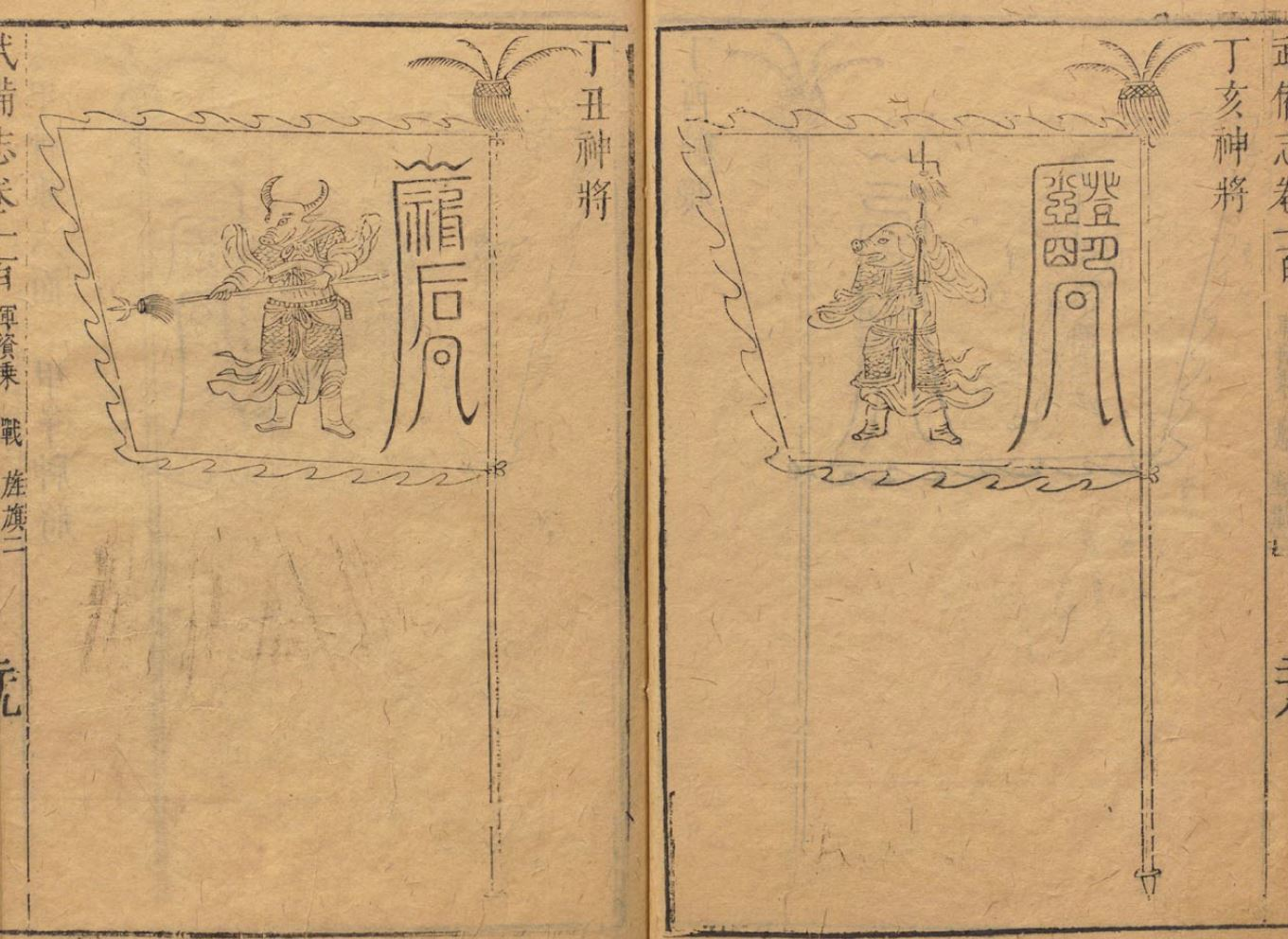

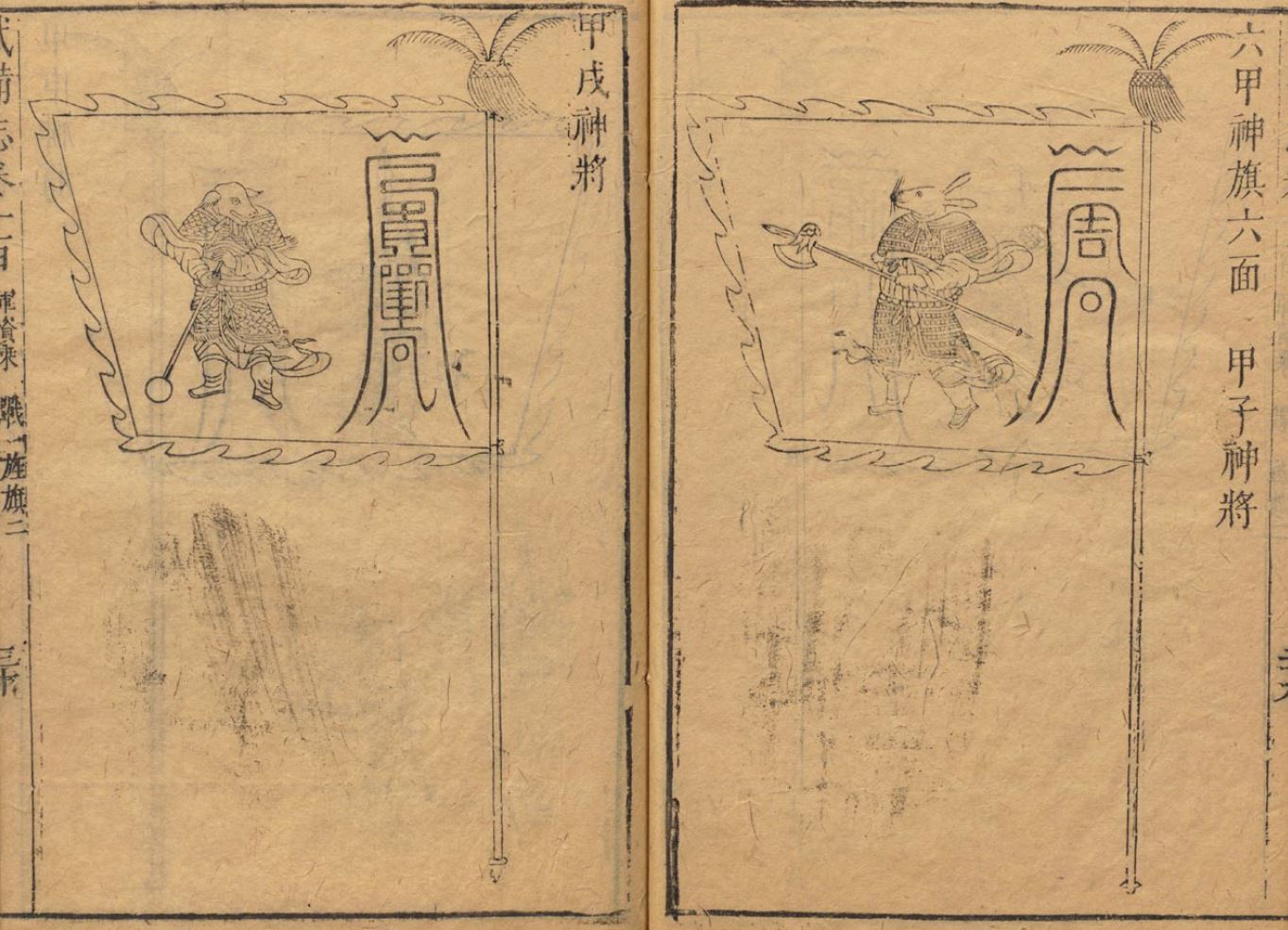

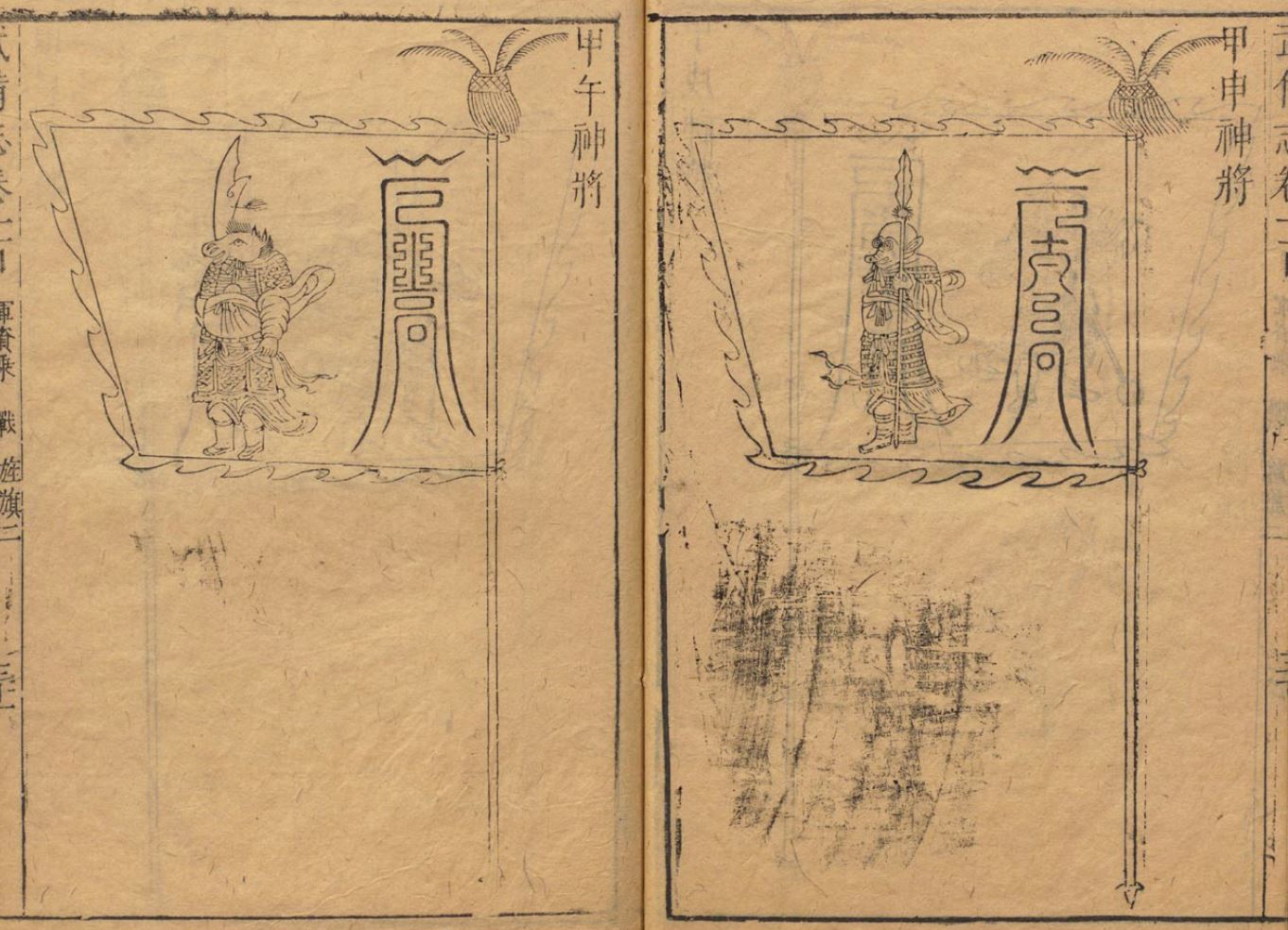

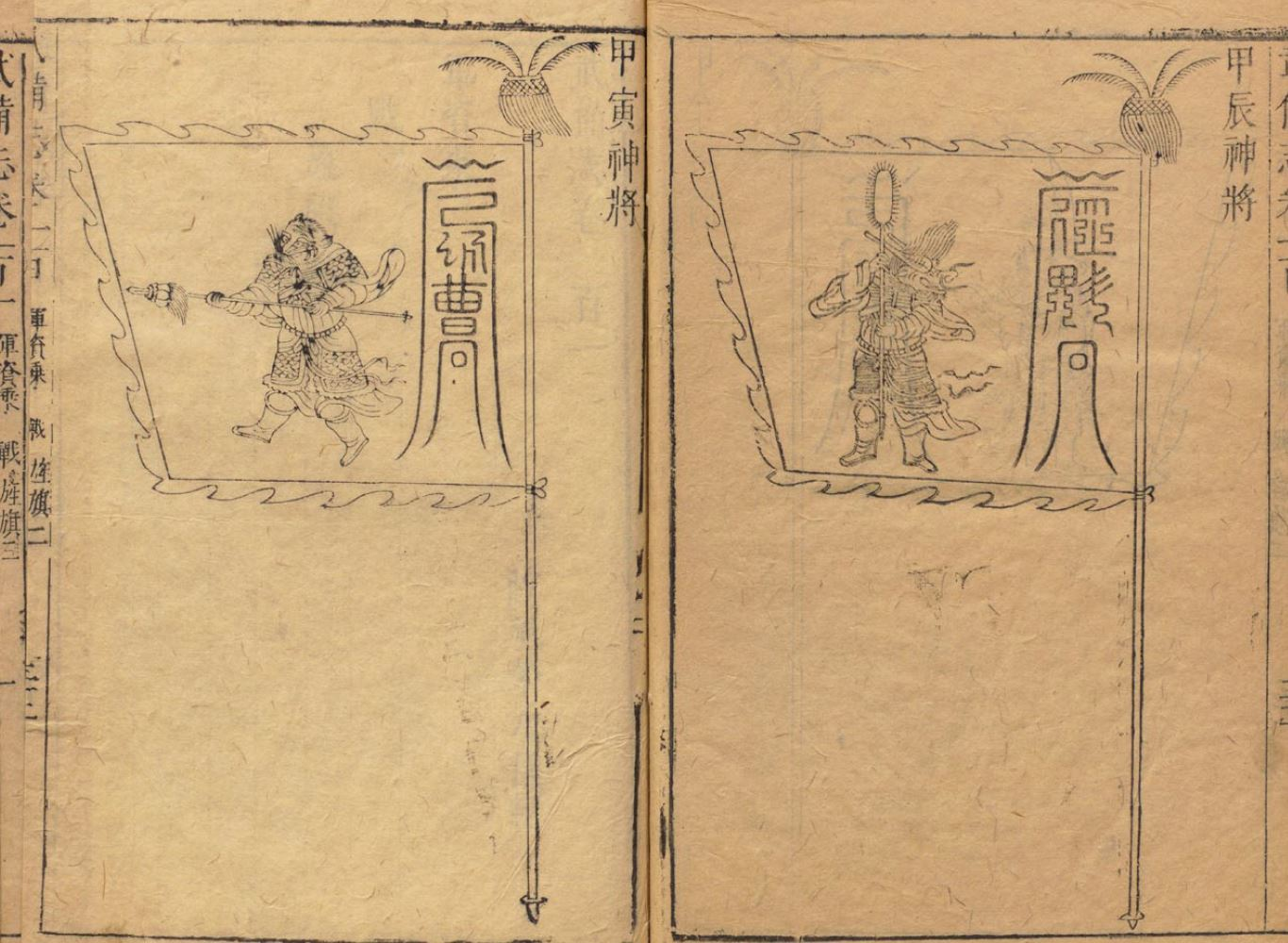

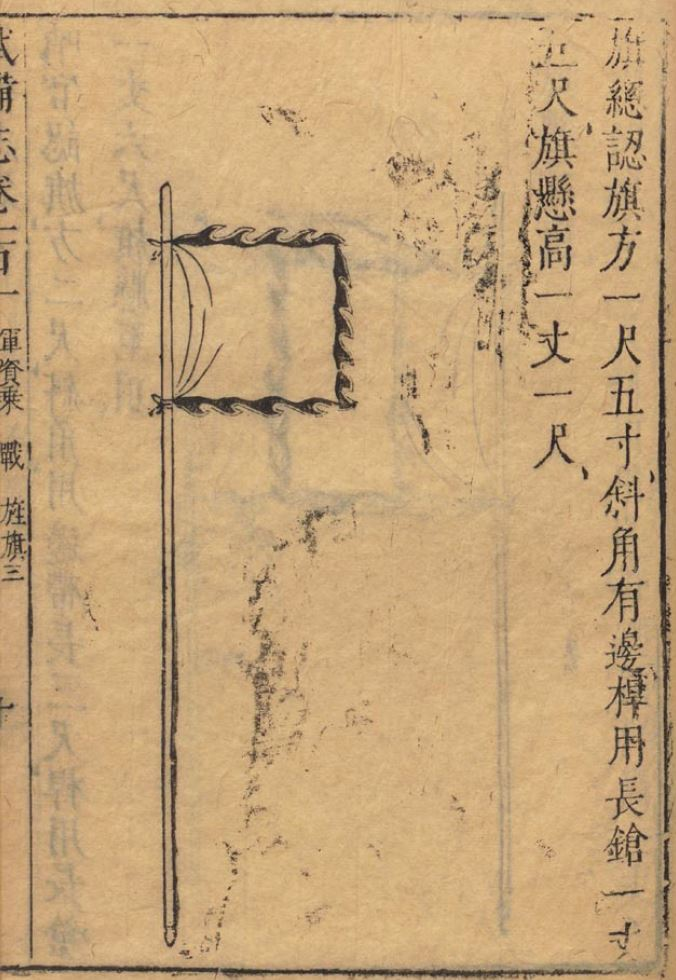

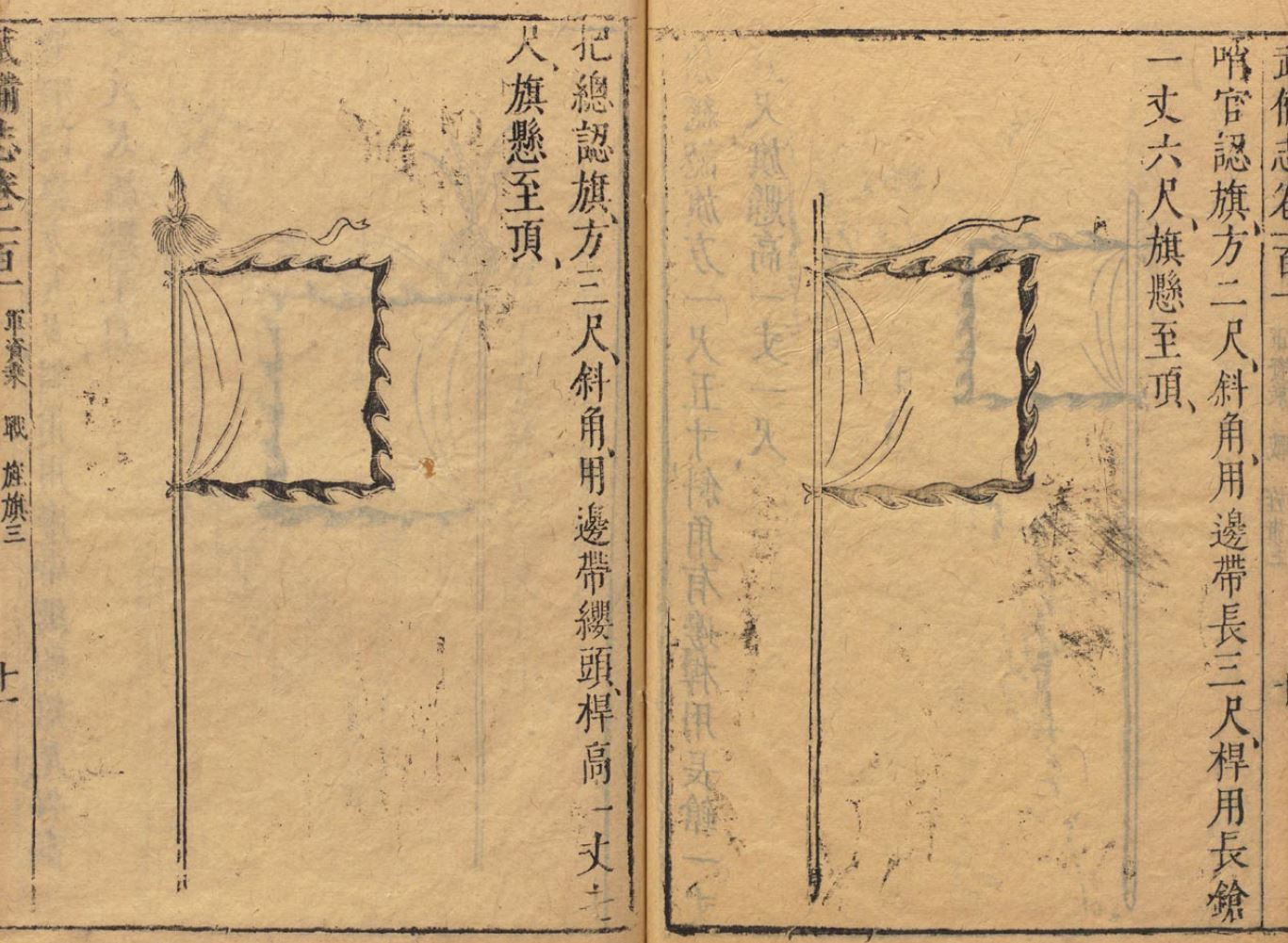

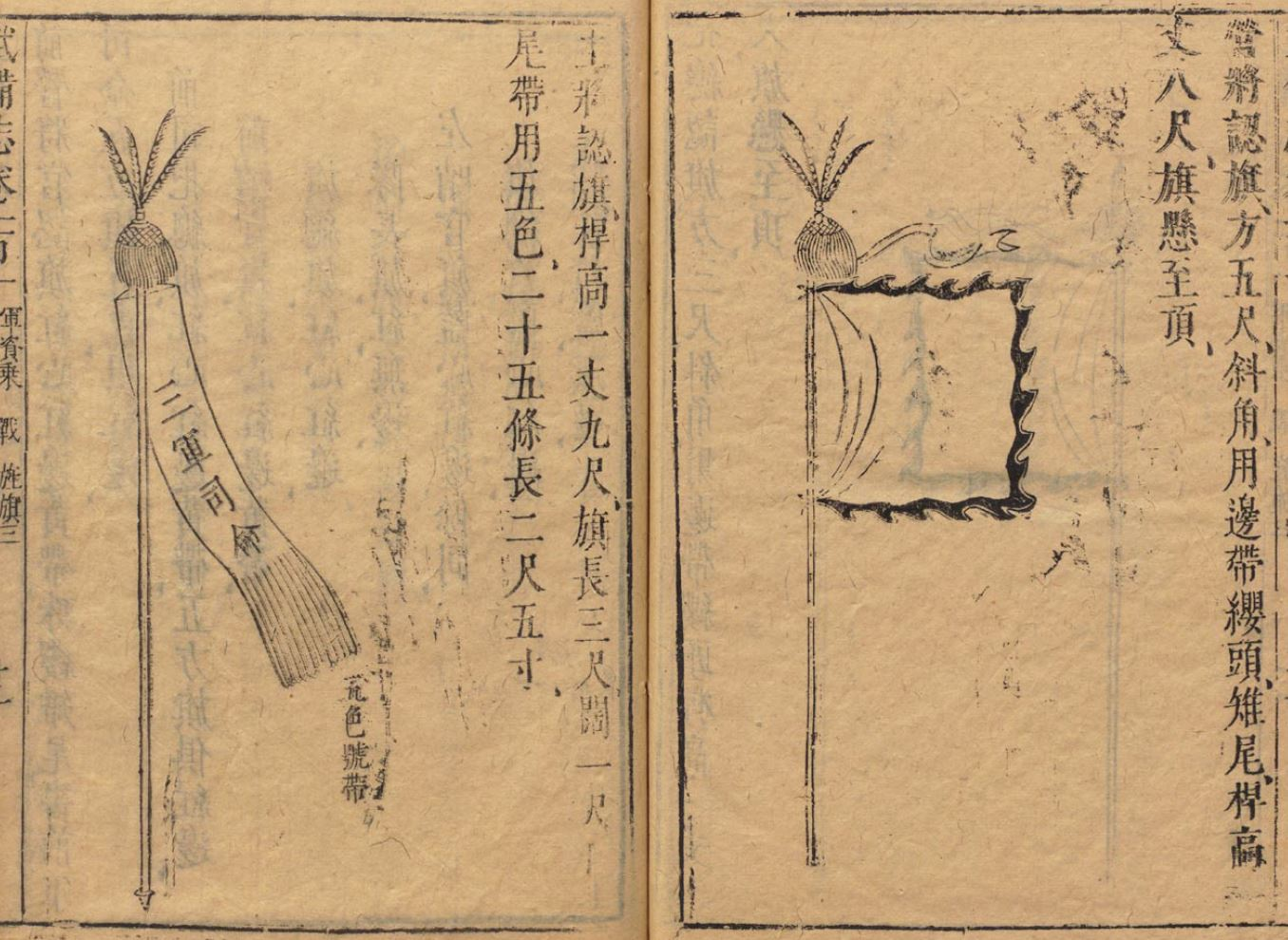

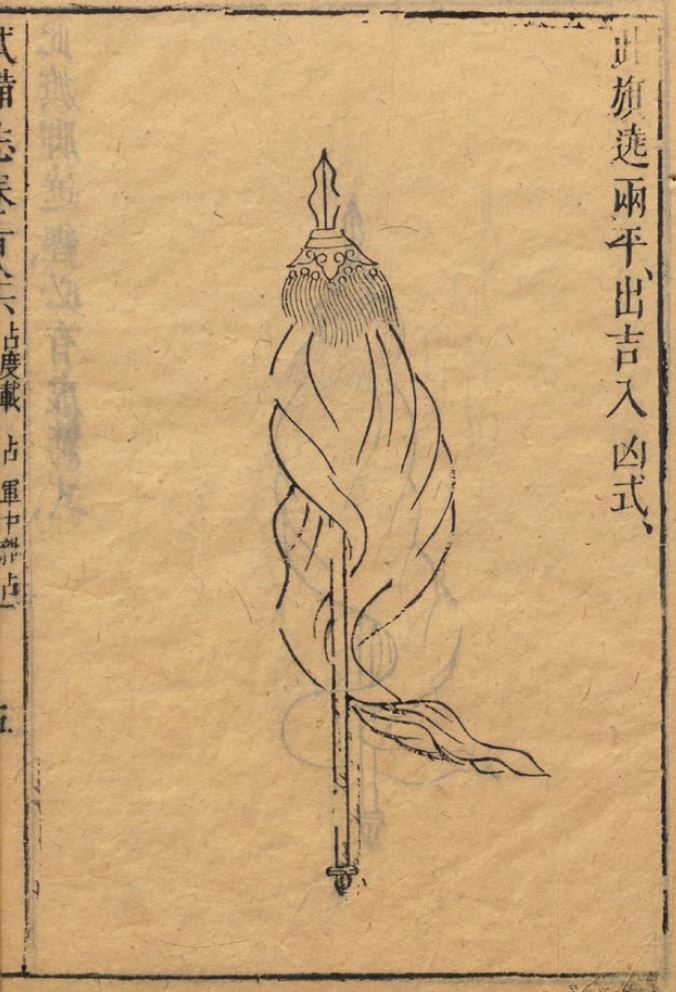

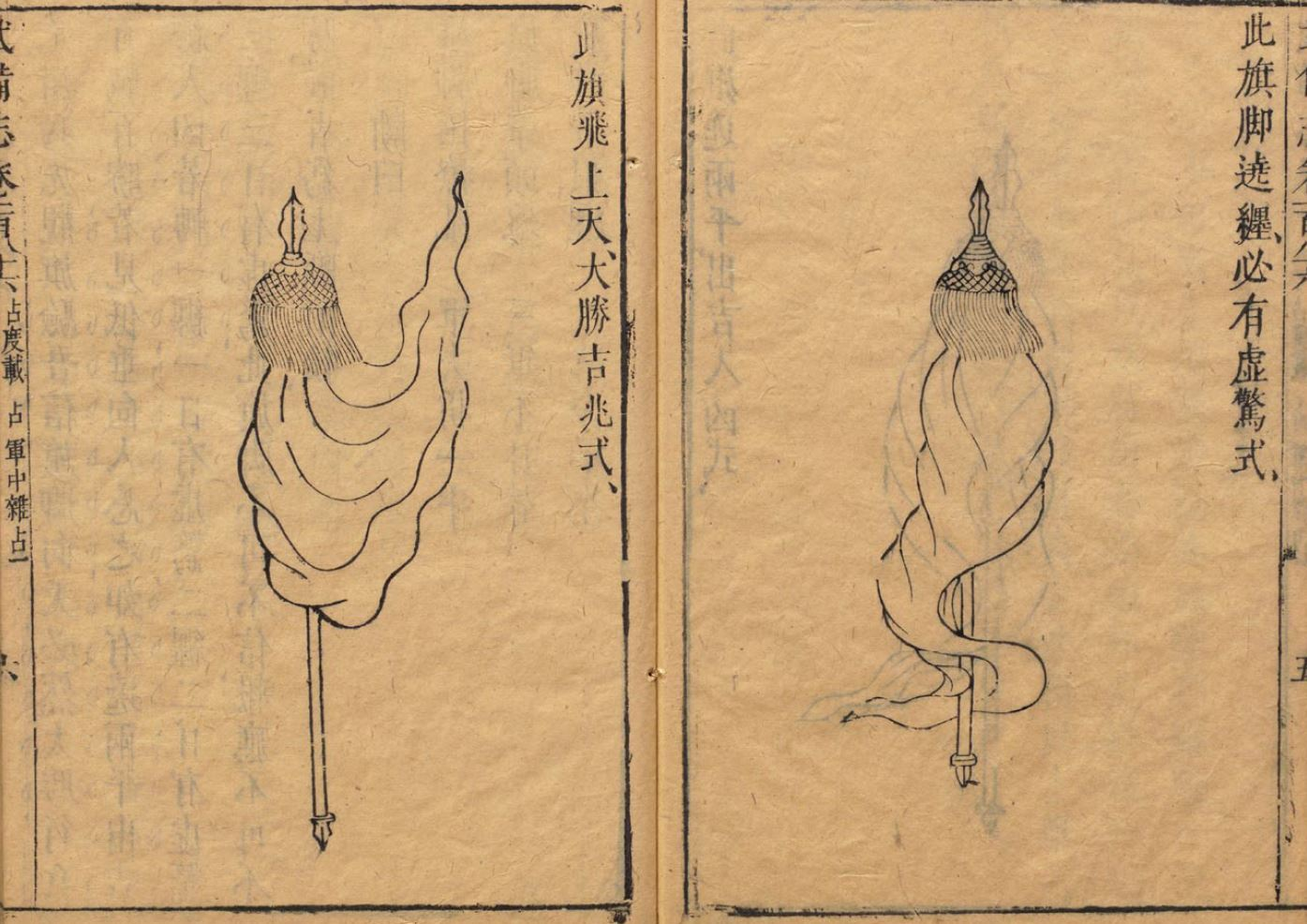

=== Paintings ===
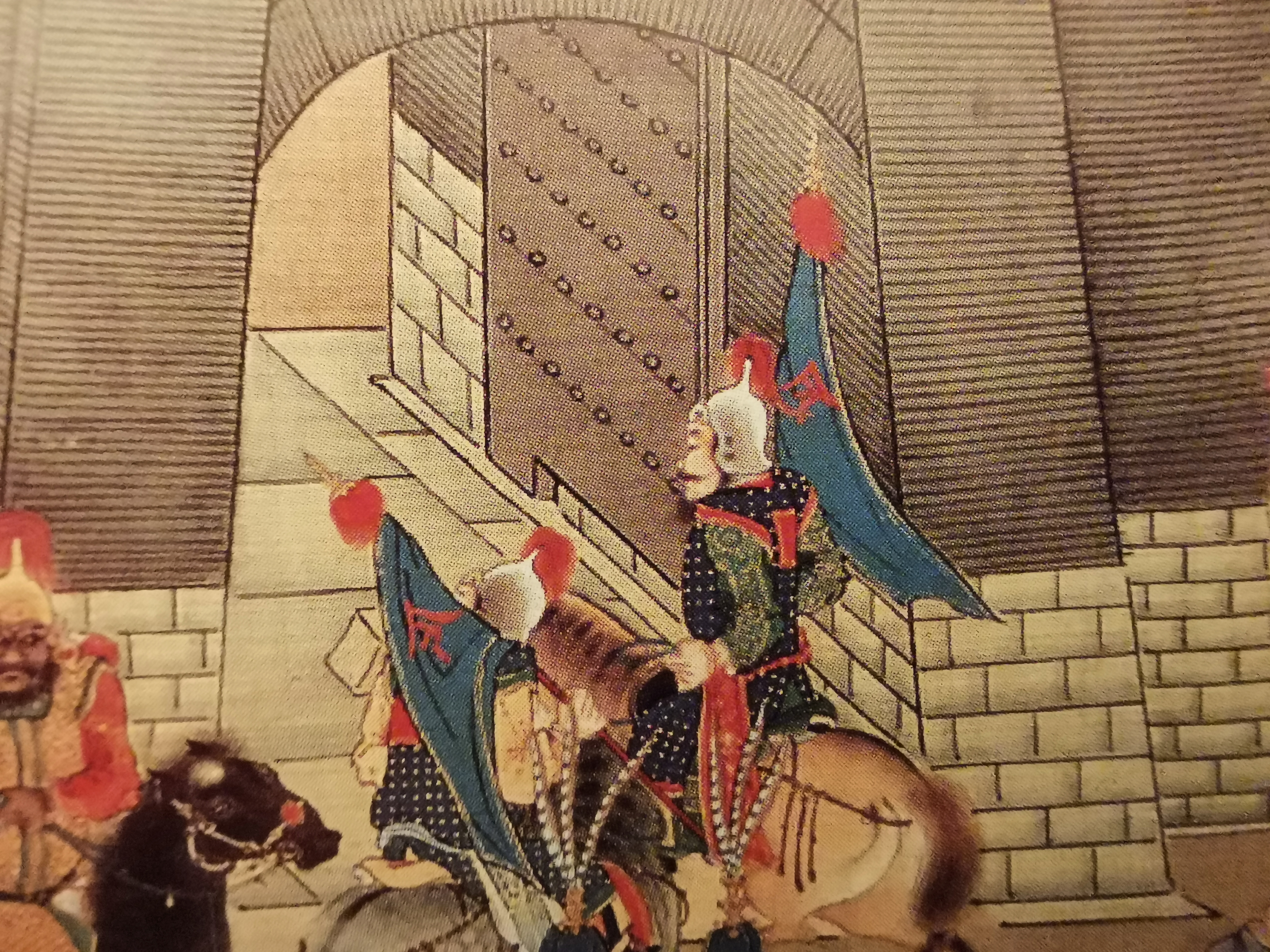

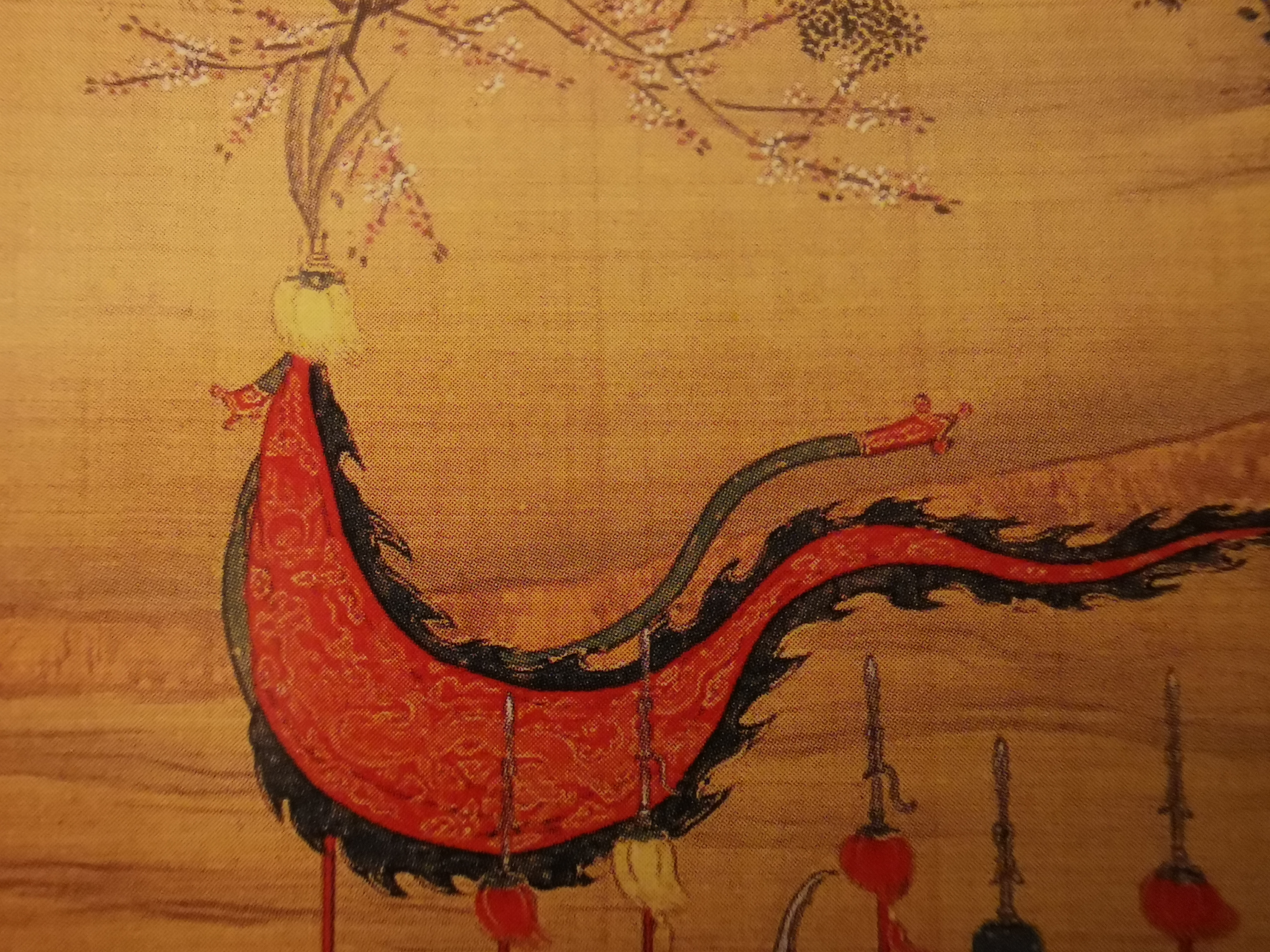

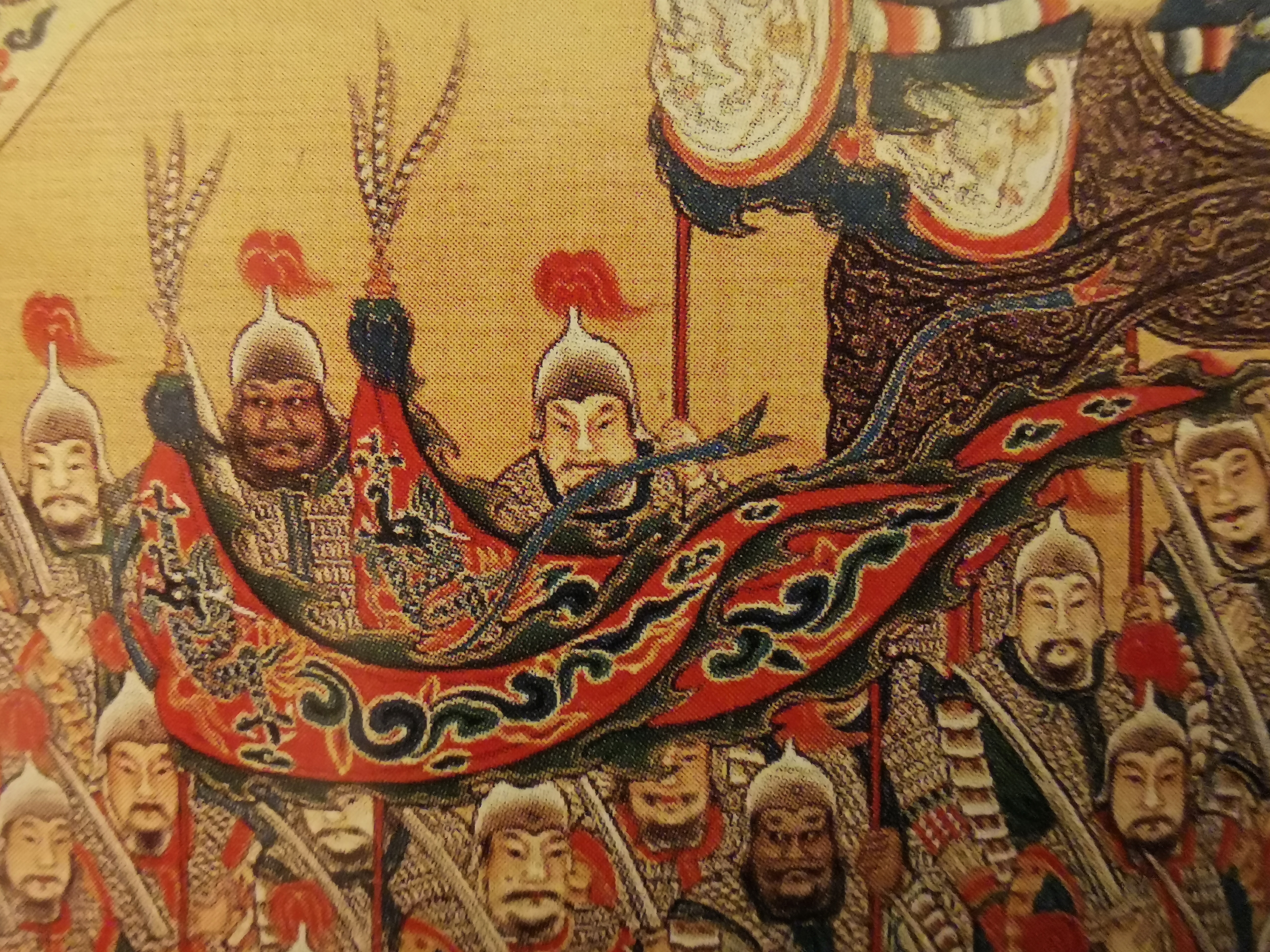

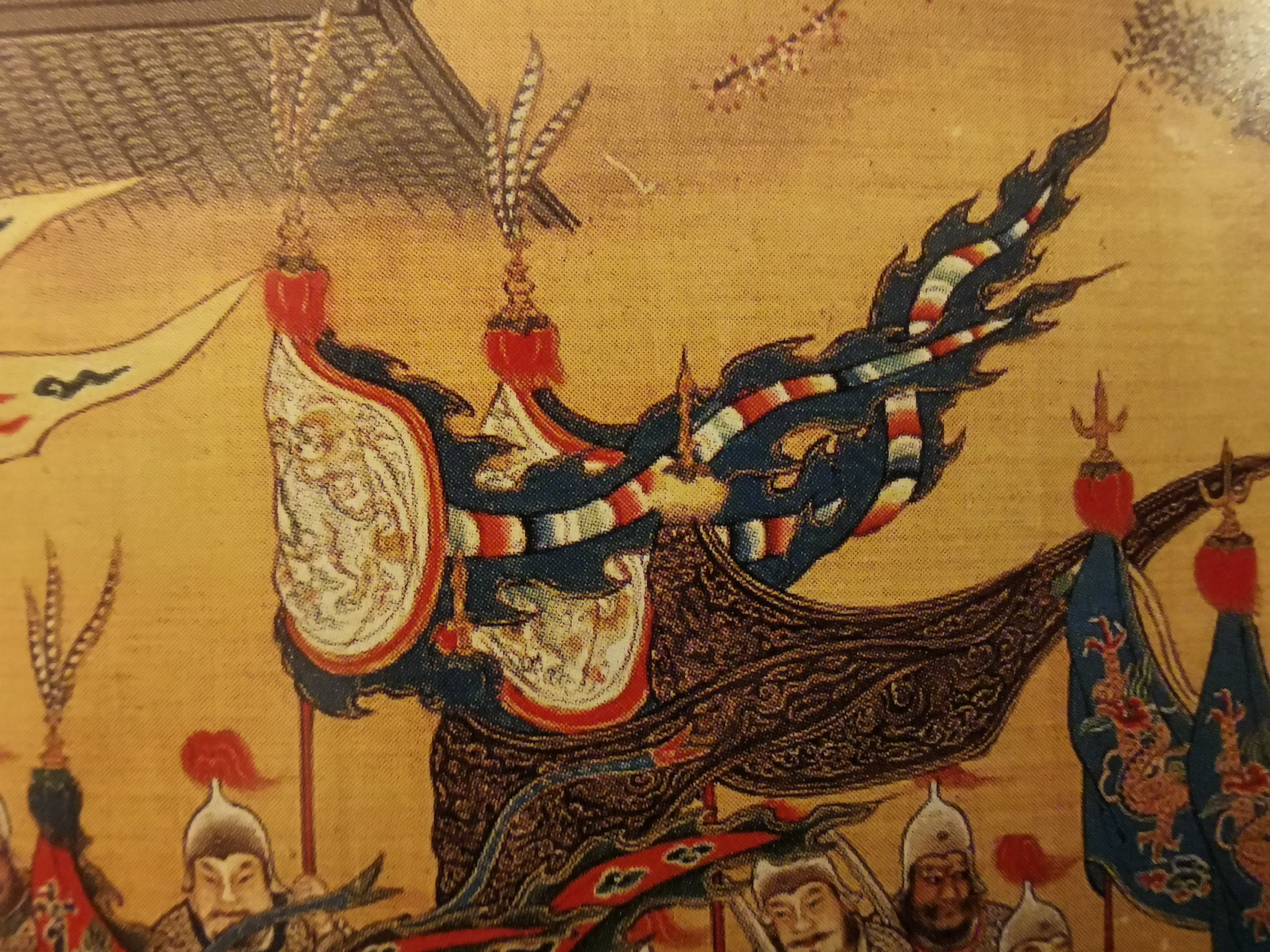

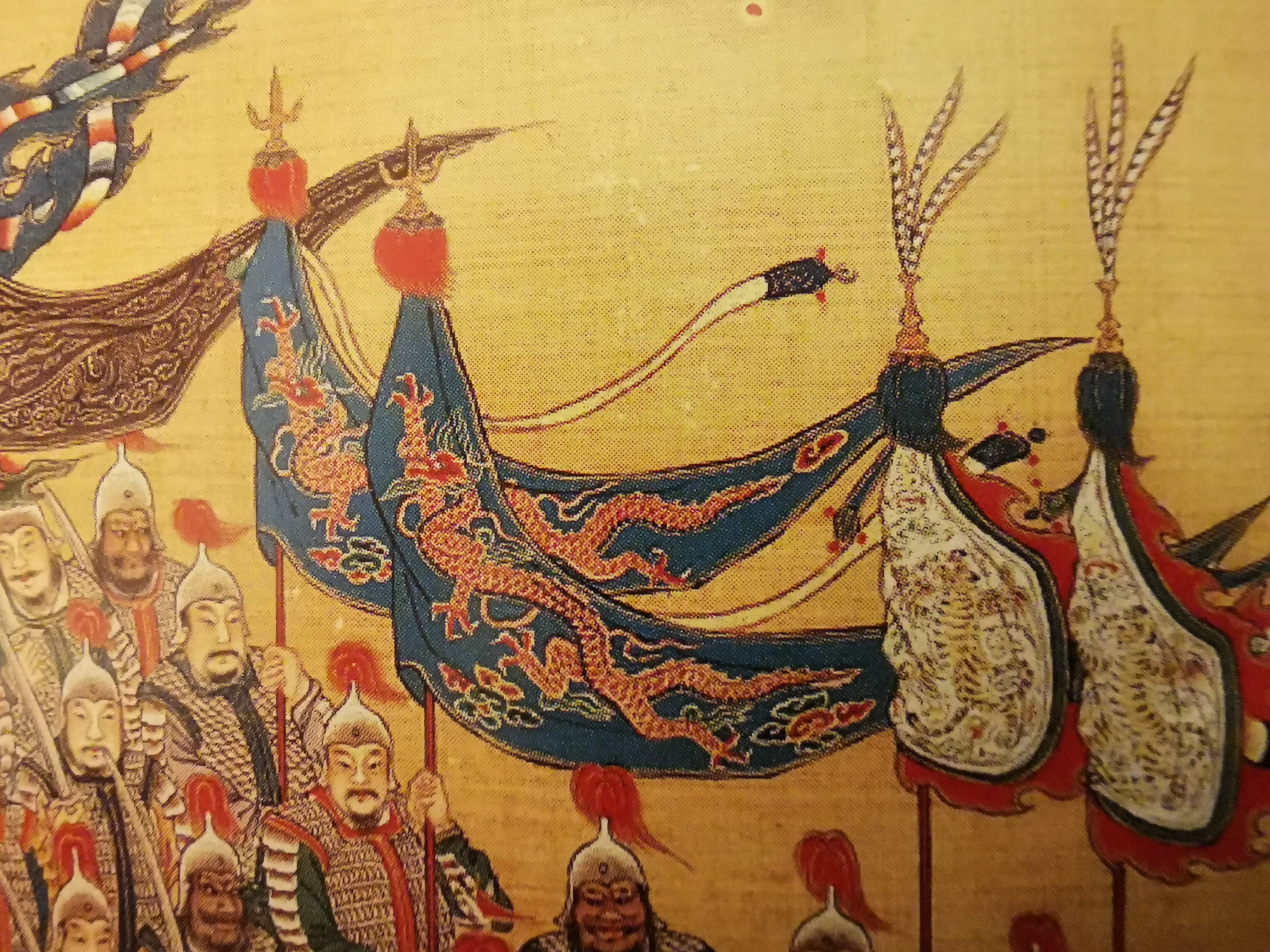

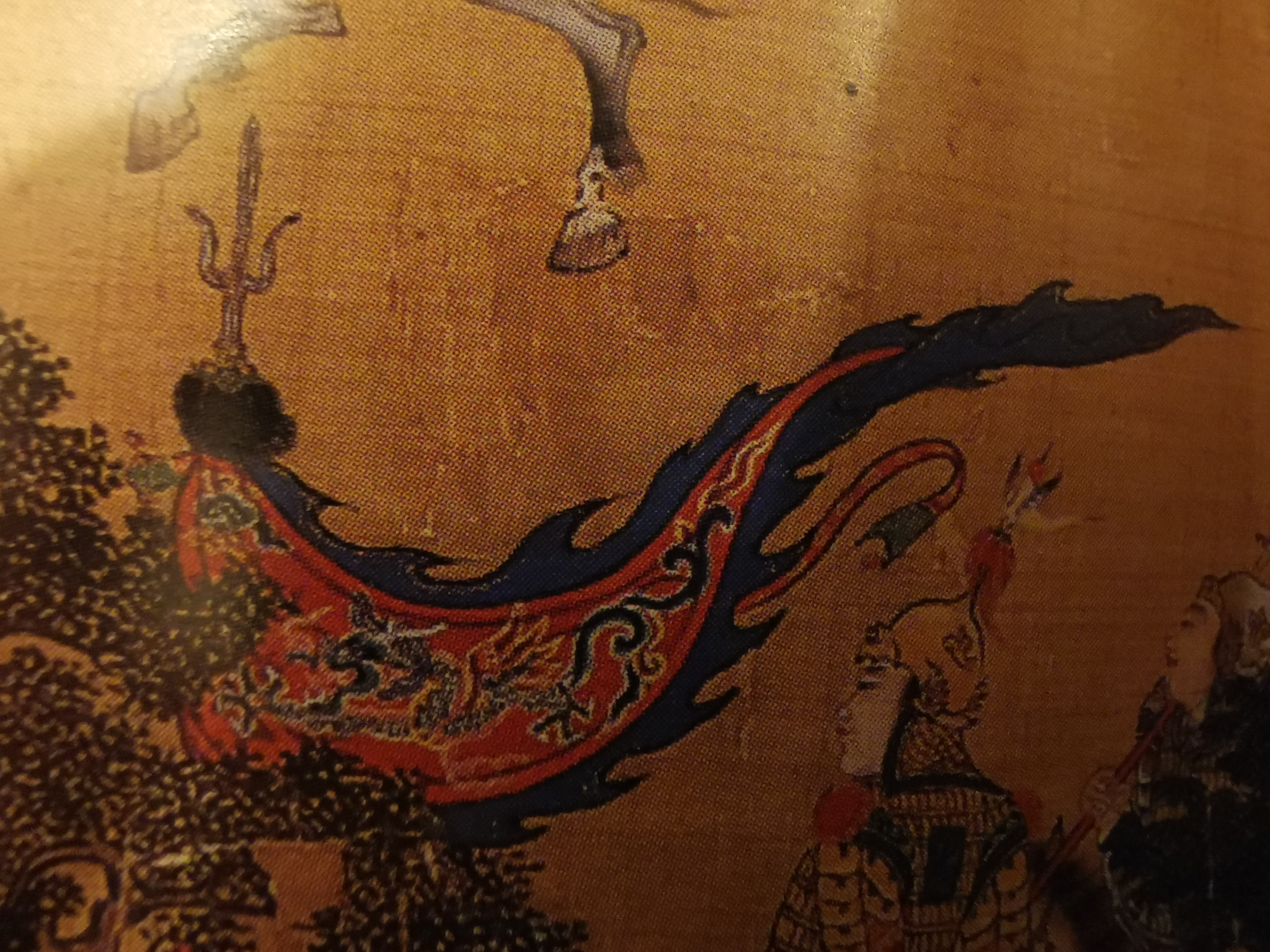

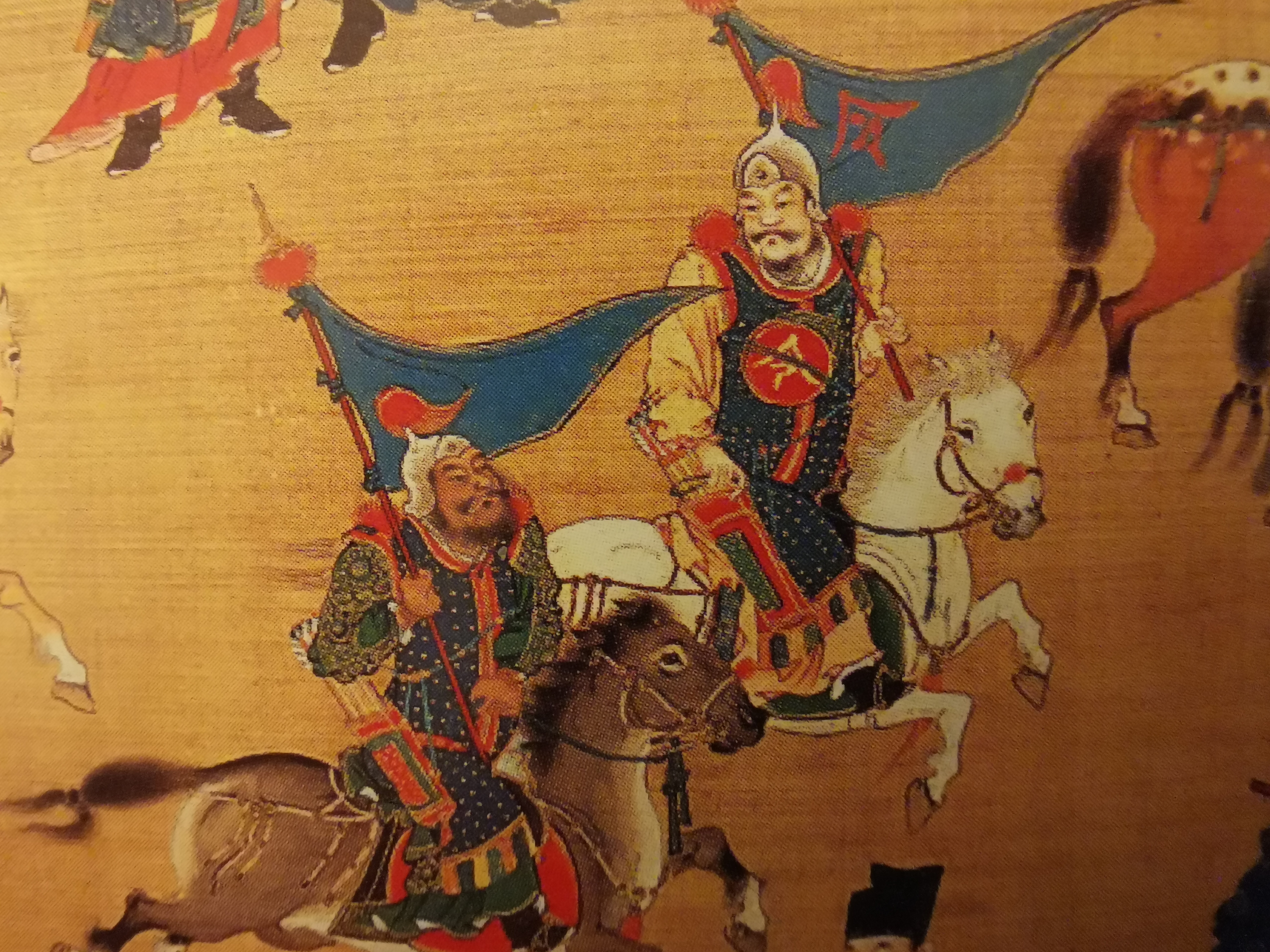

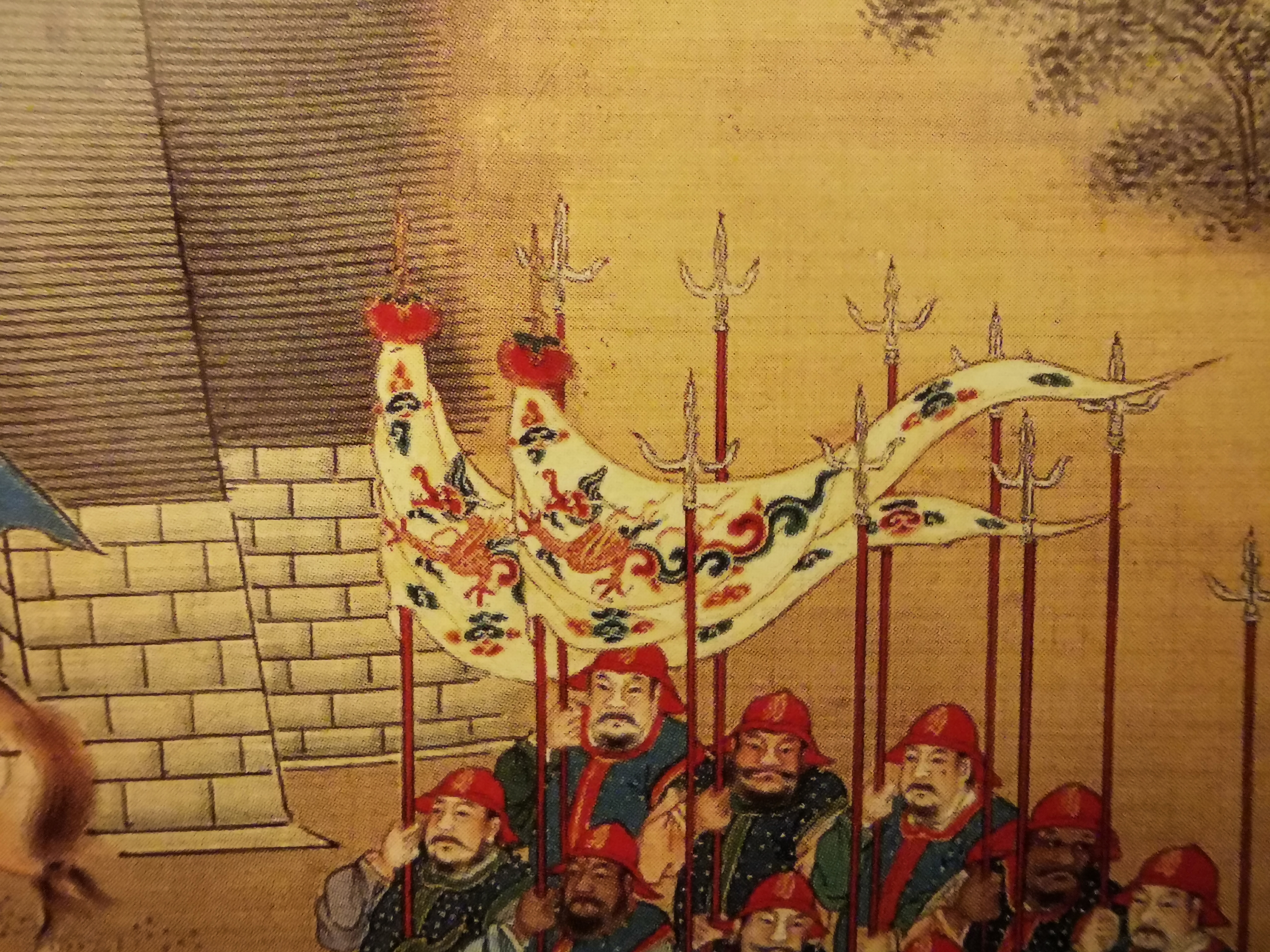

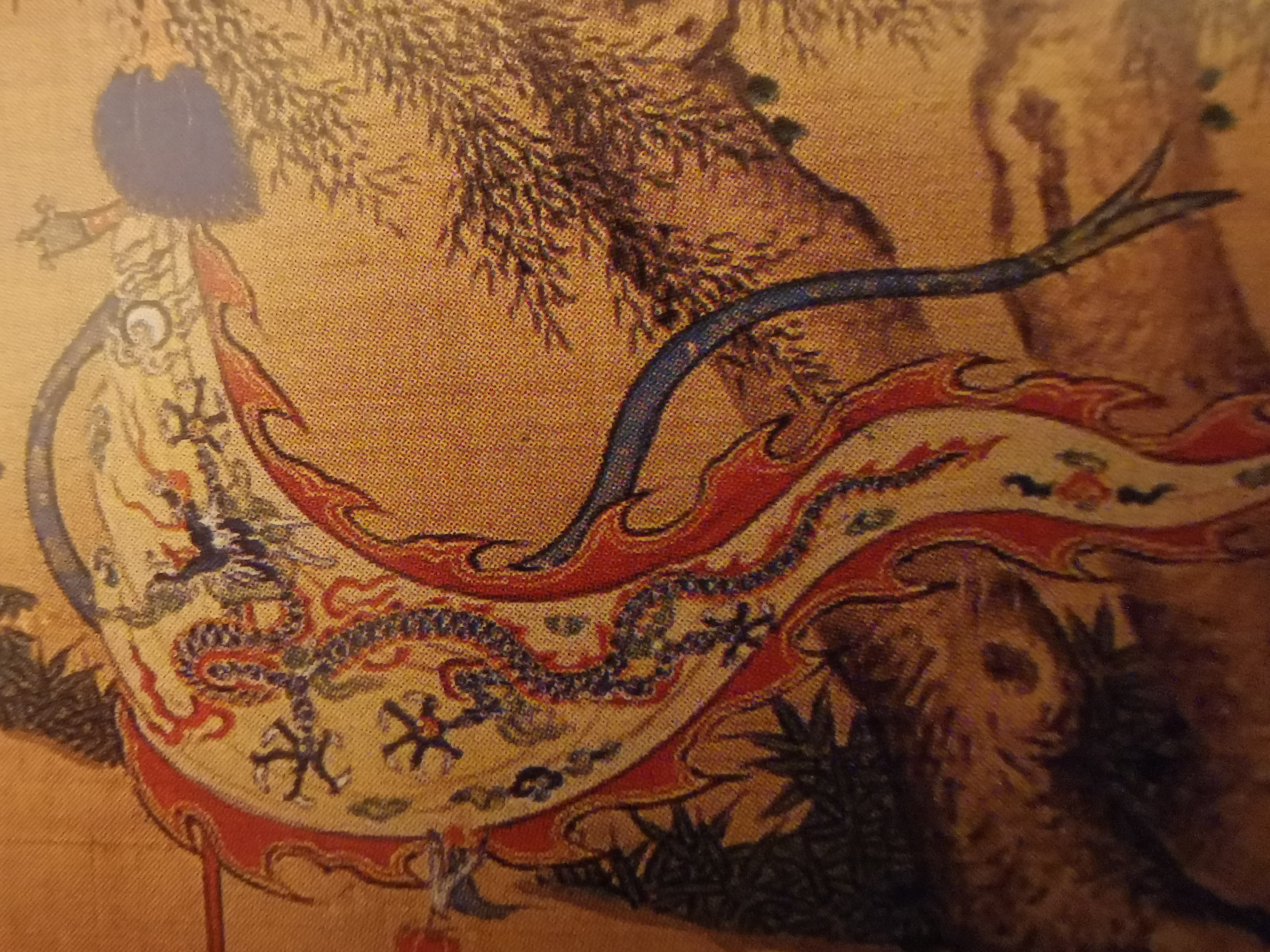

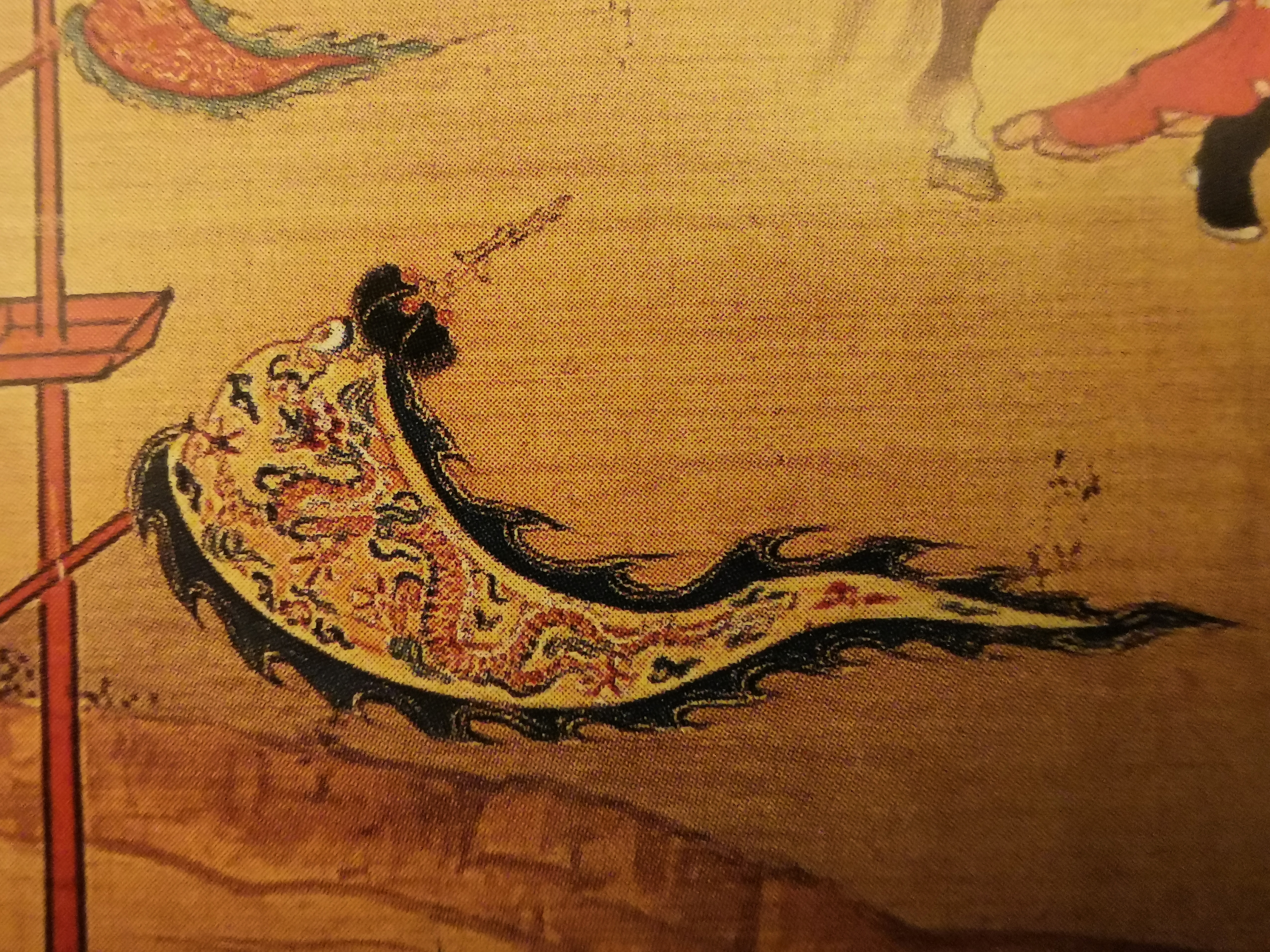

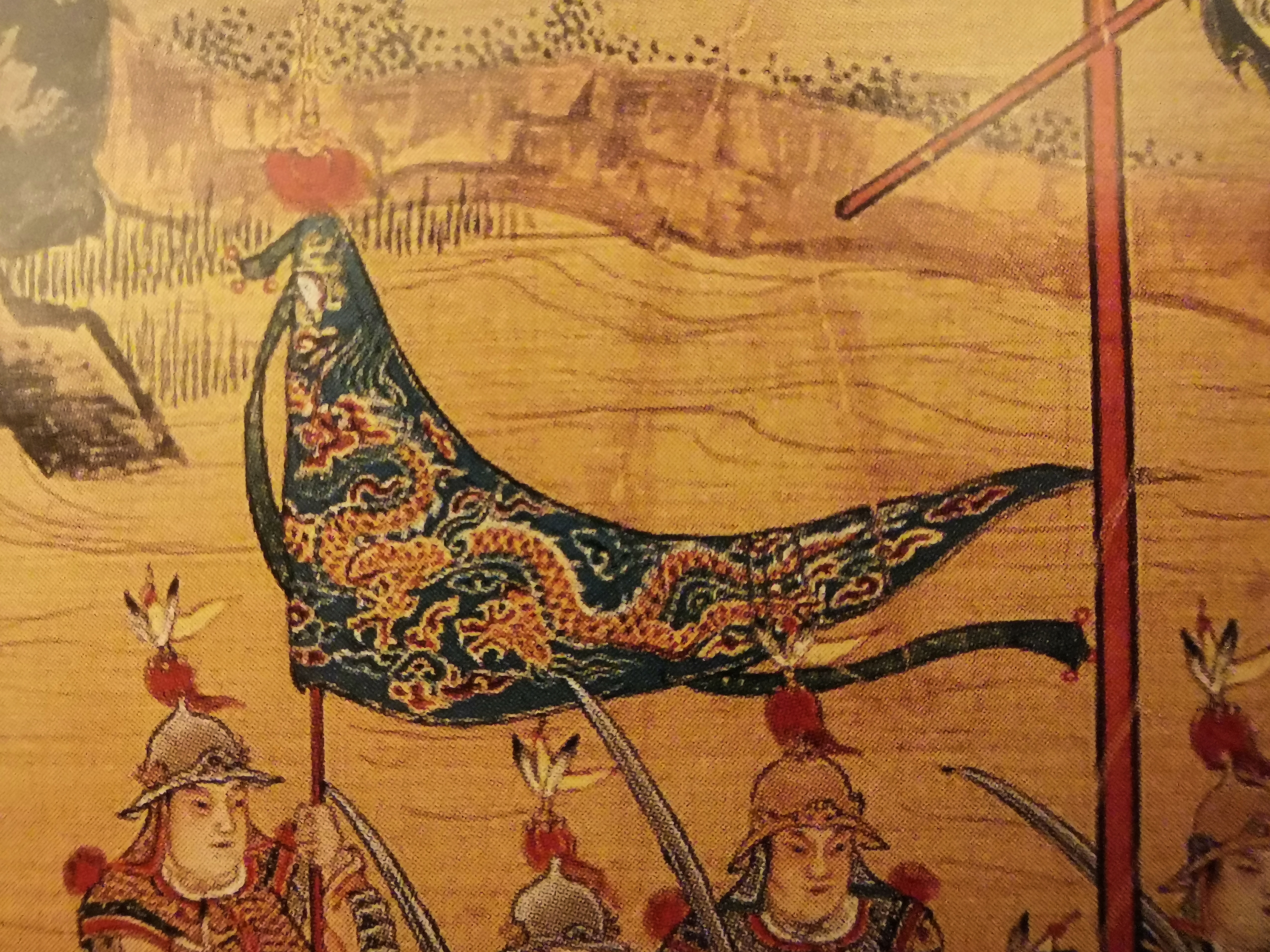

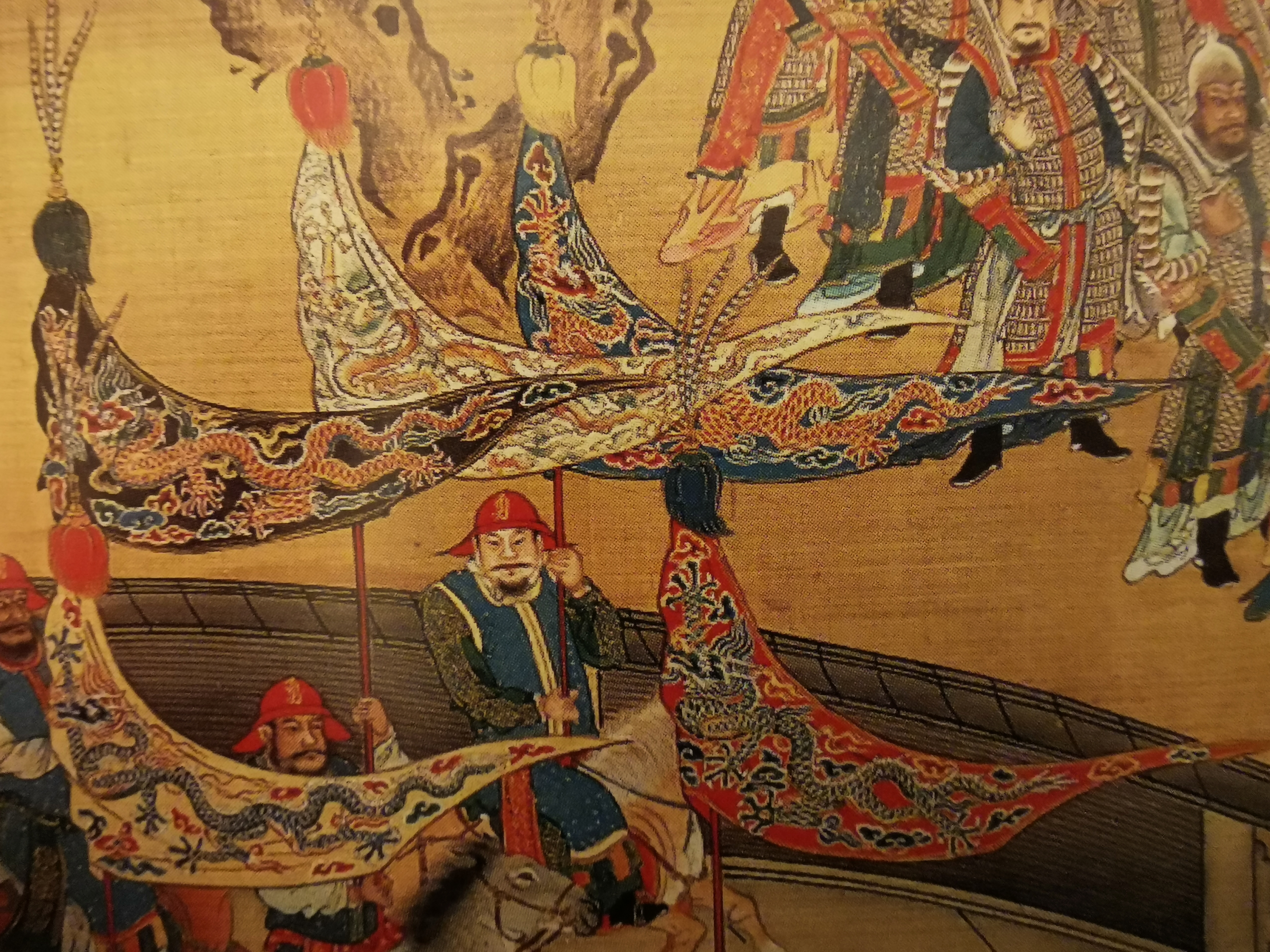

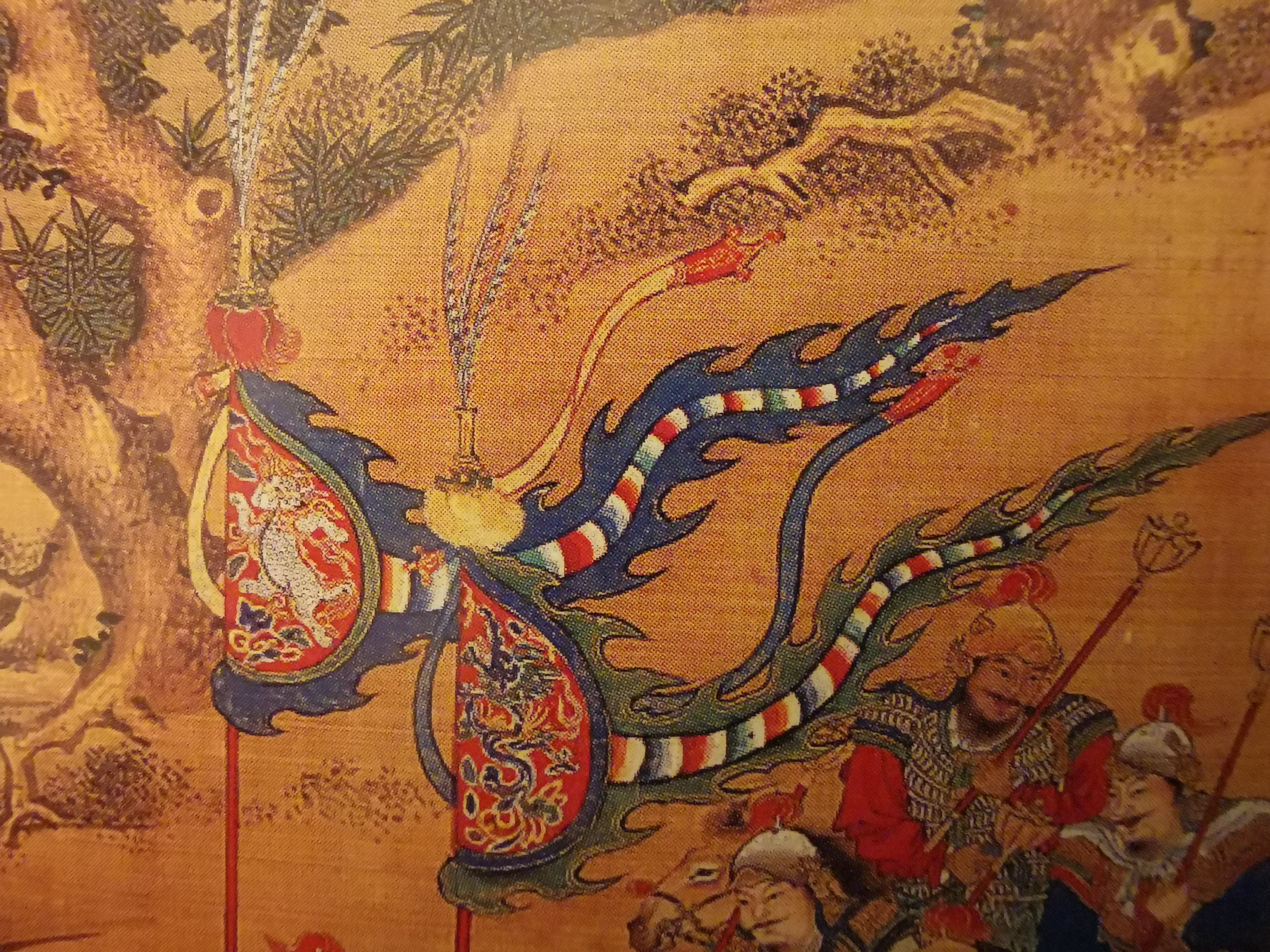

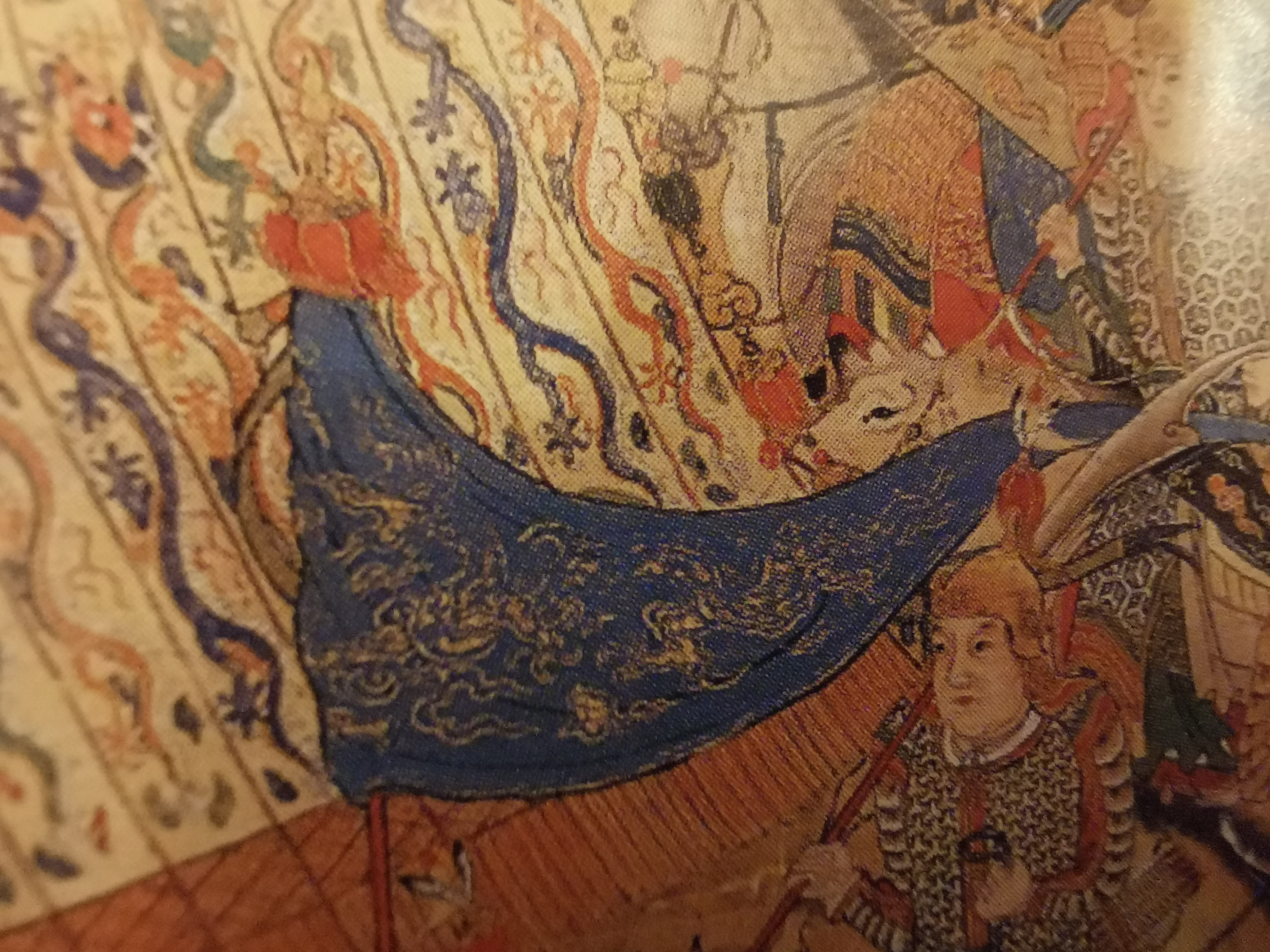

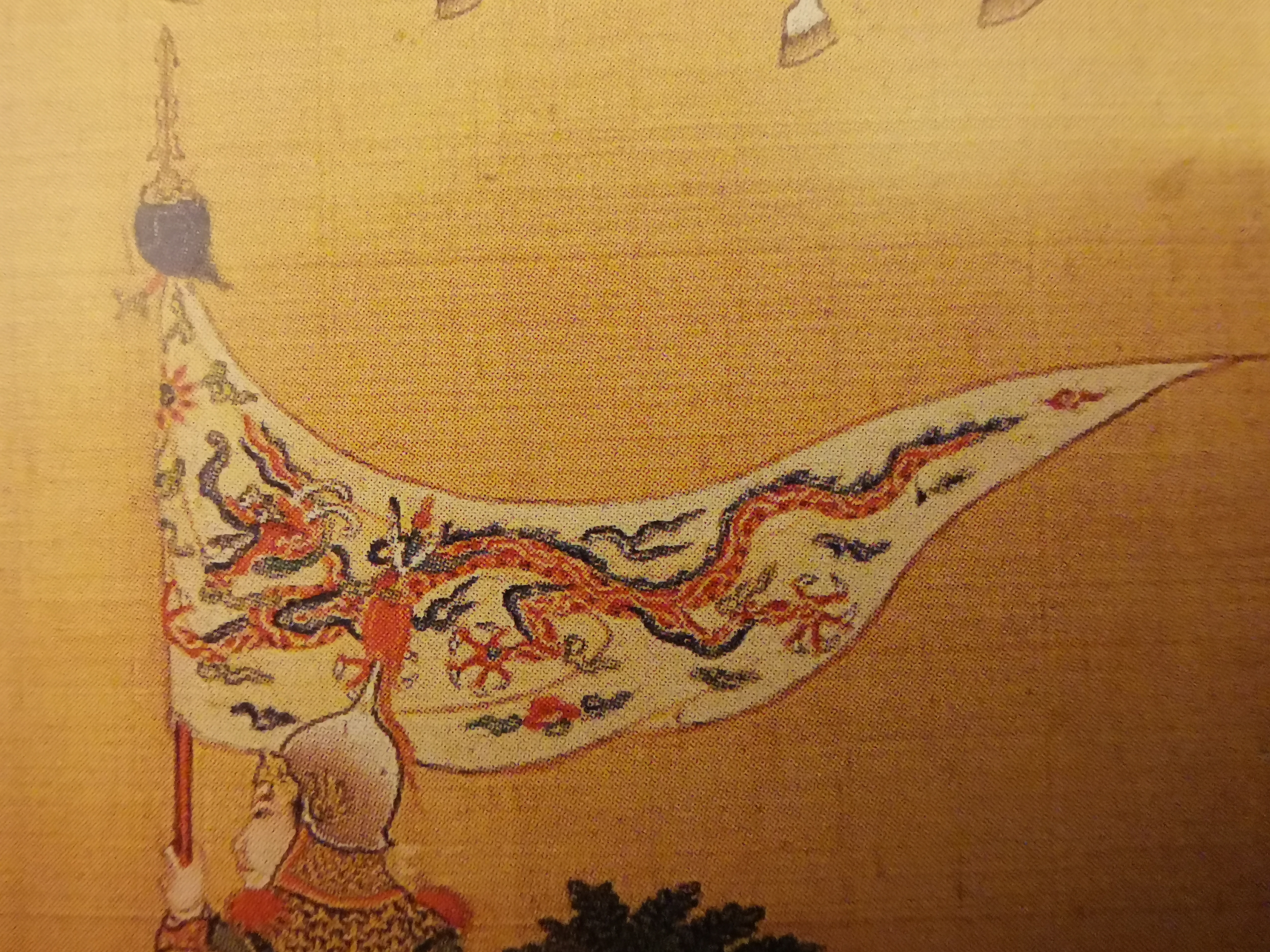

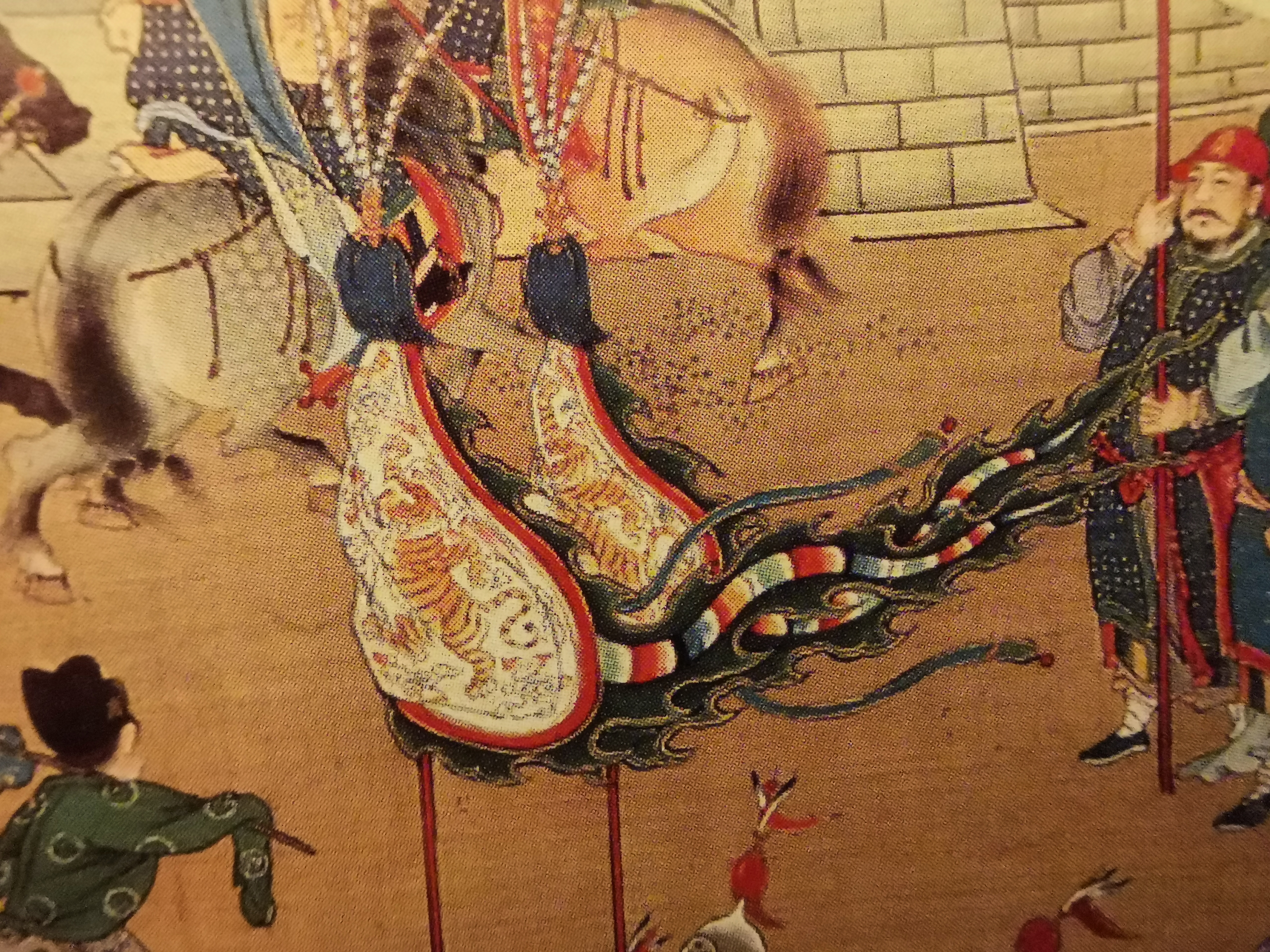

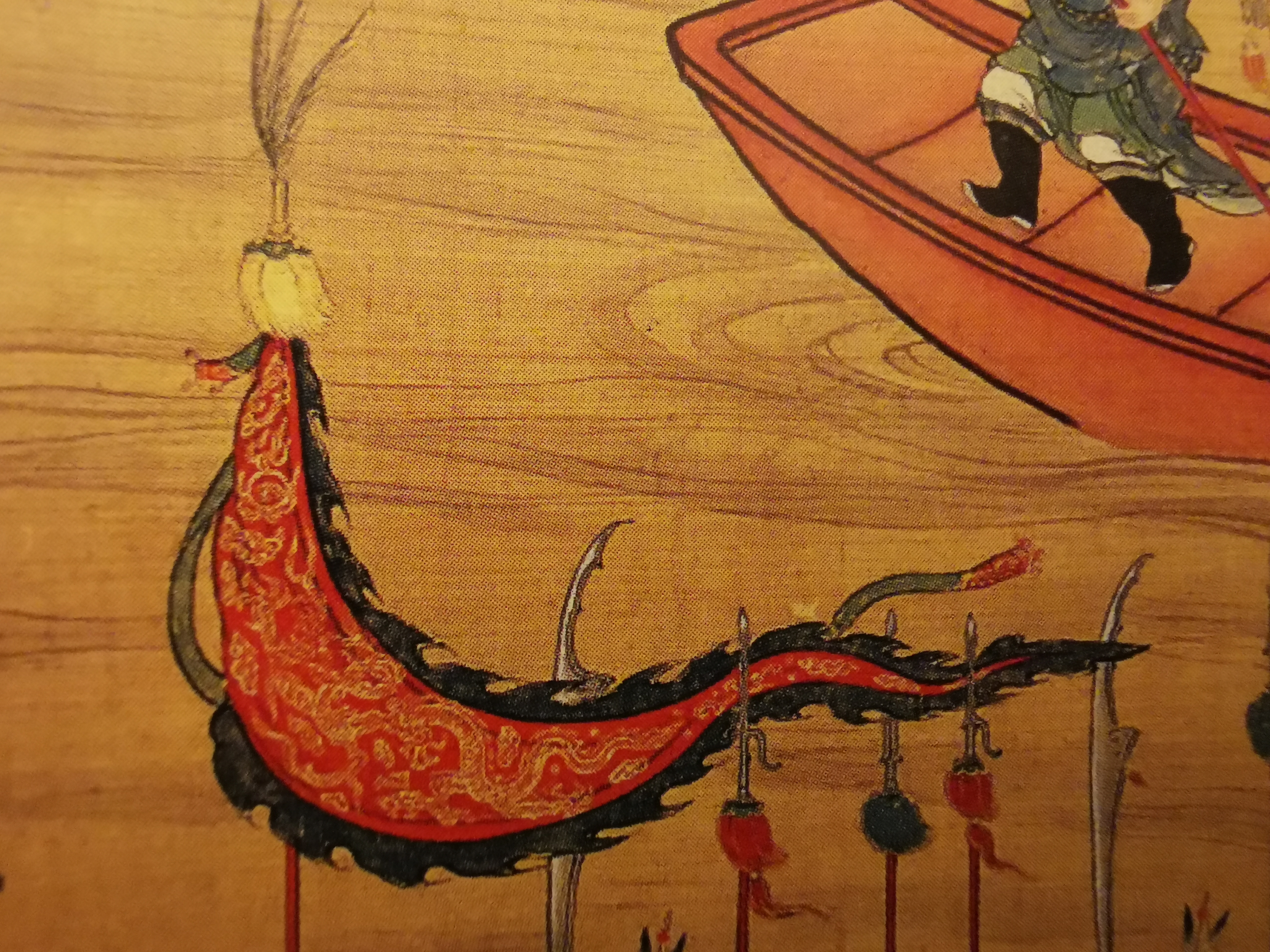

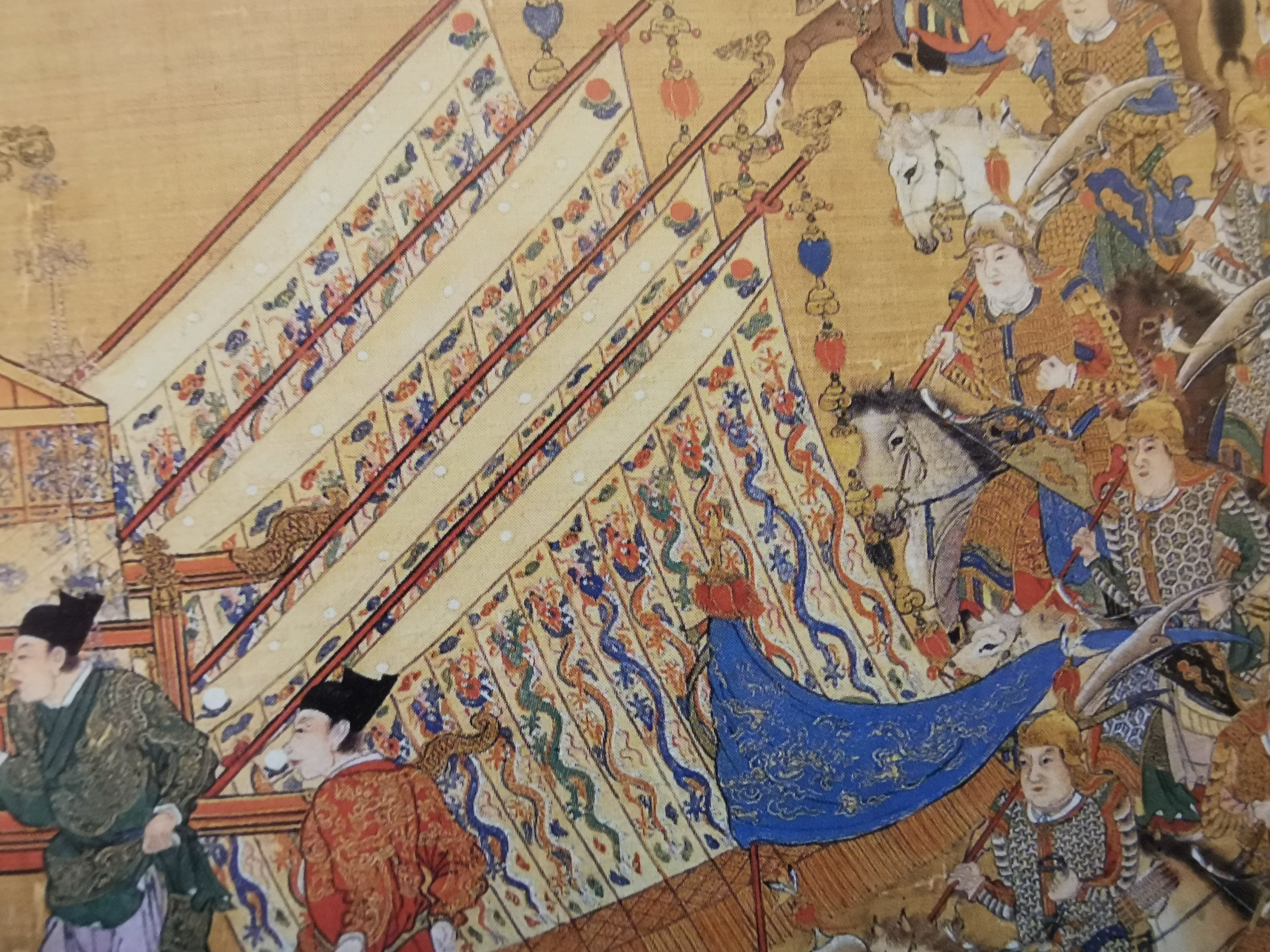

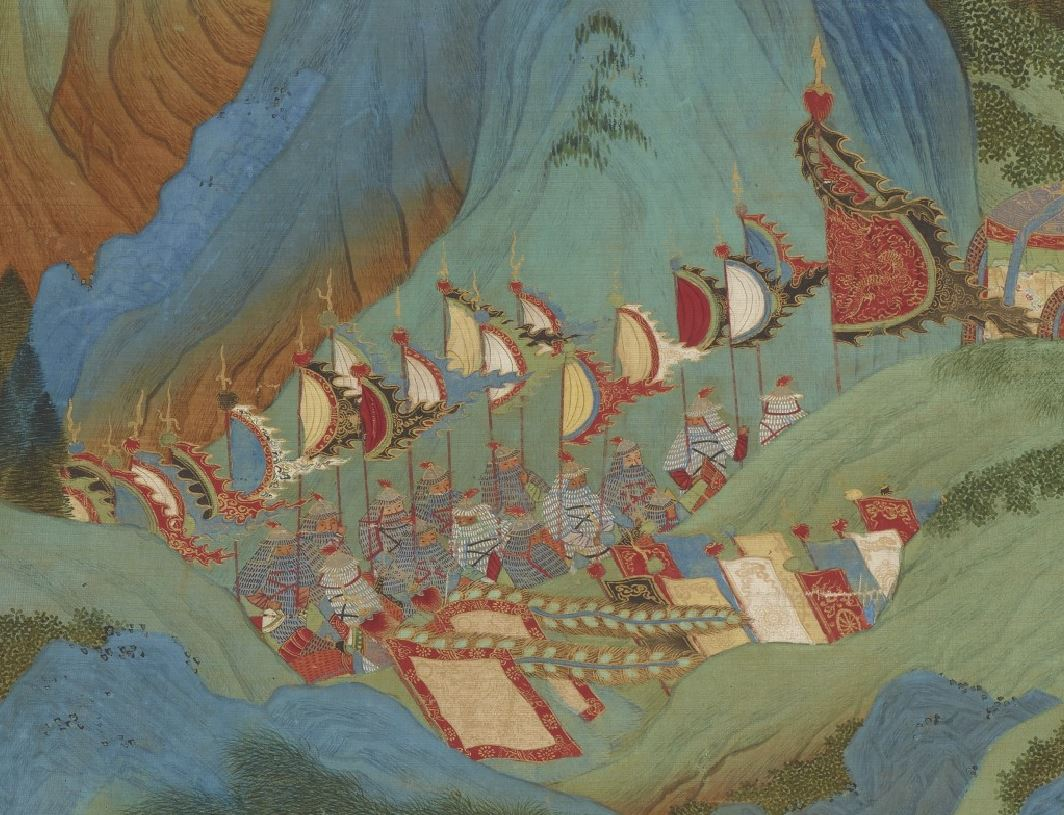

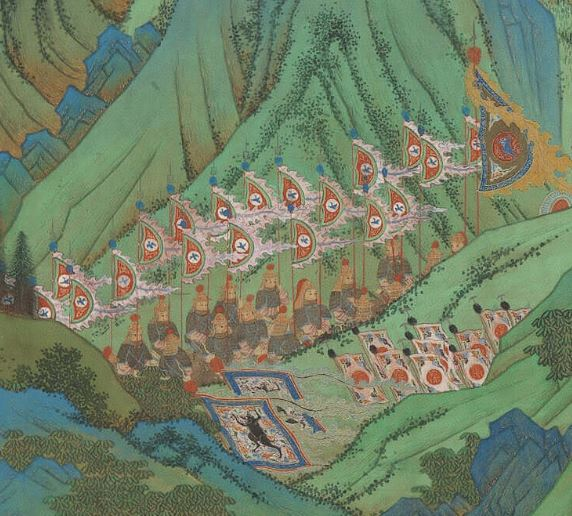

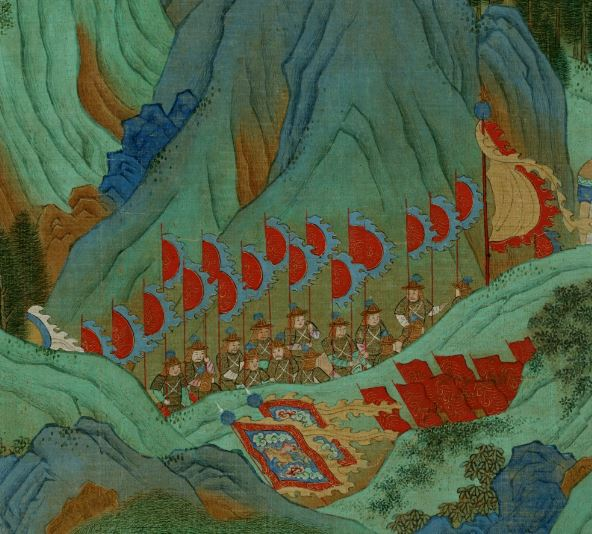

== Notable military figures ==
- Hongwu Emperor
- Mu Ying
- Yongle Emperor
- Qi Jiguang
- Yuan Chonghuan
- Jiao Yu
